= Operation Moonshot =

2020 plan for mass COVID-19 testing in England

Operation Moonshot was a UK government programme to introduce same-day mass testing for COVID-19 in England as a way of enabling large gatherings of people to take place in that country while maintaining control over the virus. According to the British Medical Journal, the programme aimed to deliver 10 million tests per day by 2021.

The programme led to concerns over its expected cost of £100bn, according to a leaked government document, which would be about three-quarters of the total annual cost of NHS England. Statisticians warned that given the inaccuracies inherent in any test, mass testing at this scale was liable to cause hundreds of thousands of false positives a day, resulting in large numbers of people being told that they are infected when they are not.

On 22 October 2020, it was reported that the project had been "subsumed" into the NHS Test and Trace programme run by Dido Harding. As of April 2021, the UK continued to place particular emphasis on mass screening using lateral flow tests, available as at-home kits.

== Description ==
The test being proposed for the programme relied on the development of new technology for saliva samples or swab samples to give a positive or negative reading within minutes, rather than requiring analysis at a laboratory, a process that can take several days. In this way, it was described by media, including the Sheffield Telegraph, as being similar to a pregnancy test. In making a test of this type available, it was projected to negate the need for people to travel to a test centre, something that could require a lengthy journey.

== Structure ==
The operation sat within the UK's Department of Health and Social Care (DHSC) response to COVID-19. Initially, it was a separate government programme, but eventually was subsumed within the national NHS Test and Trace programme. Within the operation, a number of semi-independent teams were established at pace to develop and evaluate COVID-19 technologies that at the time were essentially experimental and unproven.

The remit of each team was to establish and develop a single form of COVID-19 testing. Each team had an academic lead and focussed on development of a single technology: direct LAMP, LAMPore, mass spectrometry, RNA LAMP, point of care PCR, machine-reader lateral flow tests, and non-machine based lateral flow tests.

The triage and evaluation of plans for machine-based technology was led by the UK government's TVG (Technical validation group) and non-machine based technology by the COVID-19 Oversight group with input from Public Health England, National Health Service, academic/scientific advisors and DHSC.

LAMP development was led by Prof Keith Godfrey at the University of Southampton.

Oxford Nanopore developed a technology called LAMPore. They were contracted to deliver millions of tests based on a novel testing method called Transcriptase Loop Amplification (LAMP) that is currently under development; it was hoped that these tests would be able to deliver a result in less than an hour. The government also paid £323 million for 90 million 20-minute saliva testing kits, chemicals and 600 "Genie HT" machines made by OptiGene, a company based in Horsham, Sussex.

== History ==
The project was announced at a Downing Street briefing by Boris Johnson, the Prime Minister, on 9 September 2020. Johnson suggested that mass testing would be a way to allow sports and entertainment venues to reopen again following their closure at the beginning of the pandemic, and for the possibility of people to gather for Christmas parties. Up to that point, scientists had used testing to identify people giving a positive result for the virus, but Johnson outlined what he described as "the 'Moonshot" approach", a test that would show people who are negative and do not pose a potential risk to others, thus giving them a "freedom pass" to attend events and gather with others "in a pre-Covid way".

A pilot scheme was announced for indoor and outdoor events in Salford, Greater Manchester, set to begin in October, with plans for a national rollout after that. However, at the time it was unclear what type of tests might be used for mass testing, although it was clear that it might either involve viral antigen detection using lateral flow or Reverse Transcription Loop-mediated Isothermal Amplification. On 18 August, at the request of ministers in the Department of Health and Social Care, Public Health England, Porton Down and the University of Oxford were requested to develop the clinical research and evaluation infrastructure required to identify the most promising lateral flow devices with the best performance characteristics.

About a week before Johnson's announcement, Matt Hancock, the Secretary of State for Health, had announced that the government would provide funding worth £500m for the development of a saliva test that would produce a result within 20 minutes. Such tests would be used at workplaces and leisure venues to regularly test those entering the facility. The programme had a target of providing 10 million tests per day by 2021, with GP surgeries and pharmacies utilised to make public access to testing much easier. Plans envisaged weekly tests of up to 10% of the population of England, using millions of 30-minute saliva kits made by the company Innova, "to help control localised outbreaks". Local public health directors would be "eligible to receive on a weekly basis the number of tests equivalent to 10% of their population."

Several private sector firms were signed up to the programme, including GSK for the provision of tests, AstraZeneca for laboratory capacity, and Serco and G4S for storage and logistics. One of the government's advisers on rapid testing was Harvard epidemiologist Michael Mina, who suggested a similar "moonshot" in the United States.

By 13 October 2020, the Salford pilot scheme – originally envisaged to involve regular testing of all 254,000 residents – had been significantly scaled back, with government sources saying it would now be "focused on high-risk environments and groups", with testing offered to residents "in some areas of high-density housing". On 19 October, the government announced the start of a pilot of LAMP and lateral flow tests for asymptomatic staff in hospitals in Manchester, Southampton and Basingstoke, with "schools, universities and care homes in the worst-affected regions" to follow at a later date.

On 22 October 2020, it was reported that Operation Moonshot had been "subsumed" into the NHS Test and Trace (NHSTT) programme run by Dido Harding. A legal letter by government lawyers responding to a bid by the Good Law Project to scrutinise the amounts of government money paid to private contractors said: "The proposal referred to in the Project Moonshot Briefing Pack was developed alongside the existing NHS Test and Trace programme of the Department of Health and Social Care (DHSC). NHSTT's approved 'core' budget was approximately £12.1bn. The substance of the proposal referred to in the Project Moonshot Briefing Pack has since been subsumed within NHSTT, reflecting the fast-moving and constantly evolving policy requirements in the field of testing. It has come to be referred to as part of NHSTT's 'mass testing' programme."

On 5 November 2020' The Guardian reported that rapid "Direct RT-Lamp" saliva tests made by OptiGene and used in the pilot trial in Salford and Manchester had identified only 46.7% of infections, meaning that in a real-world setting more than half of those infected would be wrongly told that they were virus-free. A DHSC scientist was quoted as saying, "It is incorrect to claim the tests have a low sensitivity, with a recent pilot showing overall technical sensitivity of nearly 80%, rising to over 96% in individuals with a higher viral load, making it important for detecting individuals in the infectious stage. The challenge now is to understand the reasons for the difference in claimed sensitivity in one evaluation versus those in multiple others.

== Reception ==
The announcement quickly attracted scrutiny from scientists and health experts, who voiced their doubt as to whether testing several million people daily with a quick turnaround was achievable with laboratory capacity as it stood at the time. Sir Patrick Vallance, the Government's Chief Scientific Adviser said it would be "completely wrong to assume this is a slam dunk that can definitely happen", while Dr Jenny Harries, England's deputy chief medical officer, said the programme's success would depend on how it was handled.

Opposition politicians, including Jonathan Ashworth, the Shadow Secretary of State for Health, questioned the programme's feasibility when the system was already struggling to cope with the volume of tests required of it. Responding to concerns, Grant Shapps, the Secretary of State for Transport, said that the technology to implement the system did not yet exist.

=== Concerns about programme privatisation and cost ===
On 10 September 2020, the British Medical Journal quoted a leaked document that forecast the process would cost £100bn—relatively close to the £130bn total annual cost of NHS England. The fact that the plans appeared to involve a substantial proportion of this sum being paid to private businesses attracted comment. Devi Sridhar (University of Edinburgh) said, "There is a case for giving the extra billions to the NHS and asking it to deliver. I have concerns around the bidding process for these contracts. The procurement process isn't clear, and it allows for a lot of people getting rich off this crisis." Anthony Costello, a former director at the World Health Organization, spoke on Twitter of "waste/corruption on a cosmic scale". Martin McKee, professor of European public health at the London School of Hygiene and Tropical Medicine, wondered what parliamentary scrutiny there would be on spending.

Academics from the universities of Glasgow, St. Andrews and Newcastle, writing in the Journal of the Royal Society of Medicine, said that the decision to separate local public health departments and general practices from the private sector testing system had resulted in "delayed outbreak control", adding: "Despite the failings of this largely private, highly centralised NHS Test and Trace system, it has been reported that the government intends to scale up testing to deliver weekly tests for the whole population. Deloitte and a slew of commercial companies are being contracted to deliver them under Operation Moonshot, a plan to ramp up tests to 10 million a day, at a cost of £100 billion – 70 per cent of the annual NHS budget for England. ... We call on the Westminster government to end privatisation of testing and to reinstate and invest in NHS primary care, public health, and NHS laboratory services, and redirect the resources from the current private testing programmes back into the local primary care, local NHS labs and local public health sector." The Good Law Project initiated legal action against the government, arguing the programme was unlawful because it "involves potentially huge private contracts that may not have been tendered and breaks the government's own value-for-money rules.

The government's Scientific Advisory Group for Emergencies (SAGE) said, in a Consensus Statement dated 31 August 2020, it was important "to ensure that any mass testing programme provides additional benefit over investing equivalent resources into (i) improving the speed and coverage of NHS Test and Trace for symptomatic cases [...] and (ii) the rate of self-isolation and quarantine for those that test positive (currently estimated to be <20% fully adherent)"; it added that "mass testing can only lead to decreased transmission if individuals with a positive test rapidly undertake effective isolation." Martin McKee said the programme "focuses on only one part of the problem, testing, and says nothing about what will happen to those found positive, a particular concern given the low proportion of those who do adhere to advice to isolate—in part because of the lack of support they are offered." The government said in response to queries that £500 million had been committed so far, and that final costs were as yet unknown.

=== Danger of false positives in mass testing ===
Another issue raised by statisticians such as David Spiegelhalter (University of Cambridge) is that mass testing is known to generate false positives. Professor Jon Deeks (University of Birmingham, Cochrane) stated that even if a test were to achieve a very good specificity of 99%, meaning that only 1% of healthy people would be wrongly identified as infected, testing the entire population of the UK would result in over half a million people being told they had to self-isolate, along with their contacts. False positives might end up outnumbering actual infected people at a ratio of 1,000 to 1, according to Deeks' estimates. A paper published by SAGE suggested the programme could lead to 41% of the UK population having to self-isolate needlessly within six months due to false positives, and warned of potential school closures and workers' losing their wages through incorrect test results. On 11 September 2020, these concerns were echoed by the Royal Statistical Society, which warned in a letter to The Times that the plan "does not seem to take account of fundamental statistical issues" and risked "causing personal and economic harm to tens of thousands of people."

=== Danger of false negatives in home testing ===
Angela Raffle and Mike Gill, writing in the British Medical Journal in April 2021, called the UK's mass screening approach "a misguided policy, unlikely to reduce transmission", arguing that people might be "tempted" to use home kits rather than go for the more sensitive PCR test, leaving them "falsely reassured".

=== Expertise ===
Academics seeing the leaked documents expressed concern about the apparent lack of input "from scientists, clinicians, and public health and testing and screening experts." On 11 September 2020, The Guardian reported that the National Screening Committee, which normally advises government and the NHS on "all aspects of population screening", had not been consulted on the plans. Allyson Pollock (Newcastle University) stated she found this incomprehensible as many UK experts were available. Jon Deeks added, "There is massive cause for concern that there is no screening expertise evident in the documents. They are written by management consultants."
