= Alan McNally =

British microbiologist

Alan McNally is a professor of microbial genomics at the University of Birmingham, UK. He works on the evolutionary genomics and antimicrobial resistance in bacterial pathogens.

== Education ==
Following undergraduate training at the University of Glasgow (1994-1999), McNally was awarded a PhD in Molecular Microbiology from the Royal (Dick) School of Veterinary Studies, University of Edinburgh, in 2003.

== Research ==
His laboratory is known for work on:

- Yersinia species as a model organism for studying bacterial evolution,
- how bacterial genetic variability can be used to track changes in bacterial populations,
- how lineages of COVID-19 can vary in their viral load,

He has active collaborations in the UK, China, Germany, France, Vietnam, and the US.

== COVID-19 pandemic work ==
During the COVID-19 pandemic in the United Kingdom, McNally was seconded to the Milton Keynes Lighthouse Labs as Infectious Disease lead at the Government's first flagship COVID-19 testing facility. Launched on 9 April 2020, the Milton Keynes Lighthouse Lab was the first of three UK 'mega-labs' that vastly increased the testing capacity, allowing many more patient samples to be processed each day.
