= UK Health Security Agency =

Executive agency in UK health system

Agency overview
- Formed: 1 April 2021
- Preceding agency: Public Health England
- Jurisdiction: England (mostly) and the United Kingdom (for reserved matters only)
- Employees: 5,753 (2023/24)
- Minister responsible: Dame Diana Johnson, Minister of State for Public Health and Patient Safety
- Agency executives: Professor Susan Hopkins, Chief Executive Officer; Ian Peters, Chair
- Parent department: Department of Health and Social Care
- Child agencies: NHS Test and Trace (formerly); Joint Biosecurity Centre
- Website: www.gov.uk/government/organisations/uk-health-security-agency

- Applies to: England (mostly); United Kingdom (for some reserved matters)
- Relates to: Health security and public health

Other UK counterparts
- Northern Ireland: Public Health Agency
- Scotland: Public Health Scotland
- Wales: Public Health Wales

The UK Health Security Agency (UKHSA) is a government agency responsible for all health security in England, and some reserved public health protection matters across the whole of the United Kingdom. It is an executive agency of the Department of Health and Social Care.

The UKHSA was established in April 2021, consolidating Public Health England's infectious disease control responsibilities (along with NHS Test and Trace and the Joint Biosecurity Centre) into a single body focused on health security and pandemic preparedness.

== History ==
=== Formation ===
A new organisation, initially to be called the Centre for Health Protection, was proposed by Matt Hancock, the Secretary of State for Health and Social Care, in July 2020 to combine NHS Test and Trace, the Joint Biosecurity Centre and the health protection functions of Public Health England. Under the name of the National Institute for Health Protection, the organisation was established by Hancock on 18 August 2020 as a single leadership structure bringing together NHS Test and Trace, the Joint Biosecurity Centre and all of Public Health England. Due to the ongoing COVID-19 pandemic, the new organisation was not formally established until 1 April 2021, by which time it was called the UK Health Security Agency. It reports directly to the Secretary of State for Health and Social Care.

Baroness Harding was the interim executive chair of the new organisation from 18 August 2020 to 7 May 2021. In 2022, the High Court found that her appointment to the position broke equalities legislation. She had been the chair of NHS Improvement since 2017, and at the time was head of the NHS Test and Trace programme, established in May 2020. During questioning by the Science and Technology Committee of the House of Commons, Harding said she held the interim leadership while a full application process was carried out.

In August 2020, Health Secretary Matt Hancock said that the NIHP would learn from South Korea and from Germany's Robert Koch Institute "where their health protection agencies have a huge, primary, focus on pandemic response". Over time, UKHSA has built a relationship with Korea Disease Control and Prevention Agency, signing a memorandum of understanding and promoting visits between the two organisations.

The Telegraph first reported news of the plans for the new agency on 16 August 2020, writing that Public Health England was to be "scrapped" and replaced by a single body combining it with NHS Test and Trace, in response to the COVID-19 pandemic. A leaked memo to staff written by the head of Public Health England, Duncan Selbie, said that the aim of the new body was to boost expertise with "much needed new investment". Selbie apologised to staff that the news of the organisation's demise was briefed to The Telegraph before they were told.

In February 2021, Harding said that the new body would not be "fully staffed and up and running" until October 2021. The Institute for Government said that the UKHSA faced financial uncertainty and big cuts in its first year, frustrating recruitment, even at board level. Staff turnover and a requirement to use a new accounting system contributed to a qualified audit opinion from the National Audit Office. It drew the conclusion that, when a public body is set up, the right premises, staff, budgets and systems are needed at the outset, when swift and successful delivery can be essential to earning public trust – even if resources will need to be scaled back later.

On 24 March 2021, Hancock announced that the organisation would be formally established on 1 April 2021 under the new name of the UK Health Security Agency, with Jenny Harries stepping down as England's Deputy Chief Medical Officer to become chief executive, and Ian Peters to be chair. Hancock also confirmed that Harries would take over from Harding as lead of England's test, trace and isolate programme. Harries assumed these roles following a hand-over period which lasted until Harding departed on 7 May 2021.

=== Leadership changes ===
In January 2025, the Department of Health and Social Care announced that Harries would be stepping down as chief executive; at the same time Isabel Oliver, chief scientific officer, transferred to the role of Chief Medical Officer for Wales. The announcement followed wide-scale changes in the leadership of the department (including the permanent secretary and non-executive directors), NHS England, and the Care Quality Commission under the Starmer administration.

== Role ==
The responsibilities of the UKHSA include:

- All health protection functions within England
- Some health protection functions within the devolved nations which have been reserved at the UK level (mostly those requiring specialist capability, such as on radiation hazards)
- Providing advice and expertise to the Secretary of State in the execution of their statutory duty to protect the nation's health
- Planning and executing the response to external health threats, such as pandemics
- Driving innovation within health protection and life sciences

UKHSA collaborates with Public Health Scotland, Public Health Wales and Northern Ireland's Public Health Agency. It also works with local authorities, NHS organisations, academic institutions, and industry to ensure effective policy response and implementation.

== Controversies ==
=== Response to its formation ===
A 2020 BMJ editorial described the creation of the agency as "extremely foolhardy". It characterised the National Institute for Health Protection as "seem[ing] remarkably similar to the Health Protection Agency abolished in 2013." An August 2020 editorial in The Spectator welcomed the return to an organisation similar in remit to that agency; it criticised Public Health England's focus on health improvement topics such as obesity and binge drinking, arguing that these should be tackled by local NHS health teams. In August 2020 The Telegraph welcomed the change, characterising PHE as the quango "responsible for many critical failures over the course of this [COVID-19] pandemic" that had to be scrapped.

On 2 September 2020, more than 70 health organisations wrote to the government to express concern about the future of health improvement work under these changes.

The appointment of Lady Harding as interim executive chair of the new body was criticised by health experts as she did not have a background in health, and because of her political position. The Guardian quoted allies of hers who, in response, said that she had quickly learned after being appointed chair of NHS Improvement in 2017 and that she had a record of "getting things done" while working in business.

The timing of the reorganisation, during the ongoing pandemic response, was criticised by various health experts and other bodies, including the editorial in the BMJ, the Institute for Government, The King's Fund, and Christina Marriott, the chief executive of the Royal Society for Public Health. An editorial in The Guardian compared it to "reorganising a fire brigade as it tries to put out a blaze" and said the decision had been made without proper consultation or scrutiny.

=== Vaccine data ===
In November 2025, the UKHSA was criticised by anti-vaccination campaigners for withholding data on deaths following vaccination against COVID-19. UsForThem, an anti-vaccine campaign group, requested under freedom of information laws that the UKHSA publish data on vaccines received by adults who died between 2021 and 2023, in addition to anonymised data on the vaccination campaign that the agency had published in 2024. The agency refused this request, citing patient confidentiality. UsForThem then appealed to the First-tier Tribunal, which upheld the agency's position.

== See also ==
- Office for Health Improvement and Disparities
- Public Health England
- Public Health Scotland
- Public Health Wales
- Public Health Agency (Northern Ireland)
