= NHS Test and Trace =

Government COVID-19 agency in England

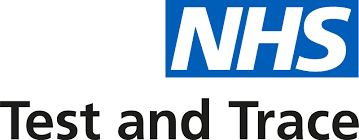

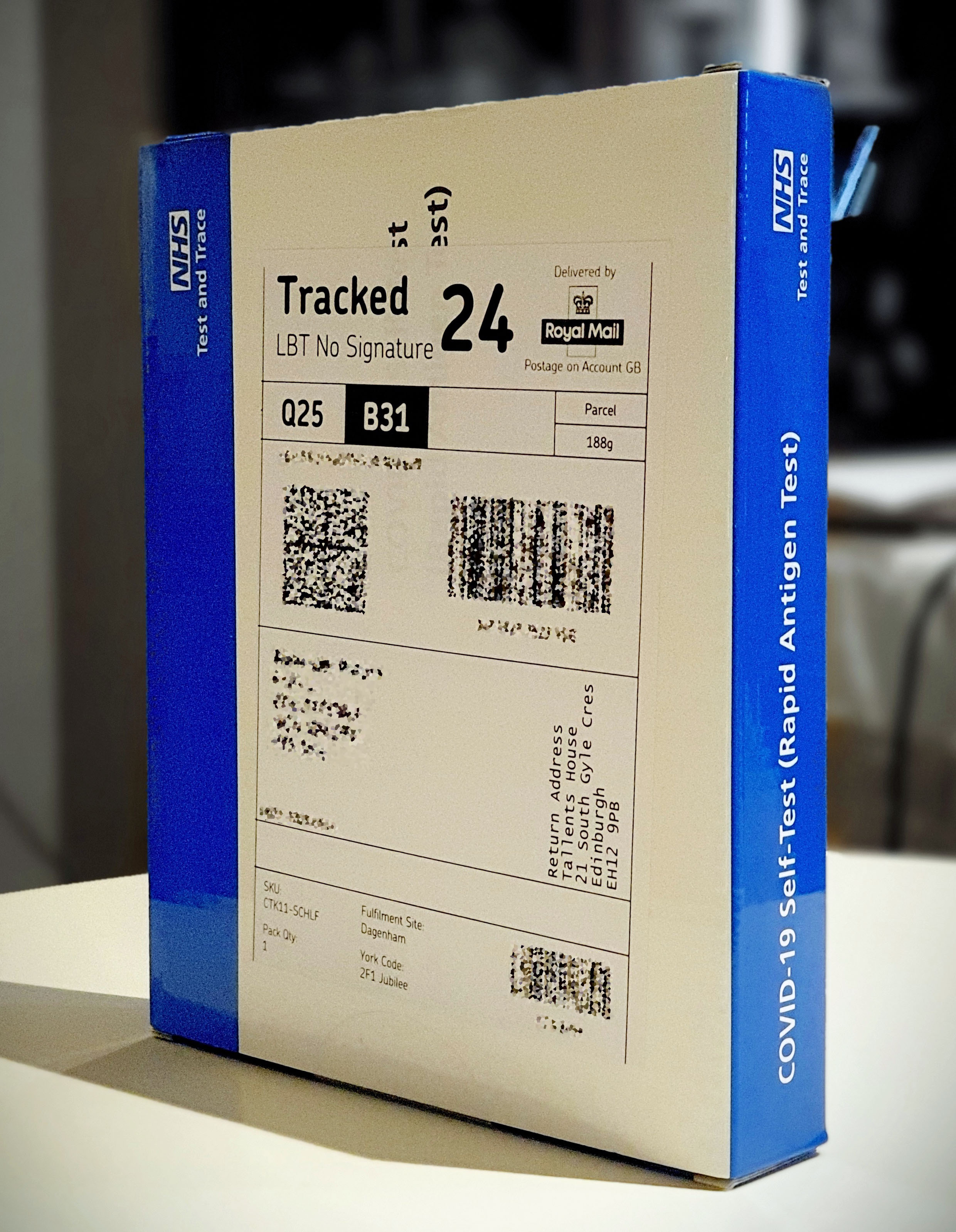
- A box containing a COVID-19 lateral flow test

Agency overview
- Formed: 28 May 2020
- Dissolved: 22 February 2022
- Jurisdiction: England
- Agency executive: Jenny Harries, Chief Executive of UK Health Security Agency
- Parent department: Department of Health and Social Care

NHS Test and Trace was a government-funded service in England, established in 2020 to track and help prevent the spread of COVID-19. The programme was part of the UK Health Security Agency; the service and the agency were headed by Jenny Harries.

The service was the responsibility of the Secretary of State for Health and Social Care and the Minister of State for Social Care. It was then devolved to the Parliamentary Under-Secretary of State for Innovation at that ministry. The initial budget for the service was £15 billion, rising to £22bn in November 2020, and a further £15bn was allocated for 2021–2022 to bring the total for the two years to £37bn. Routine contact tracing was halted on 24 February 2022 when the service was closed.

The service provided temporary sites where samples were taken from individuals, the samples were then processed at a newly created network of laboratories, and the results were communicated; infected people were instructed to isolate themselves from others and asked to provide details of their recent close contacts, who are also told to isolate. Almost all of the work was outsourced to consultants and contractors, although some of the laboratories involved other government bodies and universities. NHS Test and Trace was separate from the pre-existing infection control function of Public Health England, which worked with NHS laboratories.

== Creation ==
During the early stages of the COVID-19 pandemic, contact tracing was carried out by Public Health England, working with local authorities; PHE was an agency of the Department of Health and Social Care and not part of the NHS. Tracing efforts largely ceased on 12 March 2020 in view of the wide spread of infection in the population. Around the same time, testing NHS patients and staff was made a priority, and took all available test capacity.

The new agency was announced by Matt Hancock, the then Secretary of State for Health and Social Care, in April 2020 and began operations towards the end of May. It was led by Baroness Dido Harding, a Conservative peer and businesswoman, until the establishment of the UK Health Security Agency in April 2021.

== Overview ==
NHS Test and Trace's remit was to find people who had come into close contact with those infected by the virus, thus enabling the lifting of blanket lockdown restrictions and a potential shift towards more localised measures were they be required. The organisation employed a team of (initially) 25,000 contact tracers who contacted people who have newly tested positive for COVID-19 and asked them about their recent movements, before identifying others they may have come into contact with. Those people were then required to go into self-isolation for ten days (fourteen days until December 2020; some workers exempted from July 2021; double-vaccinated exempted from August 2021; isolation reduced to seven days in some cases in December 2021 and then five days in January 2022).

The contact tracers were employed by Serco, who engaged subcontractors – 29 of them in September 2020. Serco were paid £108 million for the first phase of the work, up to late August 2020. The call centre was operated by American specialists Sitel, who were paid £84M for the first phase. In November 2020, Dido Harding described it as "the largest outbound calling centre in the UK". Software from Salesforce was supplied by IBM under a Strategic Sales Solution contract worth around £25M for 2020–21.

In late September and early October 2020, an Excel row-limit error in England's case-handling pipeline meant 15,841 positive cases were not promptly referred to contact tracing. This deficiency in the programme created a large-scale natural experiment which was later used by researchers to show that timely tracing substantially reduced subsequent infections and deaths.

All components – administering tests, processing samples in laboratories, and contact tracing – were contracted to private companies. Multinational consultants Deloitte handle testing logistics, including collection of statistics, and in turn appointed outsourcing companies Serco, Mitie, G4S and Sodexo, together with the Boots pharmacy chain, to run drive-through or walk-in test centres. In October 2020, over 1,100 Deloitte consultants were reported to be engaged. In March 2021, the Public Accounts Committee criticised "persistent reliance on consultants", stating that 2,500 were being used at an average cost of £1,100 per day each.

Mobile testing units (MTUs) were designed, prototyped, bought and operated by the Army in April. By 20 July there were 218 in operation in England, Wales and Scotland, and the units were then handed over to undisclosed civilian contractors. Mobile units in Northern Ireland were operated by civilians from the outset.

The system worked in parallel with Public Health England's local health protection teams, who in turn work with local authority staff. Cases involving institutions such as hospitals, care homes and prisons were handed off to the local teams, who gave advice to the institution rather than the affected individuals. Less complex cases were handled by NHS Test and Trace: the infected person was contacted by text, email or phone, and asked to give details of their recent close contacts. They would be able to either enter these contact details into the Test and Trace website, or give them over the phone to a contact tracer. If they did not respond, in some areas NHS Test and Trace passed their details to a team employed by the local authority, who would make further attempts to contact them by phone or text and, in some cases, by home visit.

As of December 2020, there were in excess of 700 testing sites in operation with the stated average distance of travel to reach one at 2.4 miles. All sites operated 7 days a week, including over Christmas and New Year albeit with reduced hours.

=== Geographic scope ===
The scope of the NHS Test and Trace contact-tracing service was England only, the other United Kingdom administrations making their own arrangements. However, the laboratory network operated UK-wide.

=== Budget ===
The initial budget for 2020–21 was £15bn, of which around 85% (£12.8bn) was for testing. In November 2020, a further £7bn was allocated as part of the UK government's COVID-19 Winter Plan. £15bn was allocated for the 2021–22 financial year, bringing the total for the two years to £37bn. In February 2022, it was confirmed that the test and trace programme had cost £15.7bn in 2021/22.

After the first phases, Serco were awarded a 12-month contract worth up to £322M in June 2021. A month after the ending of routine contact tracing in February 2022, the company won a two-year contract for disease testing and contact tracing worth a maximum of £212M.

=== Test processing and 'lighthouse labs' ===
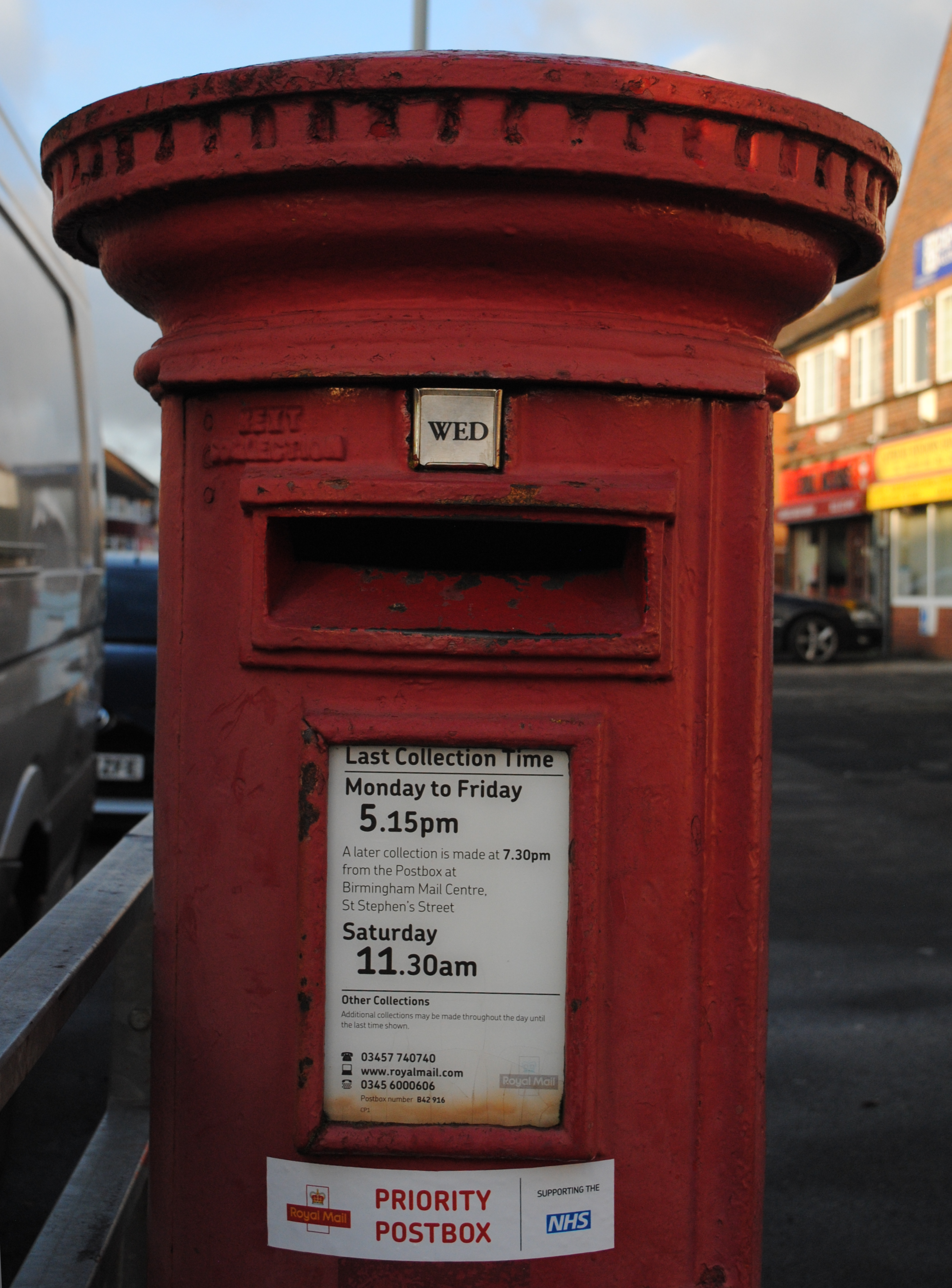
"Priority Postbox", designated for returning home testing kits, Great Barr, Birmingham, England

Test kits for use at home (and at some test centres) were provided and processed by Randox under a £133M contract, with logistics by Amazon and Royal Mail, and some identity checking by American consumer credit agency TransUnion. Randox had a lab in Northern Ireland, although in May 2020 some samples were processed in the United States owing to lack of capacity. Special arrangements were made with Royal Mail for the return of home testing kits via designated "Priority Postboxes", which were identified by the attachment of special stickers.

Before the COVID-19 pandemic, tests for infections in England were carried out at laboratories within either Public Health England or the NHS (the latter often sited at hospitals, and reporting results to PHE's surveillance system). In early April 2020, the government reserved the capacity of these labs for testing NHS patients and staff, calling this "pillar one" of their testing strategy.

"Pillar two" provided mass testing – at first to key workers, later to the general public – using a new network of large processing centres operated by commercial companies and universities, coordinated by Deloitte. Initially three of these sites were planned, at Milton Keynes, Alderley Park and in Glasgow. They were collectively named "lighthouse labs" since they employed the PCR test which uses fluorescent dye to detect the virus. At Milton Keynes, around 240 academics, researchers and students volunteered their services in March and April 2020, in some cases processing tests manually until automation was ready towards the end of April. Geneticist Paul Nurse, director of the Francis Crick Institute, repurposed academic laboratories to perform tests and later criticised the government's reliance on the private sector.

As of November 2020, six sites were in operation:

- Alderley Park, Cheshire – led by Medicines Discovery Catapult
- Cambridge – AstraZeneca, GlaxoSmithKline and Cambridge University
- Glasgow – Glasgow University, supported by the Scottish Government
- Milton Keynes – UK Biocentre, part of the National Institute for Health Research and with Alan McNally as the infectious diseases lead
- Newport – PerkinElmer, supported by the Welsh Government
- Loughborough – PerkinElmer

In November, two further 'mega labs' were announced as due to open in early 2021 at Leamington Spa and an unconfirmed site in Scotland. The Public Accounts Committee found that overall usage of laboratory testing capacity was below 65% in November and December 2020. The Scottish lab was subject to delays and in January its construction was halted, as the UK government was reported to be assessing the long-term demand for the laboratory. Meanwhile, smaller laboratories were opened in Glasgow and Aberdeen during December 2020, but another smaller one planned for Edinburgh had not yet been opened.

Three new laboratories managed by NHS trusts, at Gateshead, Bracknell (Brants Bridge) and Plymouth, joined the system in March 2021. The Leamington Spa lab, described as the UK's first testing mega-lab, began operation in June 2021 and was later named as the Rosalind Franklin Laboratory, in honour of the pioneering scientist in molecular biology.

From 1 April 2022, access to free tests was withdrawn except for high-risk settings (such as hospitals) and some workers in high-risk roles. Consequently, most of the lighthouse labs were closed. In January 2023, the Rosalind Franklin Laboratory ceased to process PCR tests, leaving two sites operational alongside the NHS laboratories.

=== Phone app ===
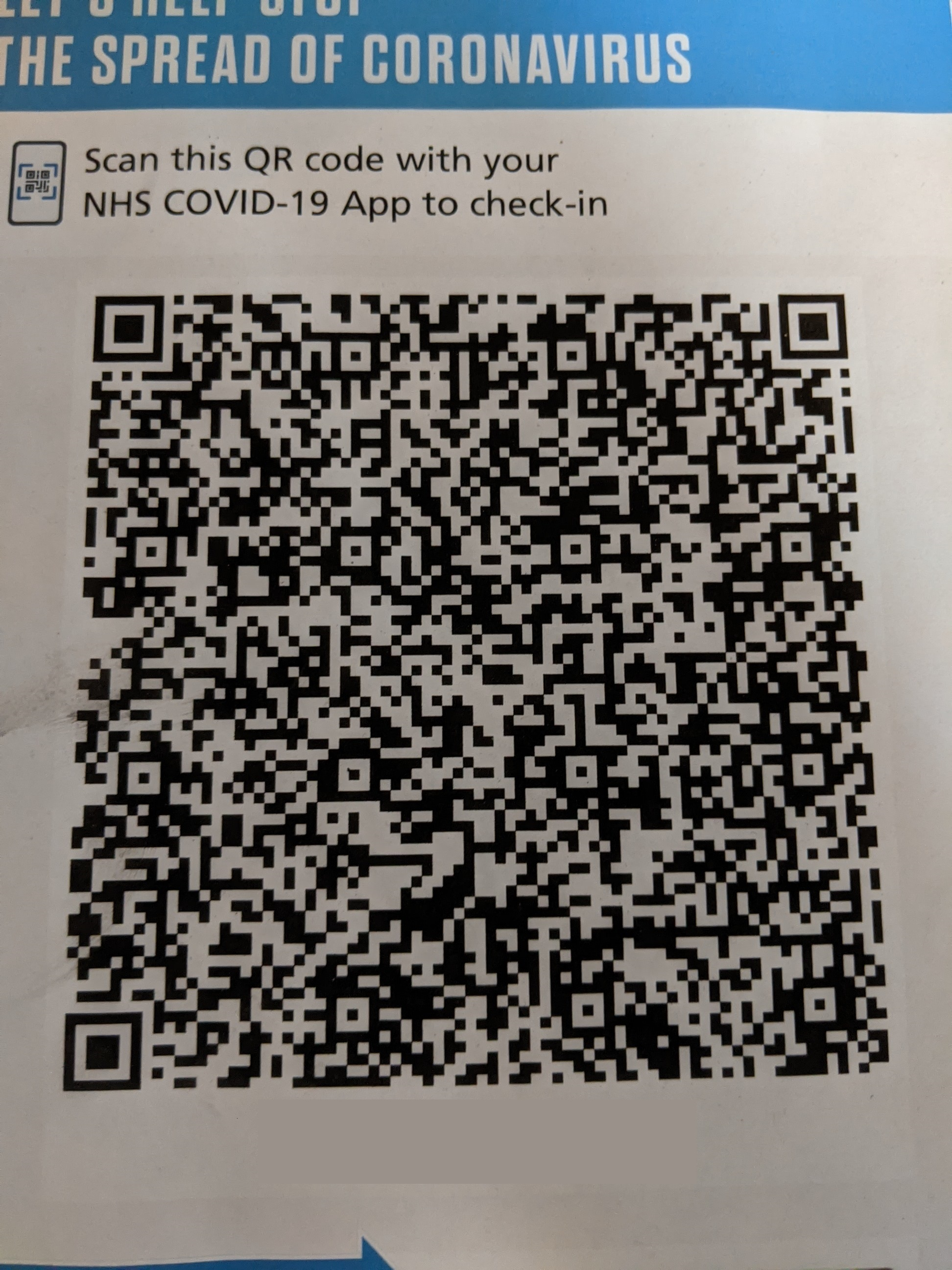
A venue poster showing a QR code to use with the NHS COVID-19 app

The system was designed to work in conjunction with the NHS COVID-19 app, which was originally announced for mid-May but subsequently delayed due to technical issues during its testing phase. The app enabled those who had been in close contact with a person with COVID-19 to be identified using their mobile phone. Prior to this, information would be gathered by questioning people about their recent movements.

Following a further delay, Liberal Democrat MP Daisy Cooper tweeted on 28 May: "Dido Harding just told me that the #NHSX app described by PM a week ago as 'world-beating' is in fact just a 'cherry on top' of the tracing system: which itself won't be fully operational until end June... 4 weeks after lockdown restrictions ease. This is a high risk strategy." Replying to a question at the government's daily briefing on 11 June, Hancock was unable to give any date for rollout of the app, saying it would be brought in "when it's right to do so". On 18 June, development of the app was abandoned in favour of a different design using the Apple/Google Exposure Notification system.

Public trials of the second version of the app began on 13 August 2020, and it was made available to the public on 24 September.

Users of the app could scan a QR code at participating venues. Between 24 September 2020 and 18 July 2021 it was mandatory for hospitality, tourism and leisure venues, hairdressers and similar services, and local authority amenities to display a code.

=== Record-keeping by venues ===
From early July 2020, establishments where people came into prolonged contact with those from other households were asked to collect the names and phone numbers of staff, customers, and visitors, and to keep those records for 21 days. No check for accuracy was required, and at first there was no requirement to refuse admission to anyone declining to provide these details. Public health officers could request those records if the premises were suspected to be the site of a COVID-19 outbreak. Applicable establishments included all hospitality outlets except takeaway food and drink, tourism and leisure, community facilities, places of worship, and close contact services such as hairdressers.

From 18 September, hospitality venues were required to refuse entry to a customer or visitor when they (or the leader of their group) had neither provided contact details nor scanned the official QR code using the NHS COVID-19 app. On 14 October, the requirement to keep records was extended to cinemas, concert venues and theatres.

In March 2021, it was reported that little use had been made of the data collected from app check-ins or held by venues. On the 29th of that month it became a requirement for every customer or visitor to provide their names and contact details; until then, when a group entered a venue it was sufficient for the group's leader to provide just their own name and details.

All legislation regarding data collection was revoked with effect from 19 July 2021. However, government guidance continued to encourage check-ins by customers, visitors and staff, and the keeping of records.

=== At-home self-testing ===
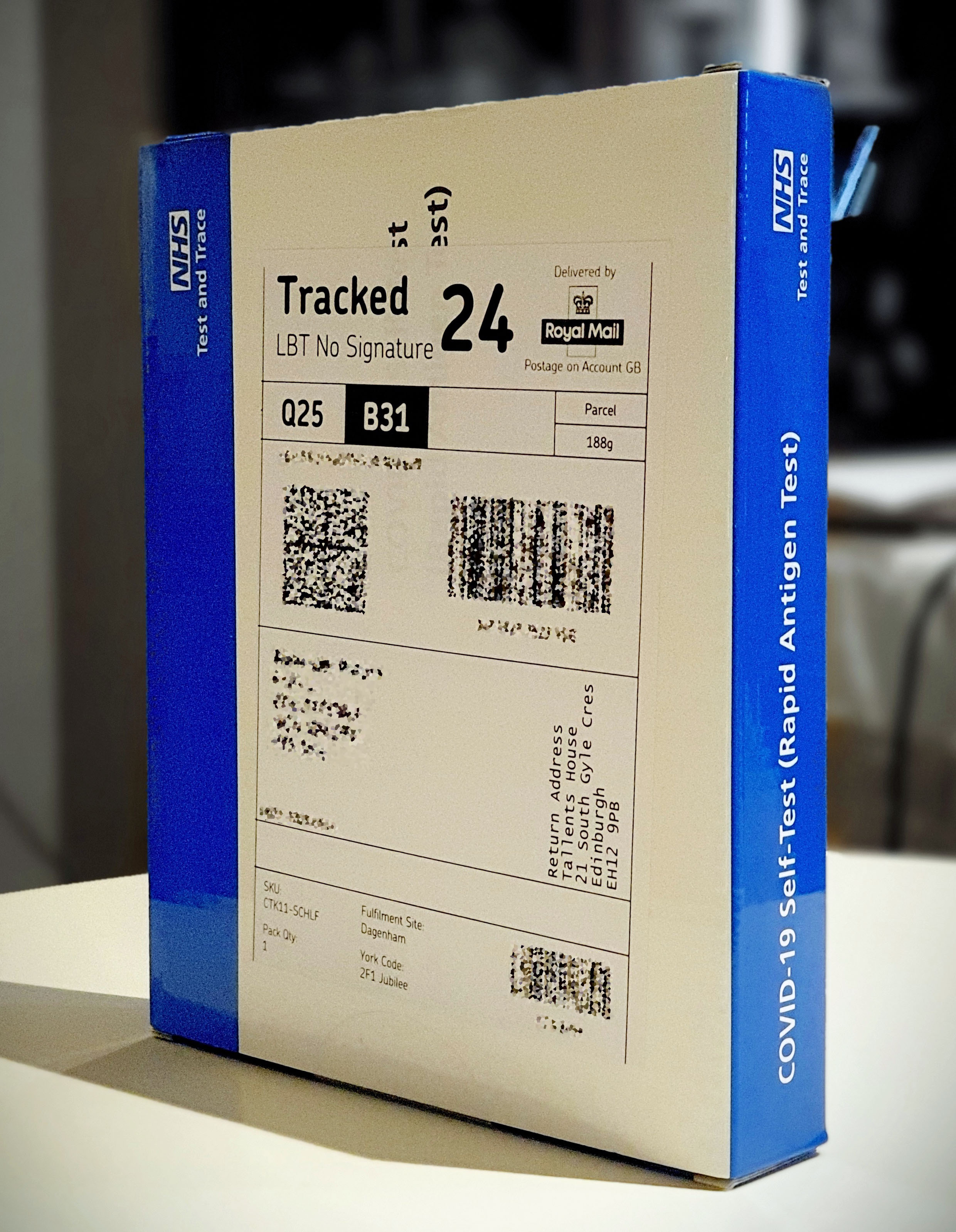
A COVID-19 lateral flow test provided by NHS Test and Trace in April 2021

From 9 April 2021, NHS Test and Trace made COVID-19 rapid antigen lateral flow tests available for home use by everyone in England, regardless of symptoms or occupation, in preparation for greater relaxation of social distancing rules. It became possible for each person to order, free of charge, a box of seven tests through Gov.uk. These were delivered by an overnight tracked service, with delivery possible through a standard home letterbox. The Department of Health and Social Care encouraged people in England to self-test twice a week in order to detect asymptomatic cases, which were reportedly as many as 1 in 3 infections.

Results from the lateral flow test were designed to return in 30 minutes, and the accuracy of the test was reported to be one false positive in every 1,000 tests. False negatives were found to be more common however, with a study of a November 2020 pilot deployment in Liverpool finding 23.2% of positive cases were not detected when tests were conducted by medical professionals, rising to 42.5% of positive cases when the tests were self-administered. Anyone receiving a positive result was expected to self-isolate for the standard time mandated by government guidance.

== History ==
The programme was outlined by Matt Hancock, the Secretary of State for Health and Social Care, at the UK government's daily briefing on 23 April, when he stated that 18,000 contract tracers would be hired; at that time the name given to the programme was 'test, track and trace'. At the 4 May briefing, Hancock said he hoped to have the system in place by the middle of the month, and that 3,000 of the recruits would be medical staff. It was reported that Serco and Sitel had been contracted to supply 15,000 call centre workers, who would have a short training period, and Hancock was criticised for not making use of around 5,000 environmental health workers in local authorities. In April 2020, Ceredigion council had developed their own contact tracing system using local trained staff and volunteers, with better results.

On 7 May, Hancock appointed Baroness Harding to lead the contact tracing programme for England, with a remit to oversee the implementation of the programme and a contact tracing app. By this time the mode of working had been established and contracts had been signed with suppliers. On 18 May, Hancock said 21,000 tracers had been hired. On 20 May, Prime Minister Boris Johnson told Prime Minister's Questions that a team of 25,000 contact tracers would be ready to begin work on 1 June. The launch of the contact tracing service for England began on 22 May, when the government announced eleven pilot areas, including Norfolk, where the service would be initially rolled out. A £300M investment package was also announced to help local authorities support the service.

=== Deployment ===
The launch of the system in England – branded for the first time as NHS Test and Trace – was announced by Boris Johnson, the Prime Minister on 27 May 2020, and it went live the next day, before it was fully ready. Initially officials believed it would have the capacity to identify 10,000 people a day. News that the service would be established without the phone app led to concerns manual tracing alone would not be effective enough to slow the spread of the virus.

On the day of its launch, contact tracers began the process by contacting the 2,013 people who had tested positive for COVID-19 the previous day. Some tracers initially reported difficulties in accessing the system, but the UK government said it had not crashed and the problems were being resolved.

On 28 May, Harding told MPs that the system would not be "fully operational at a local level" until the end of June. Contractor Serco stated in internal communications that they believed it would not be fully operational until September.

By 1 June, Hancock described the system as "up and running" but was unable to say how many cases had been handled. On 3 June Channel 4 News reported that 4,456 confirmed cases of COVID-19 were reported to Test and Trace between 28 and 31 May, with those people passing on 4,634 contacts, and of those it said 1,749 had been contacted by tracers. The government described the data as outdated. On the same day a contact tracer said in a BBC interview that although she had worked for 38 hours she had not been asked to speak to anyone since beginning work, and had spent her time watching Netflix. In response the government said her story did not reflect the work taking place.

In early July, NHS Test and Trace began to publish statistics for the numbers of tests performed and the time taken to return results. Before this, unreliable data had been published so as to ensure that the numbers of tests rose for each daily press conference. Decisions were made in order to achieve target numbers, rather than effective disease control systems. Various government departments, agencies and consultants struggled to navigate a maze of different computer systems.

=== Evolution ===
A reorganisation of the contact tracing element was announced on 10 August, following criticism that the service was not making use of local knowledge. The number of tracers in national teams would soon be reduced from 18,000 to 12,000, and some staff would work in teams linked to local authorities, at first in areas with high prevalence; the number of clinically trained advisors would not change. Harding said "We have always been clear that NHS Test and Trace must be local by default ... we work with and through partners across the country".

Andy Burnham, Mayor of Greater Manchester, said on 2 September that resources from the national test and trace system had not yet been released to local authorities. Earlier, authorities including Blackburn and Oldham set up local systems involving GPs and Public Health England, as it was taking up to 96 hours for cases to be transferred from the national system.

On 11 October, it was reported that local contact tracing had been trialled for several weeks in over 60 council areas, with local personnel picking up on "difficult cases". A government press release on 5 November stated that local tracing partnerships were in place for 148 local authorities, with a further 150 planned. Later that month, the BBC reported criticism from councils concerning delays, missing contact details and lack of access to the central IT system. A government press release on 28 January 2021 gave the number of local partnerships as 300.

By 21 August there were around 370 testing sites, of which 38 were "walk-in" and 236 were mobile test units. On 10 September the total was 400, with a target of 500 by the end of October; this target was exceeded, with 600 in operation at 2 November. In December the fleet of mobile test units was replaced by vehicles with twice the test capacity, and their number was doubled from 250 to 500. At 28 January 2021 there were 800 test sites, and turnaround times had improved, with 94% of in-person test results returned the next day.

By mid-September, more than 11% of people living in England had been tested at least once. In early December, this had risen to 20%.

A business plan published in December 2020 set a goal of reaching 90% of cases, and 85% of the contacts they name, by the end of January 2021. Overall speed would be increased by March 2021, with a goal of 72 hours for the interval starting when a person books a test (which turns out to be positive) and ending when around 80% of their contacts have been notified. Partnership with local authorities would be strengthened, aided by up to £200M per month made available to them through the Contain Outbreak Management Fund.

In March 2021, staffing was reduced by around 8,000 after cases declined from their January peak. By July 2021, all areas of England were covered by local contact tracing partnerships, where staff from local authorities take over cases where the national team has been unable to make contact within 24 hours. In the same month, it was reported that Serco and Sitel had been asked to recruit 7,000 call-centre staff in response to rapidly increasing infections.

=== Self-isolation support payments ===
From 28 September 2020 until 23 February 2022, employed people who were asked to isolate were eligible for a £500 payment if they were unable to work at home and were receiving certain state benefits or had a low income.

=== Managed Quarantine Service ===
From 15 February 2021, travellers entering the UK from outside the Common Travel Area were required to quarantine for 10 days at their destination, or (if arriving from or via certain countries) to pay for 11 nights in a designated hotel. Statistical reports from NHS Test and Trace began to include managed quarantine after the scheme's first five weeks, 15 February to 17 March; by that time 289,000 people had entered the system, 282,000 of them "at home" and 6,400 at a hotel.

=== April 2021 restructure ===
An announcement by Hancock on 18 August established the National Institute for Health Protection by combining NHS Test and Trace with parts of Public Health England. In March 2021, the new organisation was renamed the UK Health Security Agency, and a formal start date of 1 April was indicated. UKHSA became fully operational on 1 October 2021, but with the NHS Test and Trace brand being continued through winter 2021/2.

=== Closure of the service ===
As part of the strategy for England called "Living with Covid", routine contact tracing ended on 24 February 2022 when the service was formally disbanded.

== Key people ==
Jenny Harries (formerly a regional director at Public Health England and Deputy Chief Medical Officer for England) was responsible for NHS Test and Trace from 1 April 2021, in her role as Chief Executive of the UK Health Security Agency. Previously, Dido Harding led Test and Trace since its formation.

Steve McManus was the Director of Contact Tracing from Autumn 2020, on a six-month secondment from his role as Chief Executive of Royal Berkshire NHS Foundation Trust. Earlier directors included Tom Riordan (for three months from mid-May 2020, alongside his role as CEO of Leeds City Council) and Haroona Franklin (brought in from HM Revenue and Customs in July).

Mike Coupe, former CEO of Sainsbury's supermarkets, was appointed as short-term leader of testing from October 2020, replacing Sarah-Jane Marsh, chief executive of Birmingham Women's and Children's NHS Foundation Trust, who was appointed in May. Susan Hopkins, a director in Public Health England's National Infection Service, held the position of Interim Chief Medical Adviser in September 2020. As of the following month, there were no other public health experts in the organisation's senior roles.

== Concerns over testing ==
=== Capacity ===
In late August 2020, the Lighthouse labs were overstretched and sought assistance from NHS labs. A rapid increase in COVID-19 cases in early September led to the demand for tests outstripping supply in some areas which caused delays in accessing the appointment system, and in some cases, people were being asked to travel longer distances to get tests.

The leader of the testing programme, Sarah-Jane Marsh, apologised on 8 September 2020, saying the "pinch-point" was laboratory processing. The following day the senior director of public health in a local authority was quoted as saying "I am not interested in an apology. I want them to pull their finger out and sort this mess out or hand it over to us and get out of the way." Matt Hancock, commenting on the same issue, suggested that the reason people were unable to book tests was that the proportion being booked by people who were not eligible to have them had risen to 25%. He said "[w]e have seen an increase in demand including from people who are not eligible for tests, people who don't have symptoms".

In mid-September, the Independent reported that the Lighthouse labs had been partly staffed by university technicians and students, who had since returned to their universities; there were also logistical difficulties with movement of test samples. A report by The Guardian described testing sites attended by hardly any people, staffed by personnel frustrated at not being permitted to test people from nearby who turn up without an appointment. It was reported that people attending a site without appointment were advised informally to get an appointment anywhere using a false postcode, and download the QR code for it; with such an appointment they can be tested.

Analysis by Sky News on 17 September found three factors causing strain on the system: the decision to reserve 100,000 tests per day (50% of capacity) for care home residents and staff; a surge in demand from schools; and the resurgence of the pandemic earlier than the expected October or November. Questioned on the same day by the Science and Technology Committee of the Commons, Harding stated the test capacity was 242,000 per day, and said that the increase in demand had not been expected. The BBC were told that deliveries of samples to labs were unpredictable, making it hard to have the right number of staff in place each day. A 21 September paper from the Department of Health and Social Care listed the priorities for swab tests, and stated that members of the public without symptoms should not ask for tests.

Daily test capacity exceeded 500,000 by the end of October, aided by a further Lighthouse lab at Newport. In February 2021, daily capacity was 790,000. Over 3 million people were tested in the week ending 3 February, the highest number so far; by that date almost 21.8 million people had been tested at least once since the launch of NHS Test and Trace, equivalent to a third of the population of England.

=== 2021 Immensa scandal ===
On 15 October 2021, UKHSA suspended processing of PCR tests at the Wolverhampton laboratory of Immensa Health Clinic Limited, after the lab was found to have issued incorrect negative test results between 2 September and 12 October. The agency estimated that 43,000 people, mainly in several counties of South West England, could have been given false negative results during that time. It was estimated that around a quarter of positive cases were missed, and experts pointed to a drop in cases in the affected area which was followed by a surge later in October.

Concerns were raised in late September and early October by members of the public, who noticed occurrences of positive lateral flow tests followed by negative PCR results, and UKHSA were aware of discrepancies by 6 October. It transpired that no checks were in place to compare results against other laboratories. UKHSA launched a "serious untoward incident" investigation into the failings of itself and its predecessors, which published a final report in November 2022. The 87-page report made recommendations regarding procurement of laboratory services, their accreditation and monitoring, and processes for managing the response to incidents. Some improvements had already been made to UKHSA processes, including better detection of inconsistent lab results, better record-keeping during incidents, and improvements to contract management.

Immensa Health Clinic Ltd was established in May 2020 and had been awarded contracts worth £170M to process PCR tests. A sister company, Dante Labs, was at that time under investigation by the Competition and Markets Authority over concerns that PCR tests for travellers had been mishandled. Neither company was accredited by the United Kingdom Accreditation Service, contrary to assurances given by officials including Jenny Harries, chief executive of UKHSA.

== Contact tracing statistics ==
The Department of Health & Social Care published weekly statistics on contact tracing. Numbers shown below include the complex cases handled by local health protection teams as well as those handled online and by the call centre; the first week's report stated that a "high number" of contacts were managed by the local teams.

By the end of July the percentage of contacts reached had decreased, which was said to be primarily due to a decrease in the number of complex cases handled by local teams, where the success rate is higher. Of the 3,688 cases handled in the week to 29 July, only 249 (7%) were classed as complex. After their close contacts were identified, in complex cases 93% were reached, while in non-complex cases 61% were reached. Following more targets not being met and the percentage of close contacts traced being at a record low of 69.2%, Dido Harding said "NHS Test and Trace is working and every week we consistently reach the majority of people testing positive and their contacts".

The number of cases increased rapidly in September. By 23 September, the proportion of complex cases recorded by the system was small: 624 people reached, compared to 20,077 non-complex. The complex cases, by their nature, had many close contacts: 19,000 (an average of 30 per case) of whom 97.6% were reached. In contrast, there were 68,500 non-complex contacts (3.4 per case) of whom 61% were reached.

In November, a BBC report stated that in several areas – including some with the highest rates of infection – around half of the contacts of known cases were being traced. From 18 November, contact tracing calls to those under the age of 18 ceased to be made in cases where their parent or guardian had already been contacted.

Sample week, near the peak of the 2021 wave of infections: 7–13 January 2021
Positive COVID-19 tests referred to Test and Trace	People reached	Close contacts identified	Close contacts reached
351,567	304,789 (87%)	613,524	570,097 (93%)

Cumulative for the first 12 months, 28 May 2020 to 26 May 2021
Positive COVID-19 tests referred to Test and Trace	People reached	Close contacts identified	Close contacts reached
3.90 million	3.38 million (87%)	8.40 million	6.91 million (82%)

These statistics ceased to be published after 23 June 2022, following policy changes made in the preceding months under the government's "Living with COVID-19" plan.

== Reception ==
=== Effectiveness ===
In May 2020, the SAGE advisory body stated that, for the system to be effective, at least 80% of the contacts of an index case would need to be contacted.

In July, medical academic Prof Allyson Pollock wrote that the programme was "about as far from integrated or effective as you can get" and called on the government to publish details of its contracts with outsourcing companies.

On 19 September, the Guardian reported that the government was preparing to "shore up" the programme by drafting in teams of management consultants.

The British Medical Association (BMA) asked 8,190 doctors and medical students in England about their concerns about COVID-19; the results were published on 14 September 2020. 86% of respondents expected a second peak, and it was the main concern for 30%. 89% of respondents agreed or strongly agreed that the failure of test and trace risked causing a second wave.

On 21 September, a paper submitted to and endorsed by SAGE described the test, trace and isolate system as "having a marginal impact on transmission at the moment", owing to relatively low levels of engagement with the system, testing delays and likely poor rates of adherence with self-isolation. Some people would refuse to provide information when contacted or block the test and trace number.

In late October, the i-Sense research collaboration (funded by the Engineering and Physical Sciences Research Council) estimated end-to-end effectiveness to be 16%, as follows:

- Take 100 newly infected people
- Of these, 60 are estimated to be symptomatic
- Of these, around 39 are tested and receive a positive result
- Test and Trace reaches around 31 (81%), of whom 27 (85%) provide details of contacts
- Test and Trace reaches 16 (60%) of the contacts and advises them to isolate.

=== Costs ===
In March 2021, the Public Accounts Committee said it was not clear if the contribution of NHS Test and Trace to reducing infection levels could justify its "unimaginable" costs. They found that the system had never met its target to turnaround all tests in a face-to-face setting in 24 hours, and pointed out that although the system was set up with the aim of preventing future lockdowns, two more had been necessary. Dido Harding responded that the system was "making a real impact in breaking the chains of transmission".

=== Use of non-clinical staff ===
In late October 2020, as the second wave of infections put the service under strain, a spokesperson for the Department of Health and Social Care said that "experienced call handlers" were being reallocated to gather contact information from infected people, and an internal email said they would work alongside nurses and clinical staff.

=== Scams ===
Concerns were raised by members of the public and the media about how someone receiving a call from a contact tracer could be sure of it not being a scam. Speaking at the UK government's daily coronavirus briefing on 31 May, Dr Jenny Harries, the Deputy Chief Medical Officer for England, acknowledged those concerns but said it would quickly become apparent the call came from a professional, who "will make it very clear to you that they are calling for a particular reason. I think it will be very evident, when somebody rings you, these are professionally trained individuals and sitting over them are a group of senior clinical professionals."

During the contact tracing app trial on the Isle of Wight, the Chartered Trading Standards Institute found evidence of a phishing scam. Victims would receive a text stating that they had been in contact with someone with COVID-19 and were directed to a website to input their personal details.

=== Data protection ===
Concerns over data security and data protection have been raised. At launch, the programme did not have a Data Protection Impact Assessment, which is required by law. In July, it was reported that workers on contract were sharing patients' confidential information on social media support groups, due to a lack of alternative means to solve problems within their teams.

On 20 July, privacy campaigners the Open Rights Group obtained an admission from government lawyers that NHS Test and Trace was operating unlawfully and breached General Data Protection Regulations (GDPR) because an overarching impact assessment had not been carried out. In response the UK Government said there was no evidence that data had been shared with third parties.

=== International comparisons ===
Although countries keep records in different ways, the Our World in Data research team from the University of Oxford said that the UK was performing more tests than many other countries. As of 14 September 2020, they show that at 2.76 tests per 1,000 people, the UK rate was ahead of most countries, including the major European countries: Belgium (2.3), Russia (2.1), France (2.07), Ireland (2.07), Norway (2.03), Germany (1.79), Sweden (1.78), Spain (1.77), Switzerland (1.42), Netherlands (1.36), Austria (1.35), Italy (0.91) and Poland (0.46).

== In other UK countries ==
Similar programmes were put in place in the other countries of the UK. Northern Ireland became the first constituent country to reintroduce contact tracing when, on 23 April 2020, its Chief Medical Officer, Michael McBride, announced that a scheme was "active". Following a pilot, the system became fully operational in Northern Ireland on Monday 18 May. Northern Ireland was the first part of the UK to launch a contact-tracing app, which was launched on 30 July. The app ran on both IOS and Android operating systems, but the developer said that it would not work on iPhone 6 or older Apple devices.

Plans for Test & Protect, a contact tracing service in Scotland, were published by the Scottish Government on 26 May 2020, and it was launched on 28 May, shortly after NHS Test and Trace went live; a companion app 'Protect Scotland' was launched to the public on 10 September.

The service in Wales, run by NHS Wales and known as 'Test, Trace, Protect', launched on 1 June 2020.
