= Jenny Harries =

English physician Former Deputy Chief Medical Officer for England (born 1960)

Dame Jennifer Harries DBE
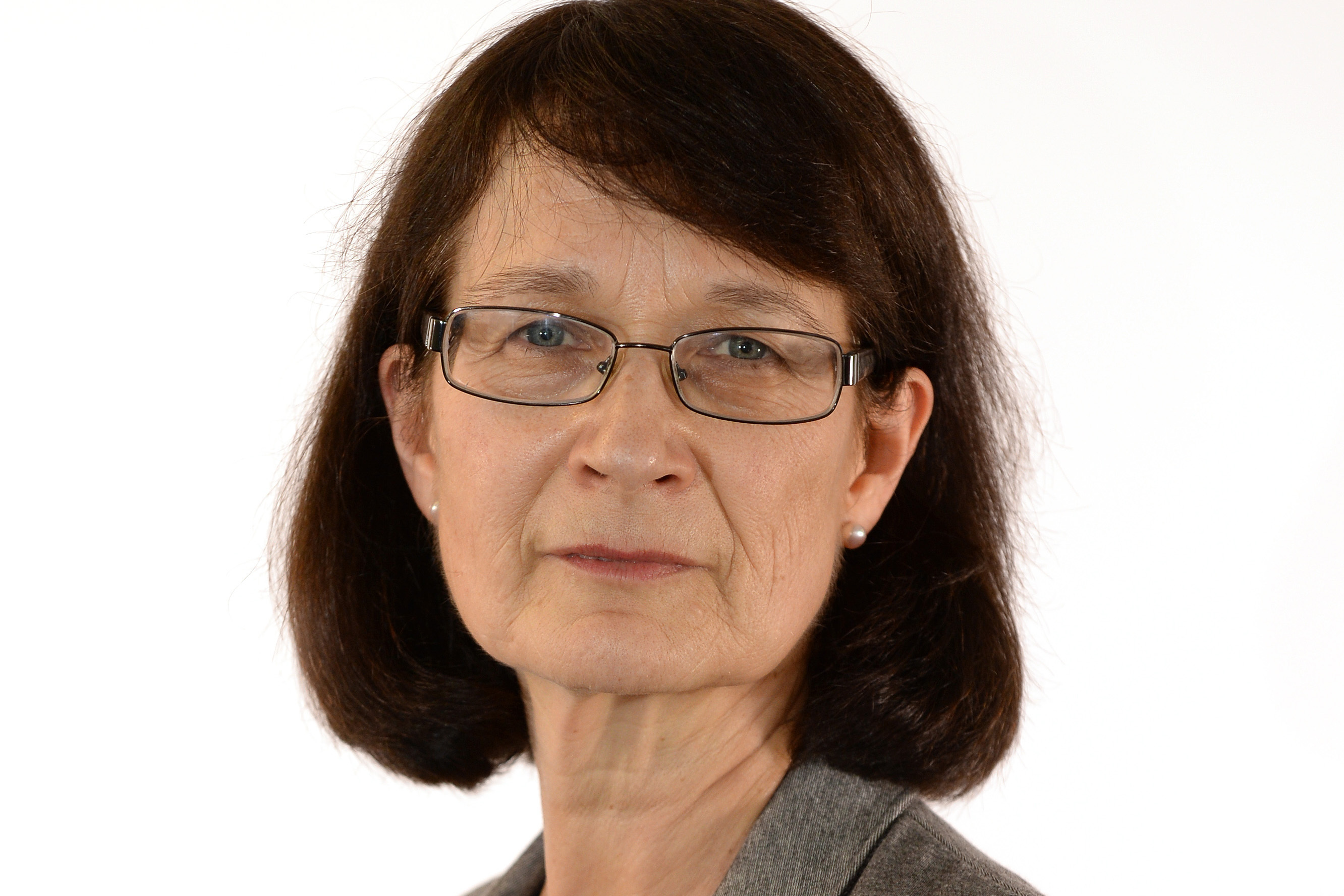

Chief Executive of the UK Health Security Agency
- In office 7 May 2021 – 31 May 2025
- Prime Minister: Boris Johnson; Liz Truss; Rishi Sunak; Keir Starmer
- Preceded by: Dido Harding (Acting)
- Succeeded by: Dyfed Alsop (Acting)

Deputy Chief Medical Officer for England
- In office 7 June 2019 – 31 March 2021 Serving with Jonathan Van-Tam (from 2017); Aidan Fowler (from 2020)
- Preceded by: Gina Radford
- Succeeded by: Dr Thomas Waite (Interim)

Personal details
- Born: Jennifer Margaret Harries; ~1960 Watford, Hertfordshire, England
- Education: Haberdashers' Monmouth School for Girls
- Alma mater: University of Birmingham
- Profession: Public health physician
- Website: gov.uk/government/people/jenny-harries

Dame Jennifer Margaret Harries DBE is a retired British public health physician and civil servant. She was the chief executive of the UK Health Security Agency and head of NHS Test and Trace from May 2021 until June 2025. She was previously a regional director at Public Health England, and then Deputy Chief Medical Officer for England from June 2019 until her UKHSA appointment in 2021.

== Early life and education ==
Born in Monmouth, Harries studied medicine at the University of Birmingham, gaining an intercalated BSc in pharmacology in 1981 and medical degrees, MB ChB, in 1984.

== Career ==
Harries was Regional Director for the South of England for Public Health England from February 2013 before being appointed Deputy Chief Medical officer for England in June 2019. The appointment of a new Chief Medical Officer for England, Chris Whitty, was announced simultaneously.

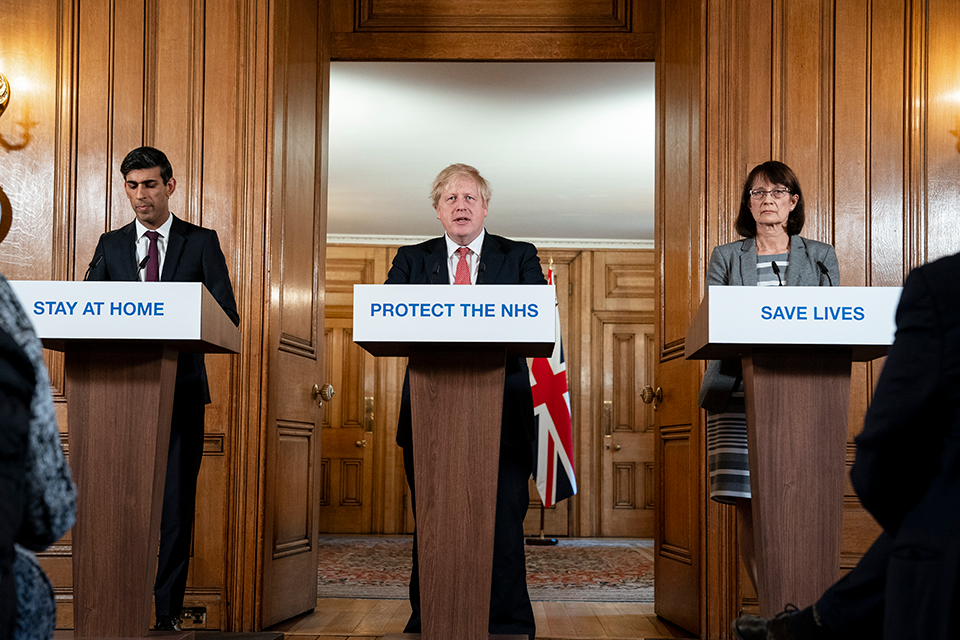
At a press conference with Prime Minister Boris Johnson and Chancellor of the Exchequer Rishi Sunak (20 March 2020)

Effective 7 May 2021, Harries was appointed as the first chief executive of the new UK Health Security Agency, which combines Public Health England and England's NHS Test and Trace. Although the organisation was established on 1 April 2021, Harries assumed this role following a hand-over period which lasted until Dido Harding, the interim chief executive, departed on 7 May 2021.

She retired from the civil service on 31 May 2025. In November 2025, Harries was installed as the Chancellor of the University of Chester.

=== Role in the UK government response to the COVID-19 pandemic ===
Harries appeared at some of the daily press conferences held by the UK government to provide updates about the COVID-19 pandemic. She contributed medical information and answered questions from the press; however some of her statements, including suggesting that those receiving fake virus-tracing phone calls could identify them from the tone of the conversation, or that the UK had a "perfectly adequate supply of PPE", met with controversy and calls by scientists such as Professor Anthony Costello, director of University College London's Institute for Global Health, for her to resign.

In early March 2020, Harries stated "the virus will not survive very long outside," and "many outdoor events, particularly, are relatively safe," and warned that it was "not a good idea" for members of the public to wear a mask in which the virus could get trapped, thus increasing the risk of infection. Cheltenham Festival, a four-day event started weeks later and attended by about 150,000 people, was referred to in the following month by Sir David King, the government's chief scientific adviser from 2000 to 2007, as "the best possible way to accelerate the spread of the virus".

Harries suggested in March 2020 that the World Health Organization (WHO)'s advice to "test, test, test" people for COVID-19 and trace their contacts was primarily intended for countries that were less well developed than the UK, arguing that "there comes a point in a pandemic where that is not an appropriate intervention": "The clue for WHO is in its title. It is a World Health Organization and it is addressing all countries across the world with entirely different health infrastructures and particularly public health infrastructures. We have an extremely well-developed public health system in this country and in fact our public health teams actually train others abroad. So the point there is that they are addressing every country, including low- and middle-income countries, so encouraging all countries to test of some type," Harries said; other highly developed countries remained committed to extensive testing and experienced fewer deaths.

Harries also suggested that the risk of flu or road accident was higher than that posed by COVID-19 for schoolchildren.

In December 2021, The Daily Telegraph reported that it was understood that Harries was the source of a contested figure that there was an average 17-day delay between infection and hospitalisation for COVID-19, used by Health Secretary Sajid Javid. Former Treasury statistician Simon Briscoe was quoted as saying that the figure seemed like either a "deliberate statistical sleight of hand designed to deceive, or incompetence" and that if deliberate, officials were "in effect trying to buy time, as officials realise that data of rising hospitalisations is needed to justify lockdown".

In November 2023, the UK COVID-19 Inquiry heard that Harries had recommended in an email that, in the worst situation, elderly COVID-positive patients should be discharged into residential care homes to manage capacity problems in hospitals. The impact on care facilities was controversial, and was linked to the deaths of thousands of people in care homes.

== Honours and awards ==
Harries was appointed Officer of the Order of the British Empire (OBE) in the 2016 New Year Honours and Dame Commander of the Order of the British Empire (DBE) in the 2022 New Year Honours for services to health.

In 2023, she was commissioned as a Deputy Lieutenant of Gwent.
