= Susan Hopkins =

Irish epidemiologist and civil servant in the UK

Susan Hopkins CBE is an Irish epidemiologist and civil servant working in the UK. She is Professor of Infectious Diseases and Health Security at University College London and honorary clinical senior lecturer in the Department of Medicine at Imperial College London, and Chief Executive Officer of the UK Health Security Agency (UKHSA).

== Career ==
Hopkins studied medicine at Trinity College Dublin and trained in infectious diseases, microbiology and epidemiology in Ireland, France and the UK. In 2006, she was appointed a consultant in infectious diseases and microbiology at the Royal Free Hospital. She became Clinical Director of Infection Services at the Royal Free London NHS Foundation Trust, and Deputy Director of the National Infection Service at Public Health England.

In 2018, she was called as a witness by the Health and Social Care Committee on antimicrobial resistance.

In January 2020, Hopkins was appointed Incident Director within Public Health England's COVID-19 incident response. In August 2021 she was appointed Interim Chief Medical Advisor at NHS Test and Trace and the Strategic Response Director for COVID-19 at Public Health England.

In November 2021, Hopkins raised concerns about the new B.1.1.529 variant, later named the omicron variant, of COVID-19. In December 2021 she warned that further restrictions might be needed to tackle an "inevitable" and "big wave of infections".

== Awards ==
In December 2021, Hopkins was awarded the Presidential Distinguished Service Award by Michael D. Higgins.

In May 2022, she was awarded as Honorary Commander of the Order of the British Empire (CBE), for services to Public Health.

She was elected a Fellow of the Academy of Medical Sciences in 2023.
