= Dido Harding =

British businesswoman and Conservative life peer (born 1967)

The Right Honourable The Baroness Harding of Winscombe
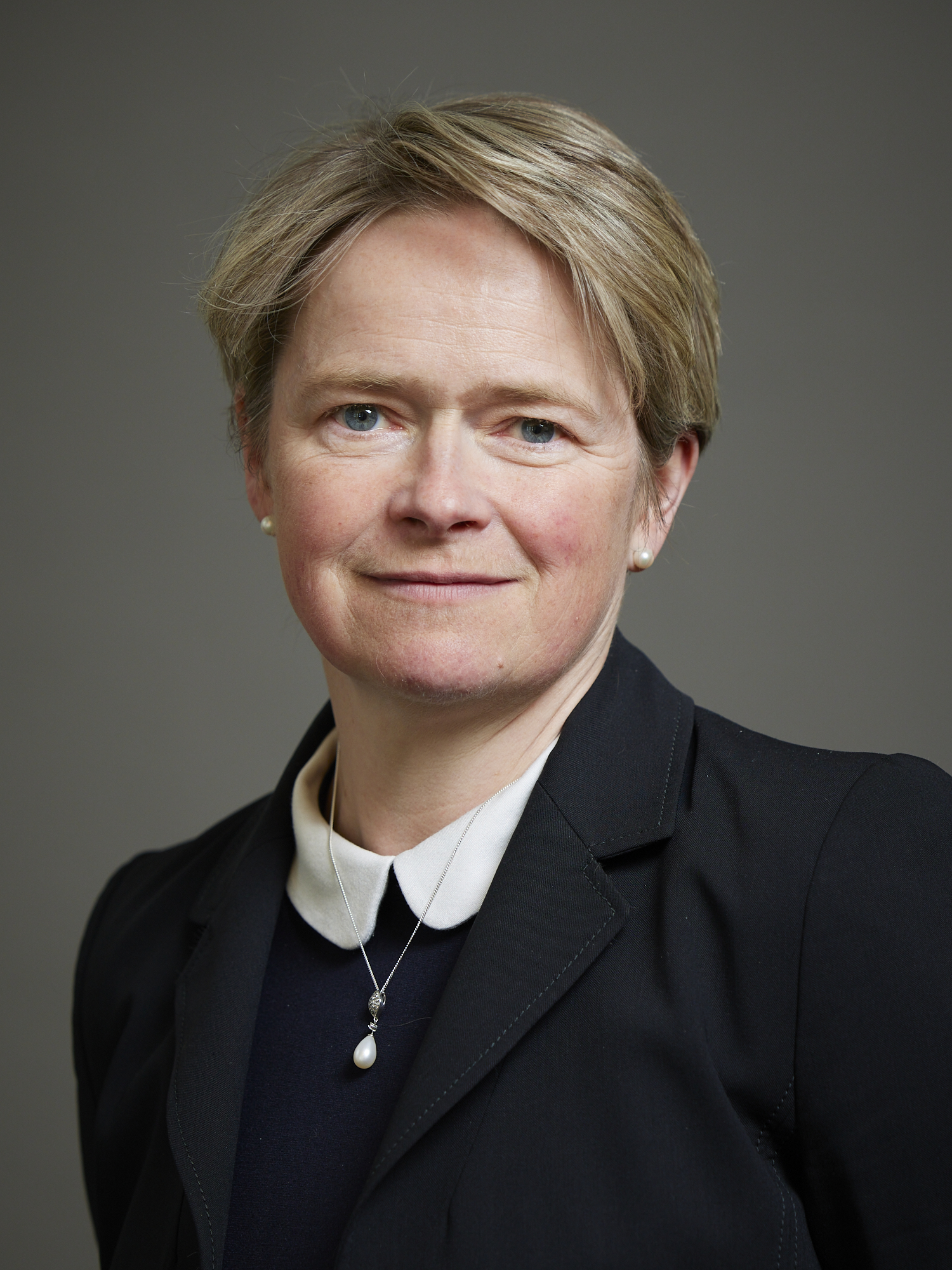
- Harding in 2023

Chief Executive of the UK Health Security Agency
- Interim; 18 August 2020 – 7 May 2021
- Prime Minister: Boris Johnson
- Preceded by: Duncan Selbie (CEO of Public Health England)
- Succeeded by: Jenny Harries

Head of NHS Test and Trace
- In office 7 May 2020 – 7 May 2021
- Prime Minister: Boris Johnson
- Preceded by: Office established
- Succeeded by: Jenny Harries

Chair of NHS Improvement
- In office 9 October 2017 – October 2021
- Prime Minister: Theresa May; Boris Johnson
- Deputy: Richard Douglas; Andrew Valentine Morris
- Preceded by: Ed Smith
- Succeeded by: Andrew Valentine Morris

Member of the House of Lords
- Lord Temporal
- Life peerage 15 September 2014

Personal details
- Born: Diana Mary Harding; November 1967 (age 58–59)
- Party: Conservative
- Spouse: John Penrose (m. 1995)
- Children: 2
- Parent: John Harding, 2nd Baron Harding of Petherton (father)
- Relatives: John Harding, 1st Baron Harding of Petherton (grandfather)
- Education: Magdalen College, Oxford; Harvard Business School (MBA)

Diana Mary "Dido" Harding, Baroness Harding of Winscombe is a Member of the House of Lords and a British businesswoman, formally the Chief Executive of the TalkTalk Group from 2010 to 2017. She has held a number of senior positions at other British businesses. She is Chair of The Jockey Club, which is responsible for several major horse racing events including the Cheltenham Festival.

Baroness Harding has also held a successful career in the public sector, appointed as Executive Chair of NHS Test and Trace in May 2020, which was established to track and help prevent the spread of COVID-19 in England. Harding was also appointed interim chief executive of the then National Institute for Health Protection, later renamed the UK Health Security Agency. She left that role soon after the new agency was established in April 2021.

== Early life ==
Harding is the daughter of John Harding, 2nd Baron Harding of Petherton, and the granddaughter of Field Marshal John Harding, 1st Baron Harding of Petherton, who commanded the Desert Rats for a few months in World War II.

Raised on the family pig farm in Dorset, she was educated from 1978 to 1985 at St Antony's Leweston, then an all-girl private Catholic school. She then graduated in Philosophy, Politics and Economics, from Magdalen College, Oxford, and then studied at Harvard Business School, gaining an MBA.

== Career ==
Upon graduating in 1988 she joined the management consultancy McKinsey & Company.

== Early consumer roles ==
In 1995 she was appointed marketing director of Thomas Cook before moving to Manpower and Kingfisher in 1998 and Woolworths in 1999. From 2000 to 2004 she was "commercial director for value added foods" and then "international support director" at Tesco. In 2007 she moved to Sainsbury's as convenience store director, and took a seat on the operating board in 2008.

=== TalkTalk chief executive ===
Harding was named the first CEO of TalkTalk in 2010, when Carphone Warehouse split its telecoms business from its retail operation. She was appointed as a non-executive director on The Court of The Bank of England in July 2014. She has also served on the boards of British Land and Cheltenham Racecourse.

In October 2015, TalkTalk experienced a cyber-attack, during which personal and banking details of up to four million customers, not all of which were encrypted, were thought to have been accessed. City A.M. described her responses as "naive", noting that early on, when asked if the affected customer data was encrypted or not, she replied: "The awful truth is that I don't know". Her inflexible line on termination fees was also criticised. The Evening Standard noted that "It has been a tough week for TalkTalk boss Dido Harding, facing complaints from customers and calls for her head". The company admitted the incident had cost it £60 million and lost it 95,000 customers. Fining the company £400,000, the Information Commissioner Elizabeth Denham blamed a "failure to implement the most basic cyber security measures."

In February 2017, Harding announced that she would stand down as CEO of TalkTalk in order to focus more on her public service activities. In January 2018 she joined the main board of the Jockey Club, which runs many of British horse racing's most popular events, including the Grand National, the Cheltenham Festival and the Derby.

== Other roles ==
In January 2018 she joined the main board of the Jockey Club, which runs many of British horse racing's most popular events, including the Grand National, the Cheltenham Festival and the Derby.

She was appointed as a non-executive director on The Court of The Bank of England in July 2014. She has also served on the boards of British Land and Cheltenham Racecourse.

=== Political service ===
Harding joined the House of Lords as a Conservative life peer on 20 October 2014. She has sat on a number of committees including the Economic Affairs Committee(2017-2022), the Finance Bill Sub Committee (2021-2022,) the Communications and Digital Committee (2022-2025) and currently sits on the Industry and Regulators Committee.

Her primary focus of parliamentary work is on digital regulation, competition and online safety. She has closely worked with Baroness Kidron on the creation of the Age Appropriate Design Code into the Data Protection Act, the Online Safety Act and Digital Markets, Competition and Consumers Act. She has tabled amendments such as a focus on legal duties to be placed on app stores to block children from accessing adult-only apps, with cross party support from across the House. Online Safety Bill takes aim at app stores — Atticus Partners Apple and Google app stores ‘should have same legal duties as corner shops’

In the 2026 Kings Speech debate, Baroness Harding raised her concerns about the Competition Reform Bill, particularly the Competition and Markets Authority's independence to implement the Digital Markets, Competition and Consumers Act, protection of copyrighted content for owners, sustainable economic growth and the government’s position on AI.

=== Public healthcare leadership ===
In October 2017, Harding was appointed chair of NHS Improvement, which is responsible for overseeing all NHS hospitals, comprising foundation trusts and NHS trusts, as well as independent providers of NHS-funded care. Parliament's Health Select Committee, at that time chaired by then Conservative MP Sarah Wollaston, recommended that Harding resign as a Conservative peer and sit as a crossbench peer in order to "allow for greater parliamentary and public confidence in her ability to challenge government ministers and policies if this role demands it". Harding did not accept this. Her role ceased in July 2022, when NHS Improvement was merged into NHS England.

In May 2020, Health Secretary Matt Hancock announced that Harding was to be put in charge of the "track, test and trace" programme (later given the name NHS Test and Trace) as part of the UK government's response to the COVID-19 pandemic. In November 2020, a case was lodged jointly by the not-for-profit Good Law Project and the Runnymede Trust, a race equality think tank, to challenge the legality of this appointment. In February 2022, two High Court judges ruled that Hancock had failed to comply with the Equality Act 2010 when appointing Harding, and also when appointing Mike Coupe as director of testing in September 2020. The court was told that Harding intervened to add Coupe, a former colleague of hers at Sainsbury's, to the shortlist of candidates.

On 18 June 2020, it was announced by Hancock that the UK government intended to switch its contact-recording mobile phone app from a centralised model to the decentralised approach pioneered by Apple and Google, due to privacy concerns, among other things. Harding was to decide on the suitability of the alternative model. She stated that "what we've done in really rigorously testing both our own COVID-19 app and the Google-Apple version is demonstrate that none of them are working sufficiently well to be actually reliable to determine whether any of us should self-isolate for two weeks [and] that's true across the world". The change was, however, widely interpreted in the press as an abandonment of the UK's app in favour of the Apple-Google one, and a U-turn by the government. The BBC also reported that the "latest developments come a day after the BBC revealed that a former Apple executive, Simon Thompson, was taking charge of the late-running project as part of Baroness Harding's team".

In August 2020, the government announced a merger between Public Health England and NHS Test and Trace to form the National Institute for Health Protection, with Harding as interim chief executive. The appointment was criticised by health experts as she did not have a background in health, and because of her political position. The Guardian quoted allies of hers who, in response, said that she had quickly learned after being appointed chair of NHS Improvement in 2017 and that she had a record of "getting things done" while working in business.

During this time, Harding was considered a divisive figure and was accused by the Good Law Project of being appointed to the role due to personal or political connections.

The Judicial Review between the Runnymede Trust and the Good Law Project vs. the government threw out these claims, ruling that: "The evidence provides no support for this at all. Baroness Harding had previous relevant experience of senior positions in large retail businesses and in the NHS. Mr Coupe had vast experience of managing complex public-facing organisations". "The collective effect of the conclusions set out during this judgment is that the claim brought by Good Law Project fails in its entirety".

In January 2021, Harding defended spending upwards of £1,000-a-day each on consultants for the contact tracing programme. Appearing before the Public Accounts Committee, Harding told MPs she felt it was "appropriate" to bring in external help in "extreme emergency circumstances".

The merged agency was established on 1 April 2021, by which time it was called the UK Health Security Agency, and Harding handed over the leadership role to Jenny Harries.

From June to August 2021, Harding took a temporary leave of absence from her role as chair of NHS Improvement to apply for the position of Chief Executive of NHS England, with Sir Andrew Valentine Morris acting in the interim. Harding was eliminated at an early stage with the job eventually going to Amanda Pritchard. Morris was subsequently appointed chair on a permanent basis following Harding's resignation from the position in October 2021.

== Honours and awards ==
In February 2013, she was included in that year's list of the hundred most powerful women in the UK by Woman's Hour on BBC Radio 4. The following year, she was named in the ten most influential women in the BBC Woman's Hour Power List 2014.

Harding is an Honorary Doctor of Business Administration at Anglia Ruskin University.

== Personal life ==
In October 1995, she married John Penrose, who was MP for Weston-super-Mare from 2005 to 2024 and held junior minister posts from 2010 to 2019. The couple met while working at McKinsey, and have two daughters.

Harding is a horse racing enthusiast and member of the Jockey Club, joining the main board in January 2018. In 1993 she borrowed £7,000 from her bank to buy an Irish thoroughbred to ride in ladies' point-to-point races. In 1998, her horse Cool Dawn won the Cheltenham Gold Cup. Harding rode Cool Dawn herself for three seasons, achieving second place in the 1996 Foxhunter Chase at Cheltenham. She said that the horse: "... taught me that dreams come true, sometimes, that actually miracles can happen. Isn't that a great gift? I think it shaped my business career ...".

== Books ==
- Harding, Dido (8 March 1999). Cool Dawn: My National Velvet. Mainstream Publishing. ISBN 1-84018-179-6.. Harding's memoir.

== Arms ==
Coat of arms of Dido Harding
Notes Baroness Harding of Winscombe's arms are those of her father, John Harding, 2nd Baron Harding of Petherton, but on a lozenge-shaped shield. Coronet Coronet of a Baron Escutcheon Argent, on a Bend Azure, between two Lions passant guardant Gules, two Kukris in saltire between two Martlets Or.
