= 2020 in United Kingdom politics and government =

== Events ==
=== January ===
- 4 January – The Foreign Office warns British nationals against all but essential travel to Iran and Iraq, following a US airstrike in Baghdad the previous day in which Iranian general Qasem Soleimani was killed.
- 5 January – Boris Johnson says "we will not lament" Qasem Soleimani's death as he calls for "de-escalation from all sides".
- 6 January – Downing Street states that Britain will not support U.S. President Donald Trump's threat to bomb Iranian cultural and heritage sites.
- 7 January – The Labour Party leadership election formally begins, with the new leader scheduled to be announced on 4 April.
- 8 January – Prince Harry and Meghan, the Duke and Duchess of Sussex, announce that they plan to "step back as senior members" of Britain's royal family, and divide their time between the UK and North America.
- 9 January
  - The UK and Irish governments publish a deal aimed at restoring the Northern Ireland Executive; the Democratic Unionist Party gives its backing to the agreement.
  - The House of Commons gives its third and final backing to the Withdrawal Agreement Bill, voting 330 to 231 in favour; the bill now passes to the House of Lords for scrutiny.
- 10 January – Sinn Féin gives its backing to a deal to restore power-sharing government to Northern Ireland for the first time since 2017.
- 11 January
  - The Northern Ireland Assembly reconvenes after a three-year hiatus; DUP leader Arlene Foster is appointed Northern Ireland's first minister, while Sinn Féin's Michelle O'Neill is appointed deputy first minister.
  - Robert Macaire, the British ambassador to Iran, is detained in Iran after attending a vigil for those killed on Ukraine International Airlines Flight 752. He is summoned to appear at Iran's foreign ministry the following day, for being "an unknown foreigner in an illegal gathering".
- 22 January – Boris Johnson's EU withdrawal deal successfully completes its passage through parliament, with the EU Withdrawal Agreement Bill being voted through without change, after several amendments proposed by the House of Lords are rejected.
- 23 January –
  - Parliamentary ratification of Boris Johnson's EU withdrawal deal is completed with Royal Assent being given to the EU Withdrawal Agreement Bill.
  - Prince Charles ignores and walks past U.S. Vice President Mike Pence without shaking his hand at the World Holocaust Forum in Jerusalem.
- 31 January
  - The United Kingdom and Gibraltar leave the European Union, beginning an 11-month transition period, during which they remain in the Single Market and Customs Union.
  - The BBC and ITV main news bulletins choose not to broadcast in its entirety a three-minute speech recorded by Prime Minister Boris Johnson scheduled for 10pm, an hour before Brexit.

=== February ===
- 4 February – In London, Prime Minister Boris Johnson, naturalist Sir David Attenborough, and Italian Prime Minister Giuseppe Conte launch the 26th session of the Conference of the Parties (COP26), a major UN climate summit to be held in Glasgow in November 2020. Johnson announces, subject to consultation, that coal power could be phased out by 2024, a year earlier than previously planned and the phase-out of new petrol and diesel vehicles could be brought forward from 2040 to 2035. He also reaffirms the UK's commitment to reaching net zero carbon by 2050.
- 7 February – Buckingham Palace announces that the wedding of Princess Beatrice and Edoardo Mapelli Mozzi will take place on 29 May.
- 10 February – In a "historic" decision, councillors reject a proposed expansion of Bristol Airport, by 18 votes to seven, on the grounds that it would exacerbate climate change, damage the health of local people, and harm flora and fauna.
- 11 February –
  - In the wake of the Streatham stabbing, the Terrorist Offenders Bill, designed to end the early release of prisoners convicted of terrorist offences, is presented to parliament.
  - Following a review of the project, Prime Minister Boris Johnson announces that the controversial high-speed rail link HS2 will be built.
- 12 February –
  - The Terrorist Offenders Bill passes unopposed through the House of Commons to complete the first stage of the process to becoming law.
  - The government announces plans to extend the remit of the media regulator Ofcom to include internet and social media content in the UK.
- 13 February –
  - Boris Johnson carries out a cabinet reshuffle.
  - Sajid Javid resigns as Chancellor of the Exchequer. He is succeeded by Rishi Sunak.
- 17 February – Business and Energy Secretary and COP26 President Alok Sharma announces £1.2 billion in funding for a new supercomputer to improve weather and climate models in the UK.
- 27 February – Count Binface announces he will run for Mayor of London.
- 29 February – The Home Office's top civil servant, Sir Philip Rutnam, resigns and says he plans to claim constructive dismissal by the government following a series of clashes with the Home Secretary, Priti Patel.

=== March ===
- 2 March – The government holds a COBRA meeting to discuss its preparations and response to the coronavirus, as the number of UK cases jumps to 36.
- 3 March – The government publishes its action plan for dealing with coronavirus. This includes scenarios ranging from a milder pandemic to a "severe prolonged pandemic as experienced in 1918" and warns that a fifth of the national workforce could be absent from work during the infection's peak.
- 6 March – The Prime Minister announces £46 million in funding for research into a coronavirus vaccine and rapid diagnostic tests. During a visit to a laboratory in Bedfordshire, he says: "It looks like there will be a substantial period of disruption where we have to deal with this outbreak."
- 11 March – Chancellor of the Exchequer, Rishi Sunak, presents the Johnson Government's first budget, which includes £30 billion in measures to protect the economy from coronavirus.
- 13 March – Elections including the English local elections, London mayoral election and police and crime commissioner elections, scheduled for May 2020, are postponed for a year because of the coronavirus.
- 14 March – Vice President of the United States, Mike Pence, announces the US is to extend its European coronavirus travel ban to include the UK from 16 March.
- 15 March
  - The Foreign Office advises against "all but essential travel" to the US.
  - Health Secretary Matt Hancock says that every UK resident over the age of 70 will be told "within the coming weeks" to self-isolate for "a very long time" to shield them from coronavirus.
  - The government announces plans to hold daily televised press conferences to update the public on the fight against the coronavirus pandemic, starting on Monday 16 March.
- 16 March – Prime Minister Boris Johnson advises everyone in the UK against "non-essential" travel and contact with others to curb coronavirus, as well as suggesting people should avoid pubs, clubs and theatres, and work from home if possible. Pregnant women, people over the age of 70 and those with certain health conditions are urged to consider the advice "particularly important", and will be asked to self-isolate within days.
- 17 March – The Chancellor, Rishi Sunak, announces that £330bn will be made available in loan guarantees for businesses affected by the coronavirus.
- 18 March
  - The government announces that all schools in the country will shut from the afternoon of Friday 20 March, except for those looking after the children of keyworkers and vulnerable children. No exams will take place this academic year, Education Secretary Gavin Williamson confirms.
  - The government announces emergency legislation to bring in a complete ban on new evictions for three months as part of measures to help protect renters in social and private rented accommodation.
- 20 March
  - Chancellor Rishi Sunak announces that the government will pay 80% of wages for employees not working, up to £2,500 a month, as part of "unprecedented" measures to protect people's jobs.
  - Prime Minister Boris Johnson orders all cafes, pubs and restaurants to close from the evening of 20 March, except for take-away food, to tackle coronavirus. All the UK's nightclubs, theatres, cinemas, gyms and leisure centres are told to close "as soon as they reasonably can".
- 21 March – Environment Secretary George Eustice urges shoppers to stop panic buying, as supermarkets around the UK struggle to keep up with demand. Tesco, Asda, Aldi Süd, and Lidl are reported to have begun a recruitment drive for up to 30,000 new staff.
- 22 March –Boris Johnson warns that "tougher measures" may be introduced if people do not follow government advice on social distancing.
- 23 March
  - The government announces emergency measures to safeguard the nation's rail network, with season ticket holders given refunds if working from home, and rail franchise agreements nationalised for at least six months to prevent rail companies from collapsing.
  - Alex Salmond is cleared of sexually assaulting nine women while he was Scotland's First Minister.
  - In a televised address, Boris Johnson announces a UK-wide lockdown with immediate effect, to contain the spread of the coronavirus. People can leave their homes only for "very limited purposes" – shopping for basic necessities; for one form of exercise a day; for any medical need; and to travel to and from work when "absolutely necessary". A number of other restrictions are imposed, with police given powers to enforce the measures, including the use of fines.
- 24 March – Health secretary Matt Hancock announces the government will open a temporary hospital, the NHS Nightingale Hospital London at the Excel London, to add extra critical care capacity in response to coronavirus pandemic.
- 25 March – Parliament shuts down for a month.
- 26 March – The government announces that the self-employed will be paid 80% of profits, up to £2,500 a month, to help them cope during the economic crisis triggered by COVID-19.
- 27 March
  - Prime Minister Boris Johnson tests positive for COVID-19, and will self-isolate in 10 Downing Street.
  - Health Secretary Matt Hancock tests positive for COVID-19 and reports that he is working from home and self-isolating.

=== April ===
- 4 April – Sir Keir Starmer is confirmed as the new leader of the Labour Party, succeeding Jeremy Corbyn.
- 5 April – Prime Minister Boris Johnson is admitted to hospital for tests after testing positive for coronavirus ten days earlier.
- 6 April – Prime Minister Boris Johnson is taken into intensive care after being admitted to hospital for coronavirus the day before. It is announced that First Secretary of State Dominic Raab will deputise for him.
- 9 April
  - Foreign Secretary Dominic Raab says the UK is "starting to see the impact" of the restrictions but that it is "too early" to lift them, and urges people to stay indoors over the Easter weekend.
  - Prime Minister Boris Johnson is moved out of intensive care, but remains in hospital.
- 12 April – Prime Minister Boris Johnson is discharged from hospital after being treated for coronavirus and will continue his recovery at Chequers.
- 16 April – Foreign Secretary Dominic Raab announces a three-week extension to the nationwide lockdown measures as the number of confirmed COVID-19 cases in the UK surpasses 100,000.
- 19 April – Michael Gove, in a BBC interview with Andrew Marr, concedes that the Prime Minister missed five COBRA meetings in the early stages of the viral outbreak, and that the UK shipped protective equipment to China in February.
- 22 April – MPs take part in the first "virtual" Prime Minister's Questions, via video conferencing service Zoom.
- 27 April – Boris Johnson returns to work after three weeks of illness. In his first speech outside 10 Downing Street since recovering from coronavirus, he urges the public not to lose patience with the lockdown, warning that the UK is at the moment of "maximum risk".
- 28 April – The Scottish government recommends that people cover their faces in certain enclosed public spaces like shops and public transport: UK ministers are considering the issue
- 29 April – Boris Johnson's Fiancée, Carrie Symonds gives birth to a son.

=== May ===
- 4 May – MP Conor Burns resigns as Minister of State for Trade Policy after a report found he used his position as an MP to intimidate a member of the public.
- 5 May – Professor Neil Ferguson, a prominent scientific adviser to the government, resigns from the government's Scientific Advisory Group for Emergencies after apparently behaving contrary to the government's messages on social distancing by meeting his "married lover".
- 6 May – The National Assembly for Wales is renamed Senedd Cymru – Welsh Parliament.
- 10 May – COVID-19 pandemic in England: The government reveals that its lockdown slogan "Stay Home. Protect the NHS. Save Lives." is to be replaced, in England, with the new message, "Stay alert. Control the virus. Save lives", while Scotland, Wales and Northern Ireland are sticking with "stay at home". A new alert scale system for England is also announced, ranging from green (level one) to red (level five), similar to the UK's Terror Threat Levels.
- 12 May
  - The British furlough scheme is extended until October, with employees continuing to receive 80% of their monthly wages up to £2,500. A quarter of the workforce, some 7.5 million people, are now covered by the scheme, costing £14bn a month.
  - COVID-19 pandemic in Northern Ireland: The Northern Ireland Executive publishes its five-stage policy for easing lockdown without a timetable and titled Executive Approach to Decision-Making.
- 14 May – COVID-19 pandemic in Northern Ireland: The first minister Arlene Foster announces that scientific data is sufficiently encouraging to begin easing the lockdown on Monday 18 May.
- 18 May
  - COVID-19 pandemic in Scotland: First minister Nicola Sturgeon announces that lockdown restrictions in Scotland will be eased from 28 May and that anyone over the age of five can now be tested for SARS-CoV-2.
  - COVID-19 pandemic in Northern Ireland: The first easing of lockdown in NI is rolled out, with garden centres and recycling facilities reopening.
- 19 May – COVID-19 pandemic in Northern Ireland: the Northern Ireland Executive announces the first stage of its lockdown-ending policy would go fully into effect, re-opening certain entertainment and sports facilities. Arlene Foster announced contact tracing would begin in Northern Ireland. Robin Swann announced all residents and staff of care homes were to be tested by the end of June.
- 23 May – Dominic Cummings scandal: Dominic Cummings, Boris Johnson's senior adviser, faces calls to resign after a joint investigation by the Daily Mirror and The Guardian alleges that he travelled 260 miles from London to his parents' home in Durham, and whilst he was displaying COVID-19 symptoms, during lockdown.
- 24 May – Dominic Cummings scandal: After The Observer and the Sunday Mirror print allegations that Dominic Cummings made a second trip to the North East during lockdown, Boris Johnson expresses his support for his senior adviser during the government's coronavirus daily briefing, saying he had acted "responsibly, legally and with integrity".
- 25 May – Dominic Cummings scandal: Dominic Cummings says "I don't regret what I did" as he addresses criticism for his actions in an unprecedented public statement from a senior adviser in the 10 Downing Street Rose Garden.
- 26 May – Dominic Cummings scandal: Junior minister Douglas Ross resigns, saying that Dominic Cummings' view on lockdown guidance is "not shared by the vast majority of people who have done as the government asked."
- 27 May – Dominic Cummings scandal: Boris Johnson appears before the House of Commons Liaison Committee for the first time, during which he rules out an inquiry into Dominic Cummings' actions during lockdown.
- 28 May
  - COVID-19 pandemic in Scotland: First Minister of Scotland Nicola Sturgeon confirms an easing of the lockdown in Scotland from Friday 29 May with people able to meet friends and family outside in groups of no more than eight, but keeping two metres apart.
  - The government approves Cleve Hill Solar Park on the north Kent coast, the UK's biggest ever solar farm at 900 acres in size and 350MW of capacity, enough to power over 91,000 homes.
  - Dominic Cummings scandal: Durham Constabulary conclude that no offence had been committed by Dominic Cummings in travelling from London to Durham during lockdown. They also say that a minor breach of the lockdown rules might have occurred at Barnard Castle, but because there was no apparent breach of the social distancing rules, no further action would be taken.
- 29 May
  - COVID-19 in the UK: Chancellor Rishi Sunak confirms that the Coronavirus Job Retention Scheme will end at the end of October, with employers having to pay National Insurance and pension contributions from August, 10% of pay from September, and then 20% in October.
  - COVID-19 pandemic in Wales: First Minister of Wales Mark Drakeford announces an easing of lockdown restrictions in Wales from 1 June, allowing people from two different households to meet outdoors whilst socially distancing.
- 30 May – COVID-19 pandemic in England: Boris Johnson announces a relaxing of restrictions in England for the 2.2 million clinically extremely vulnerable individuals who have been "shielding" in their homes, allowing them to spend time outdoors for the first time in ten weeks from 1 June.
- 31 May – COVID-19 pandemic in England: Foreign Secretary Dominic Raab defends the government's decision to ease lockdown restrictions after concerns from scientists that there could be a new spike in SARS-CoV-2 infections, insisting that England "can't just stay in lockdown forever".

=== June ===
- 3 June
  - COVID-19 in the UK:
    - Home Secretary Priti Patel confirms plans to force almost all arrivals to the UK to self-isolate for 14 days from 8 June, and warns that failure to adhere to quarantine conditions in England could result in a £1,000 fine.
    - Business Secretary Alok Sharma, after sweating profusely during a statement to the Commons self-isolates at home, but tests negative for COVID-19 a day later.
- 4 June – COVID-19 pandemic in England: Transport Secretary Grant Shapps announces that wearing face coverings will be made compulsory on public transport in England from 15 June.
- 8 June – Prime Minister Boris Johnson acknowledges the "undeniable feeling of injustice" motivating anti-racism protests caused by the murder of George Floyd, but urges the country to "work peacefully, lawfully" to defeat racism and discrimination, and condemns those who have flouted social distancing rules to attend them during a time of "national trial".
- 15 June – Boris Johnson announces plans to create a cross-government commission to examine racial inequality and the disparities experienced by minority ethnic groups in education, health and the criminal justice system.
- 19 June
  - COVID-19 in the UK: The UK's COVID-19 alert level is reduced from four to three, meaning the virus remains in general circulation but transmission is no longer "high or rising exponentially."
  - The UK's national debt exceeds 100% of GDP for the first time since 1963.
- 23 June – COVID-19 pandemic in England: Prime Minister Boris Johnson announces an easing of the two-metre rule in England in favour of a "1-metre-plus" approach so two different households will be able to eat, drink or dine together from 4 July as long as they stick to physical-distancing guidelines. Households will also be able to visit each other which includes staying overnight.
- 25 June – Rebecca Long-Bailey is sacked from the Shadow Cabinet after sharing an article on Twitter that "contained an antisemitic conspiracy theory."
- 27 June – Kate Green is appointed by Keir Starmer as Shadow Secretary of State for Education, replacing Rebecca Long-Bailey.
- 30 June – The British government announces that rental e-scooters in the UK will be made legal from 4 July as an alternative which promotes social distancing compared to public mass transport, while privately owned e-scooters will remain illegal. This will be a rapid acceleration to a plan, first announced in March where scooters would be allowed in only four "future transport zones": Portsmouth and Southampton, the West of England Combined Authority (WECA), Derby and Nottingham, and the West Midlands.

=== July ===
- 1 July – Prime Minister Boris Johnson denounces China's imposition of a controversial national security law on Hong Kong as a violation of its treaty with the UK, and announces plans to extend the British National (Overseas) rights of up to 3,000,000 Hong Kong residents born under British rule and open a route for them to become British citizens.
- 4 July – COVID-19 pandemic in England: A major easing of the lockdown in England – subject to modified physical distancing conditions – allows the reopening of bingo halls, cinemas, galleries, hairdressers, hotels, pubs, restaurants and theme parks.
- 6 July
  - The government announces a £1.57bn support package to help British theatres, galleries, museums and other arts/cultural venues during the economic downturn.
  - The UK is warned by China not to interfere with its new Hong Kong national security law and to stop "making irresponsible remarks on Hong Kong affairs."
- 7 July – The British Government announces that it will resume arms sales to Saudi Arabia after a review finds "no clear risk" that they would be used in violation of international humanitarian law. Sales had been suspended in 2019 after a legal challenge by campaigners.
- 8 July – The Chancellor of the Exchequer, Rishi Sunak holds the July 2020 United Kingdom summer statement, also known as the Coronavirus mini-budget. It includes announcements that the Furlough scheme will be wound down gradually until finishing in October, the threshold for Stamp duty will be raised until 31 March 2021 and a ‘plans for jobs’ package worth £30 billion will be implemented, as well as the ‘Eat Out to Help Out’ scheme, VAT cuts for the hospitality sector and over £6 billion in Green investment.
- 10 July
  - COVID-19 pandemic in Scotland: Face coverings in shops and supermarkets become mandatory in Scotland.
  - Brexit: Plans are revealed for the emergency purchase of a 1.2m square foot "Mojo" site near Ashford, Kent, to be used for a new customs clearance centre for the 10,000 lorries crossing the English Channel to Calais every day.
- 11 July – COVID-19 pandemic in England: Further easing of the lockdown is introduced in England, as outdoor pools and water parks are allowed to reopen, while indoor gyms, pools and leisure centres can reopen from 25 July.
- 13 July – COVID-19 pandemic in England: The remainder of The Health Protection (Coronavirus, Restrictions) (No. 2) (England) Regulations 2020 comes into effect, allowing the re-opening of nail bars and salons, spas and beauty salons, massage parlours, tattoo parlours, and body and skin piercing services.
- 17 July – COVID-19 pandemic in England: Boris Johnson announces further easing of lockdown restrictions, with plans for a "significant return to normality" by Christmas. The new rules allow people to use public transport for non-essential journeys with immediate effect, while employers will have more discretion over their workplaces from 1 August. From 18 July, local authorities will have the power to enforce local lockdowns.
- 20 July
  - Foreign Secretary Dominic Raab announces that the government will suspend its extradition treaty with Hong Kong "immediately and indefinitely" over the controversial national security law.
  - MPs vote against New Clause 11, which intended to protect and maintain standards on animal health and welfare, food safety and the environment in the UK in any post-Brexit trade deal, by 337 votes to 251.
  - MPs vote against New Clause 17, which intended to protect the NHS and publicly funded health and care services in other parts of the UK from any form of control from outside the UK.
- 21 July – The Intelligence and Security Committee publishes a long-delayed Russia report on Russian influence over British politics. It shows that the government and intelligence agencies both failed to prepare or conduct any proper assessment of Kremlin attempts to interfere with the 2016 Brexit referendum.
- 24 July – COVID-19 pandemic in England: Face coverings in shops and supermarkets become mandatory in England.
- 25 July – Indoor gyms, swimming pools and sports facilities in England reopen in the latest easing of the lockdown.
- 27 July – The UK government announces a ban on junk food advertising before 21:00 for the whole UK, along with restrictions in England on how foods high in fat and sugar can be promoted in-store, and new rules for displaying calories on menus.
- 29 July – The government sign a deal with GSK and Sanofi to provide 60 million doses of their potential COVID-19 vaccine. This follows three previous deals with other companies, taking the UK's potential vaccine availability to 250 million doses.
- 30 July
  - COVID-19 in the UK: The isolation period for those with COVID-19 symptoms is extended from seven to 10 days, in line with guidance from the World Health Organization.
  - Former Conservative MP Charlie Elphicke is found guilty of sexually assaulting two women, in 2007 and 2016. His wife Natalie Elphicke, Member of Parliament for Dover, says the verdict has ended their marriage.
  - With a series of opinion polls showing majority support for Scottish independence, Jackson Carlaw resigns as Leader of the Scottish Conservative and Unionist Party after only six months in the job.
- 31 July – COVID-19 pandemic in England: A further easing of the lockdown in England, due to begin on 1 August, is postponed for at least two weeks, because of an increase in SARS-CoV-2 cases.

=== August ===
- 3 August – The Government's Eat Out to Help Out Scheme begins as previously announced by the Chancellor of the Exchequer, Rishi Sunak in the July 2020 United Kingdom summer statement, and runs from 3 August till 31 August.
- 5 August – Following the resignation on 30 July of Jackson Carlaw as leader of the Scottish Conservatives, he is succeeded by Douglas Ross MP.
- 11 August – Ruth Davidson is appointed Leader of the Scottish Conservatives in the Scottish Parliament by Douglas Ross, becoming the Leader of the Opposition again.
- 21 August – UK government debt is reported to be over £2 trillion for the first time. This also marks the first time the debt-to-GDP ratio has exceeded 100% since the 1960–61 financial year.
- 27 August – 2020 Liberal Democrats leadership election: Sir Ed Davey is selected as the next leader of the party, with 63.5% of votes, compared to 36.5% for Layla Moran.

=== September ===
- 4 September – Former Australian Prime Minister Tony Abbott is appointed as an unpaid trade adviser to the British government. The decision causes controversy over his past comments regarding women and LGBT people that have been labelled misogynistic and homophobic. A group of equality activists including Ian McKellen and Russell T Davies write an open letter against the appointment.
- 8 September
  - Sir Jonathan Jones, Head of the Government Legal Profession, resigns in protest against the government's reported plans to make changes to the Brexit withdrawal agreement, becoming the sixth senior civil servant to stand down in 2020.
  - Northern Ireland Secretary Brandon Lewis states the then unpublished Internal Market Bill could "break international law" in a "very specific and limited way".
- 9 September
  - 2020 Green Party of England and Wales leadership election: Siân Berry and Jonathan Bartley are re-elected as co-leaders of the Green Party.
  - The Internal Market Bill is presented to Parliament by the Government.
- 14 September
  - COVID-19 in the UK: The new "rule of six" law comes into force. In England, unless one of the exceptions applies, such as team sports, sailing, angling, shooting, polo, dodgeball, floorball and goalball, the law provides authority to limit the number of persons in a gathering to a maximum of six. Equivalent rules also begin in Wales and Scotland, with some differences including exemptions for children under the ages of 11 and 12 respectively.
  - Conservative MP Rehman Chishti resigns as Prime Minister's Special Envoy for Freedom of Religion or Belief over the Government's Internal Market Bill, saying it unilaterally breaks the UK's legal commitments.
  - The Internal Market Bill clears its first hurdle in the Commons by 340 votes to 263.
- 15 September – Former Conservative MP Charlie Elphicke is jailed for two years for sexually assaulting two women, in 2007 and 2016.
- 18 September – COVID-19 in the UK: Prime Minister Boris Johnson states the UK is "now seeing a second wave" of COVID-19, with the R number now at 1.1 to 1.4 and cases rising around the country among all age groups.
- 22 September – COVID-19 in the UK: Michael Gove recommends that employees should work from home if able to do so.
- 23 September
  - The UK government scraps plans for an Autumn budget because of the COVID-19 pandemic.
  - Chancellor Rishi Sunak announces he will make a statement to the House of Commons the following day on what happens after the furlough scheme finishes after the UK government comes under mounting pressure from opposition politicians to decide on a replacement.
- 24 September
  - New regulations (SI 1029) come into force, in part, at 5 am in England, prohibiting certain ′restricted businesses′ and ′restricted services′ from carrying on that business or providing that service between the hours of 22:00 and 05:00. The regulations affect a wide range of establishments, including restaurants, bars, public houses, social clubs, casinos, bingo halls, bowling alleys, cinemas, theatres, concert halls, amusement arcades, funfairs (indoors or outdoors), theme parks and adventure parks. The protected area of Bolton is excluded from the scope of this legislation as additional restrictions apply.
  - In a statement to the House of Commons, Chancellor Rishi Sunak announces the Job Support Scheme as a replacement to the furlough scheme, beginning on 1 November. Under the scheme, people who work reduced hours will receive government help to top up their wages to two-thirds of their full pay. The Chancellor also announces extension (at a reduced level) of help for self-employed people, longer repayment periods for business loans, and an extension to the temporary reduction in VAT for hospitality and tourism companies.
- 28 September
  - The remainder of regulations (SI 1029) come into force in England, reducing the maximum number who can attend weddings and civil partnership ceremonies and any associated receptions from 30 to 15.
  - The Houses of Parliament announces it will stop serving alcohol on its premises after 10pm, despite not being subject to England's COVID-19 laws.
  - Newcomer MP Claudia Webbe is suspended from the Labour Party after being charged with harassment.
- 29 September – MPs give their final backing to the Internal Market Bill, by 340 votes to 256. It now moves to the House of Lords.

=== October ===
- 1 October
  - After the British government ignored its early September demands to scrap parts of the Internal Market Bill by the end of the month, the European Commission launches legal action against the UK in response to the bill, which could be used to override sections of the Brexit divorce deal.
  - Margaret Ferrier, MP for Rutherglen and Hamilton West is suspended from the British parliamentary Scottish National Party after travelling from London to Scotland after being confirmed positive for COVID-19.
- 2 October
  - Cumbria County Council approves the first new deep coalmine for 30 years, voting 12–3 in favour. Opponents, which include Extinction Rebellion, argue that it contradicts the UK's pledge to be carbon neutral by 2050.
  - Plans for 40 new hospitals by 2030 are confirmed as part of a package worth £3.7 billion, with a further eight planned.
- 9 October – COVID-19 in the UK: Chancellor Rishi Sunak announces that workers will get two-thirds of their wages paid for by the government if their employer is forced to shut because of the British government response to the COVID-19 pandemic.
- 12 October – COVID-19 pandemic in England: Boris Johnson tells the Commons there will be a new three-tier alert system for local authorities in England – medium (tier 1), high (tier 2), and very high (tier 3).
- 16 October – Brexit: Boris Johnson contends that trade talks with the EU are effectively "over", and that the UK should "get ready" for arrangements with the EU to be "more like Australia's" from 1 January 2021.
- 20 October – The House of Lords rejects the Internal Market Bill, voting by 395 to 169 (a majority of 226) for a "regret" amendment.
- 23 October – COVID-19 pandemic in Scotland: Nicola Sturgeon confirms that Scotland is to enter a new five-level system of social distancing restrictions.
- 29 October –
  - COVID-19 pandemic in England: In a televised address, PM Boris Johnson announces a new four-week lockdown for England, to be enforced from 5 November until 2 December.
  - Jeremy Corbyn is suspended from the Labour Party.

=== November ===
- 5 November
  - COVID-19 pandemic in England: A second lockdown is introduced in England in attempt to curb rising COVID-19 cases. The lockdown is scheduled to last four weeks.
  - COVID-19 in the UK: Chancellor of the Exchequer Rishi Sunak extends the government's furlough scheme to the end of March 2021.
- 7 November
  - COVID-19 in the UK: The Scottish Government and the British Government impose a ban on non-British citizens arriving from Denmark after a new SARS-CoV-2 variant, Cluster 5, being spread from mink to humans in mink farms.
  - Boris Johnson congratulates Joe Biden on being elected President of the United States, saying: "The US is our most important ally and I look forward to working closely together on our shared priorities, from climate change to trade and security."
- 9 November – The House of Lords votes by 433 to 165 to remove a section of the Internal Market Bill which allowed the government to break international law.
- 13 November – Lee Cain, director of communications at Downing Street, announces his intention to stand down at the end of the year after reports of infighting in Number 10. Dominic Cummings, Boris Johnson's chief adviser and long-time "ally" to Cain, resigns shortly after.
- 14 November – The government commissions research into space-based solar power.
- 15 November – COVID-19 in the UK: Boris Johnson is told to self-isolate by NHS Test and Trace after meeting MP Lee Anderson, who later tested positive for COVID-19. Downing Street says that the PM does not show any symptoms and will continue working from Number 10 whilst self-isolating.
- 17 November – Jeremy Corbyn is readmitted to the Labour Party.
- 19 November
  - The government announces an extra £16.5 billion in defence spending over the next four years to "extend British influence".
  - Sources familiar with the Cabinet Office report that an inquiry into allegations of bullying by Home Secretary Priti Patel concluded that she broke the Ministerial Code.
- 20 November
  - Sir Alex Allan resigns as the Prime Minister's adviser on the Ministerial Code, after Johnson rejects his findings and expresses "full confidence" in Priti Patel.
  - COVID-19 in the UK: Matt Hancock announces that vaccination centres are being established across the UK in preparation for a SARS-CoV-2 vaccine that, if approved, could begin distribution in December.
- 21 November – A Whitehall source reports that Sir Alex Allan had resisted pressure from Boris Johnson to make his findings from the inquiry into Priti Patel more "palatable".
- 23 November – COVID-19 pandemic in England: Boris Johnson confirms that the lockdown in England will end on 2 December, with "tougher" three-tiered regional measures being introduced until March 2021.
- 24 November – COVID-19 in the UK: The leaders of the three devolved nations of the UK agree with the prime minister on plans that will permit up to three households to form a "Christmas bubble" during a five-day period from 23 to 27 December, allowing them to mix in homes, places of worship, and outdoor spaces.
- 25 November –
  - Rishi Sunak says that the "economic emergency" caused by COVID-19 has "only just begun" during his Spending Review announcement to the House of Commons, as figures from the Office for Budget Responsibility show that the economy is forecast to shrink by 11.3% in 2020, the UK's biggest economic decline in 300 years.
  - Baroness Sugg resigns from the Foreign Office, saying it is "fundamentally wrong" to cut the UK overseas aid budget.
- 26 November – Boris Johnson appoints Dan Rosenfield as his new Downing Street Chief of Staff, effective from 1 January 2021.

=== December ===
- 1 December – COVID-19 pandemic in England: MPs vote 291–78 in favour of introducing England's new COVID-19 tier system with The Health Protection (Coronavirus, Restrictions) (All Tiers) (England) Regulations 2020, with 55 backbench Conservatives voting against the government, while another 16 abstain.
- 4 December – Mayor of Liverpool Joe Anderson is arrested, along with four others, on suspicion of conspiracy to commit bribery and witness intimidation, related to the awarding of building contracts in the city.
- 7 December – MPs vote by 357 to 268, a majority of 89, to reinstate controversial sections of the Internal Market Bill linked to the Northern Ireland protocol, which the EU continues to oppose.
- 14 December – COVID-19 in the UK: Health Secretary Matt Hancock tells MPs that a new variant of COVID-19, Variant of Concern 202012/01 – later dubbed the Alpha variant – has been identified that is spreading faster in some areas of the country. The variant shows changes to the spike protein which could make the virus more infectious.
- 17 December – The Chancellor of the Exchequer, Rishi Sunak, announces that the furlough and loan schemes have been extended until the end of April 2021.
- 18 December –
  - COVID-19 in the UK: The New and Emerging Respiratory Virus Threats Advisory Group and the government are informed of evidence of increased transmissibility of the SARS-CoV-2 Alpha variant (Variant of Concern 202012/01).
  - Joe FitzPatrick is sacked as Scottish Minister for Public Health, Sport and Wellbeing after drug-related deaths in Scotland rose for a sixth year.
- 18 December – Conservative MP Andrew Lewer is sacked as a ministerial aide.
- 19 December – The Government reverses the decision to loosen COVID-19 indoor mixing restrictions over Christmas, reducing it to only Christmas Day for England, Scotland and Wales. It also announces a new Tier 4 restriction level for areas in London and the South East already in Tier 3. Those in the new Tier 4 restriction are not able to mix over Christmas at all.
- 20 December – Many EU countries including France close their borders to the United Kingdom due to the new strain of COVID-19 spreading rapidly in London and the South East of England. The Port of Dover halts all exports to France due to this.
- 23 December –
  - France reopens its borders to the United Kingdom, providing those who come through the border have a negative COVID-19 test.
  - COVID-19 pandemic in England: Tier 4 restrictions are announced for more areas in England from Boxing Day.
- 24 December – Brexit: The UK and the European Union agree to a free trade agreement prior to the end of the transition period.
- 30 December – Brexit: The post-Brexit trade agreement with the EU is passed in the House of Commons by 521 votes to 73, a majority of 448.
- 31 December – Brexit: The transition period expires at 23:00 GMT as the UK completes its final separation from the EU, four and a half years after the referendum.

== History by issue ==
Note: this section is for describing issues in narrative format if desired.

=== Brexit ===
In January 2020, The United Kingdom and Gibraltar left the European Union, beginning an 11-month transition period, during which they remain in the Single Market and Customs Union.

=== Climate change ===
In December 2019, the World Meteorological Organization released its annual climate report revealing that climate impacts are worsening. They found the global sea temperatures are rising as well as land temperatures worldwide. 2019 is the last year in a decade that is the warmest on record.

Global carbon emissions hit a record high in 2019, even though the rate of increase slowed somewhat, according to a report from Global Carbon Project.

== See also ==
- General politics timelines by year
  - 2020 in politics and government
- Other UK timelines by year
  - 2020 in the United Kingdom
- Decade articles
  - 2010s in political history
  - 2010s in United Kingdom political history
- Other country timelines
  - 2020 in United States politics and government
- Draft articles:
  - 2020s in United Kingdom political history

=== Specific situations and issues ===
- Brexit negotiations
- Brexit negotiations in 2019
- Premiership of Boris Johnson
