= Chancellorship of Rishi Sunak =

Rishi Sunak's tenure at HM Treasury (2020–2022)

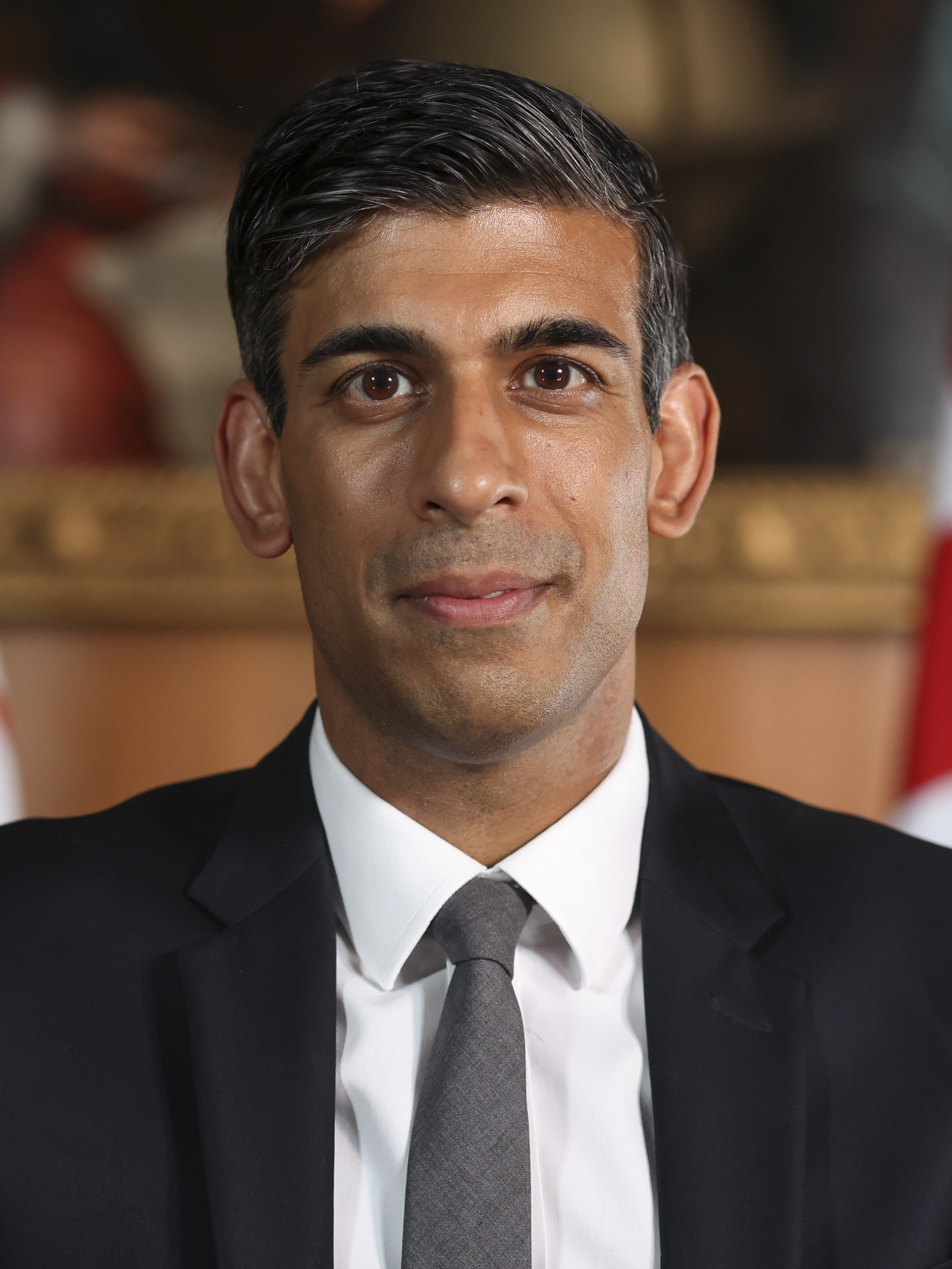
- Official portrait, 2021
- Chancellorship of Rishi Sunak; 13 February 2020 – 5 July 2022
- Chancellor: Rishi Sunak
- Party: Conservative
- Nominated by: Boris Johnson
- Appointed by: Elizabeth II
- Seat: 11 Downing Street

Rishi Sunak served as Chancellor of the Exchequer of the United Kingdom from his appointment on 13 February 2020 to his resignation on 5 July 2022. His tenure was dominated by the COVID-19 pandemic in the United Kingdom, with Sunak becoming a prominent figure in the government's response to the pandemic, giving economic support to struggling businesses through various schemes. He was also involved in the government's response to the cost of living crisis, UK energy supply crisis, and global energy crisis.

Sunak was appointed chancellor by prime minister Boris Johnson in the 2020 cabinet reshuffle, succeeding Sajid Javid, who had resigned as chancellor after refusing a demand from Johnson and his chief adviser Dominic Cummings that he dismiss his advisers. Sunak was prominent in the government's financial response to the COVID-19 pandemic and its economic impact, including the Coronavirus Job Retention furlough scheme for employees, and the Eat Out to Help Out scheme, although the latter of which contributed to a rise in COVID-19 infections. Controversies regarding COVID-19 contracts occurred during Sunak's chancellorship. In the Partygate scandal it was found that multiple parties had been held at 10 Downing Street during national COVID-19 lockdowns, and COVID-19 social distancing laws were breached by 83 individuals, including Sunak, who in April 2022 was issued with a fixed penalty notice.

In May 2022, as the rising cost of living became an increasingly serious and worrying issue for the country, Sunak intensified the government's efforts to respond to the crisis, with a £5 billion windfall tax on energy companies to help fund a £15 billion support package for the public. Following the Chris Pincher scandal, Sunak resigned as chancellor on 5 July 2022, almost simultaneously with Javid's resignation as health secretary, and was the second of 62 Conservative MPs to resign during the government crisis which culminated in Johnson's own resignation. He was succeeded by Nadhim Zahawi. Three months after the end of his chancellorship, Sunak became prime minister following the resignation of Liz Truss in October 2022 amid another government crisis, having spent the duration of Truss's premiership on the backbenches.

== Appointment ==
=== Background ===
Rishi Sunak was appointed Chief Secretary to the Treasury by Prime Minister Boris Johnson on 24 July 2019, and Sajid Javid was appointed Chancellor of the Exchequer. Tensions between 10 Downing Street and the Treasury had come to a head in August 2019, when Johnson's Chief Special Adviser Dominic Cummings dismissed one of Javid's aides, Sonia Khan, without Javid's permission and without informing him. It was alleged that, during her dismissal, Cummings "went outside No 10 and asked an armed officer to enter the building and escort Khan off the premises." In November 2019, following questions of a rift between the two men, Johnson gave his assurance that he would retain Javid as chancellor after the 2019 general election. After the Conservative Party's landslide victory at the 2019 general election, Javid remained as chancellor and Sunak remained as Chief Secretary to the Treasury.

=== Appointment as Chancellor ===
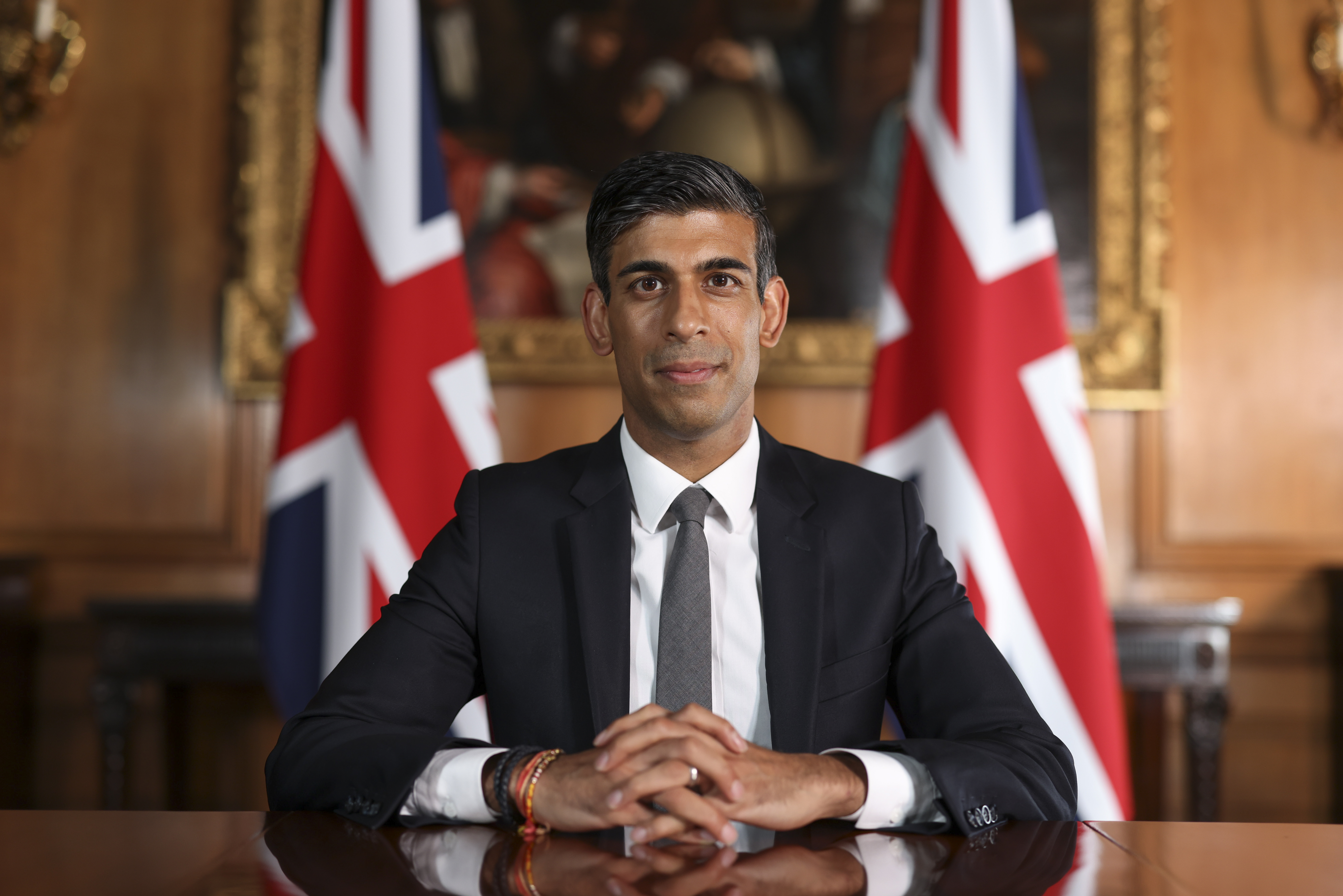
Sunak's official cabinet portrait, September 2021

In the weeks leading up to Johnson's first cabinet reshuffle in February 2020, a number of briefings in the press had suggested that a new economic ministry led by Sunak might be established, to reduce the power and political influence of the Treasury. Sunak was considered to be a Johnson loyalist, seen as the "rising star" minister who had ably represented Johnson during the 2019 general election debates. By February 2020, it was reported that Javid would remain in his role as Chancellor and that Sunak would stay on as Chief Secretary to the Treasury, in order to "keep an eye" on Javid.

On 13 February 2020, the day of the reshuffle, Javid resigned as Chancellor of the Exchequer, following a meeting with Johnson. During the meeting, Johnson had offered to allow Javid to keep his position on the condition that he dismiss all his advisers at the Treasury and replace them with ones selected by 10 Downing Street. Upon resigning, Javid told the Press Association that "no self-respecting minister would accept those terms". Javid's resignation had been unexpected, given Johnson's commitment to keep him in the Cabinet and recent reports that a rival finance ministry would not be created.

Sunak was promoted to chancellor to replace Javid as part of Johnson's first cabinet reshuffle later that day. Some political commentators saw Sunak's appointment as signalling the end of the Treasury's independence from Downing Street, which began during Gordon Brown's chancellorship under Tony Blair, with Robert Shrimsley, chief political commentator of the Financial Times, arguing that "good government often depends on senior ministers – and the Chancellor in particular – being able to fight bad ideas".

== Major acts as Chancellor ==
=== COVID-19 pandemic ===
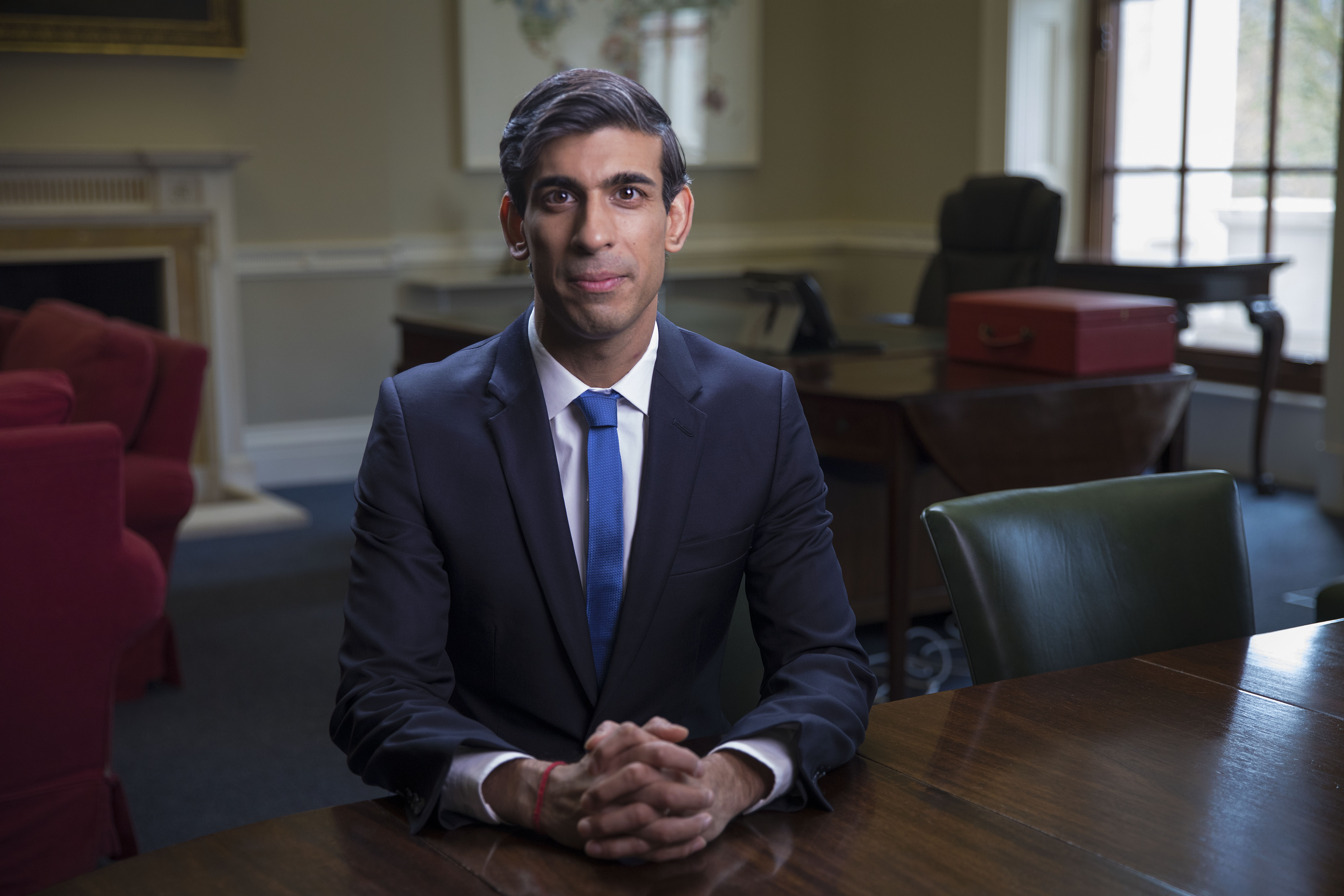
Sunak records a public information film explaining where businesses and employees can find information about government support during the COVID-19 pandemic, 4 April 2020

In response to the first confirmed COVID-19 cases in January 2020, Sunak and the government introduced advice for travellers coming from affected countries in late January and February 2020, and began contact tracing, although this was later abandoned. The government incrementally introduced further societal restrictions on the public as the virus spread across the country in the following weeks, initially resisting more stringent measures introduced elsewhere in Europe and Asia. On 23 March 2020, as COVID-19 had become a pandemic and began rapidly spreading across the country, Johnson announced the first national lockdown and Parliament introduced the Coronavirus Act 2020, which granted the devolved governments emergency powers and empowered the police to enforce public health measures. Sunak was part of a committee of Cabinet ministers that made decisions on the pandemic.

On 20 March 2020, Sunak gave a statement on COVID-19, saying:

Now, more than any time in our history, we will be judged by our capacity for compassion. Our ability to come through this, won’t just be down to what government or businesses do, but by the individual acts of kindness that we show each other. The small business who does everything they can not to lay off their staff. The student who does a shop for their elderly neighbour. The retired nurse who volunteers to cover some shifts in their local hospital. When this is over, and it will be over, we want to look back on this moment and remember the many small acts of kindness done by us and to us. We want to look back on this time and remember how we thought first of others and acted with decency. We want to look back on this time and remember how, in the face of a generation-defining moment, we undertook a collective national effort - and we stood together. It’s on all of us.

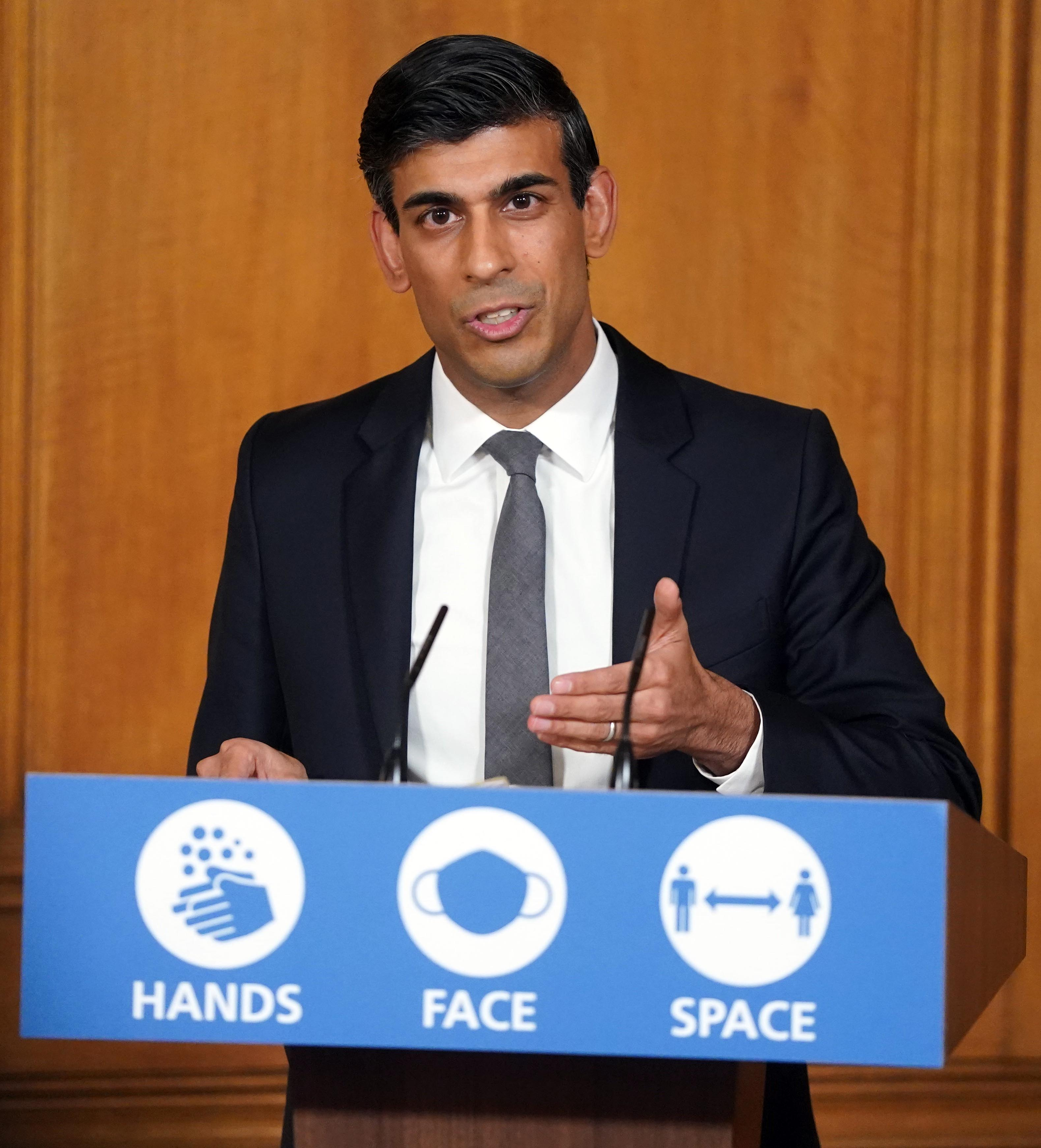
Sunak at a press conference on COVID-19 on 12 October 2020

As the governments began lifting the nationwide stay-at-home order, policies and approaches diverged between the four nations. The Scottish government uniquely pursued an elimination strategy. Across the country, localised lockdowns, social distancing measures, self-isolation laws for those exposed to the virus and rules on face masks were introduced, as well as efforts to expand COVID-19 testing and tracing. In autumn and winter 2020, further nationwide lockdowns were introduced in response to a surge in COVID-19 cases and the Alpha variant. A COVID-19 vaccination programme began in December 2020. In mid-2021, the government lifted most restrictions during the third wave driven by the Delta variant, until the "winter plan" reintroduced some rules in response to the Omicron variant in December that year. Remaining restrictions were lifted in England from 24 February 2022 under a "living with COVID" plan announced by the government on that date. Economic support was provided to struggling businesses and to furlough employees to mitigate the severe economic impact. It also forwent the procurement process in contracts in response to shortages of PPE and medical equipment, major issues in the early months of the outbreak, and for developing a contact tracing app.

As the pandemic generated financial consequences, Sunak's measures as chancellor received criticism as some workers were unable to qualify for the Treasury's income support measures. The Institute for Employment Studies estimated that 100,000 people could not be eligible for any type of government help as they started a new job too late to be included on the job retention scheme, while the British Hospitality Association informed the Treasury Select Committee that between 350,000 and 500,000 workers in its sector were not eligible. On 26 September 2020, Sunak was said to have opposed a second lockdown with the threat of his resignation, due to what he saw as the dire economic consequences it would have and the responsibility he would have to suffer for that. The UK government's response to the pandemic, in particular the timeliness of public health measures being introduced and lifted, has faced criticism from academic medical sources, media outlets, relatives of COVID-19 patients and various political figures. A public inquiry into the response began in 2022.

Sunak said he had opposed recommendations by government medical advisers for a second "circuit-breaker" lockdown in September 2020 due to the potential impact on jobs and the economy. Then–health secretary Matt Hancock said that Sunak had put Johnson under "enormous pressure" not to introduce further restrictions during this time although Sunak maintained he had only advised the Prime Minister on economic matters in order to help him reach a decision. According to the diary of Vallance, he was told by Dominic Cummings, Johnson's chief political adviser, that Sunak had argued to "just let people die" during an argument over imposing a second lockdown in October 2020. Sunak denied the "let people die" claim, pointing to the fact that Vallance did not hear the phrase but merely claimed to have been told about it by Cummings.

==== COVID-19 schemes ====
===== Coronavirus Job Retention Scheme =====
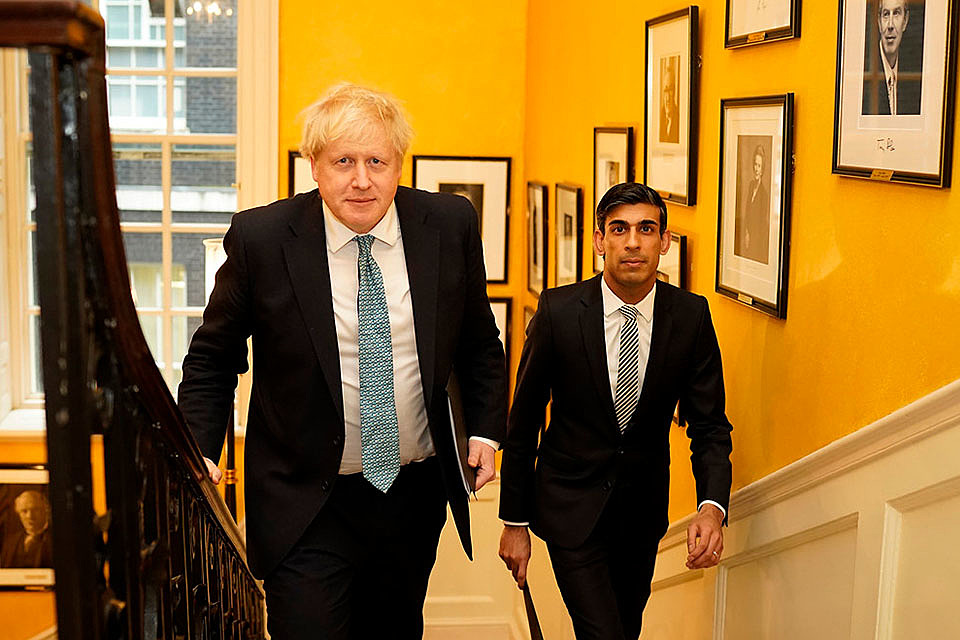
Sunak and Prime Minister Boris Johnson in 10 Downing Street, March 2020

On 17 March 2020, Sunak introduced a programme providing £330 billion in emergency support for businesses, as well as a furlough scheme for employees. This was the first time a British government had created such an employee retention scheme. The scheme was introduced on 20 March 2020 as providing grants to employers to pay 80% of a staff wage and employment costs each month, up to a total of £2,500 per person per month. The cost has been estimated at £14 billion a month to run. The Coronavirus Job Retention Scheme initially ran for three months and was backdated to 1 March. Following a three-week extension of the countrywide lockdown the scheme was extended by Sunak until the end of June 2020. At the end of May, Sunak extended the scheme until the end of October 2020. The decision to extend the job retention scheme was made to avoid or defer mass redundancies, company bankruptcies and potential unemployment levels not seen since the 1930s. After a second lockdown in England on 31 October 2020, the programme was further extended until 2 December 2020, this was followed on 5 November 2020 by a lengthy extension until 31 March 2021. On 17 December 2020, the programme was further extended until 30 April 2021. In the 2021 budget held on 3 March 2021, Sunak confirmed that the scheme had been extended once more until 30 September 2021.

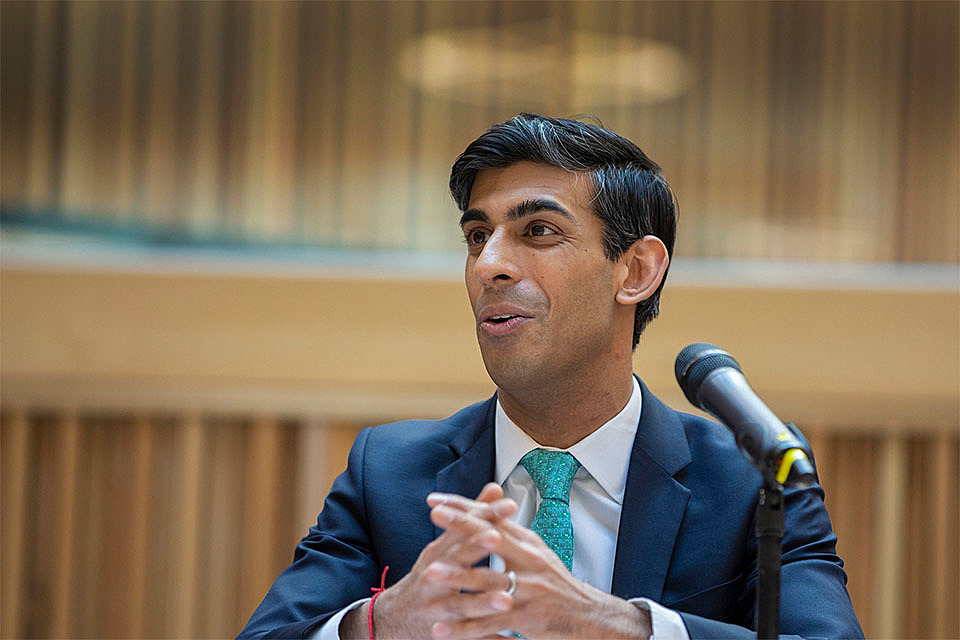
Sunak announcing a new scheme for larger companies in April 2020

Following changes to the scheme at the end of May, the director of the Northern Ireland Retail Consortium said that being asked to pay wages when businesses had not been trading was an added pressure, while the Federation of Small Businesses was surprised that the Chancellor was tapering the scheme when ending it. Northern Ireland's economy minister Diane Dodds said that changes to the scheme could be very difficult for some sectors uncertain about when they can reopen, particularly in the hospitality and retail sector, whilst finance minister Conor Murphy said that it was too early in the economic recovery. By 15 August 80,433 firms had returned £215,756,121 that had been claimed under the scheme. Other companies had claimed smaller amounts of grant cash on the next instalment to compensate for any overpayment. HM Revenue and Customs officials believed that £3.5 billion may have been paid out in error or to fraudsters.

===== Eat Out to Help Out =====
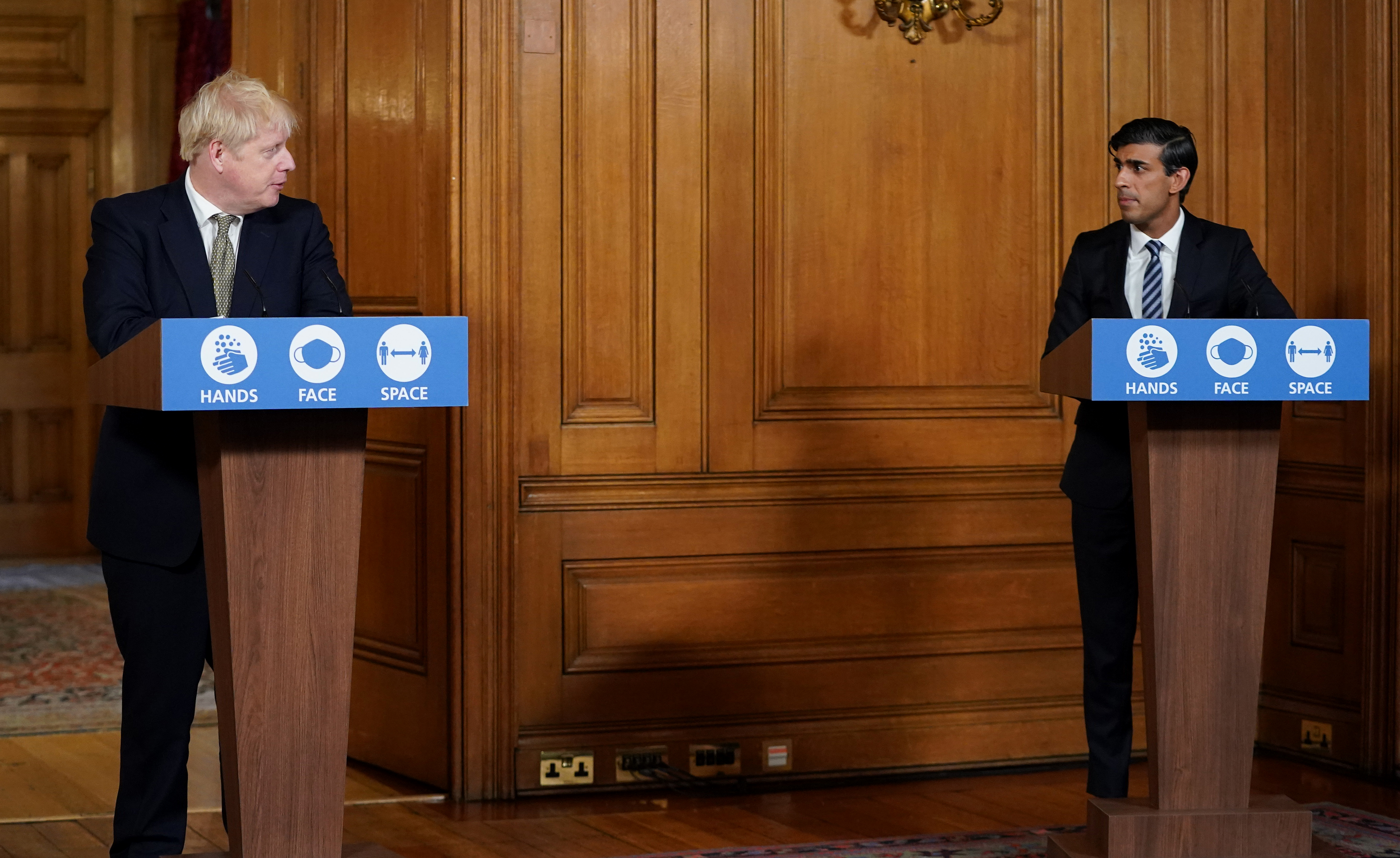
Sunak and Johnson at a COVID-19 press conference in October 2020

In July, Sunak unveiled a plan for a further £30 billion of spending which included a stamp duty holiday, a cut to value-added tax (VAT) for the hospitality sector, a job retention bonus for employers and the Eat Out to Help Out scheme, aimed at supporting and creating jobs in the hospitality industry. The government subsidised food and soft drinks at participating cafes, pubs and restaurants at 50%, up to £10 per person. The offer was available from 3 to 31 August on Monday to Wednesday each week. In total, the scheme subsidised £849 million in meals.

Sunak announced the scheme on 8 July 2020 as part of the British government's Plan for Jobs strategy. It involved the government subsidising food and non-alcoholic drinks at participating cafes, pubs, and restaurants at 50%, up to £10 per person (per order). The offer, announced in July 2020, was available during the month of August 2020, from Monday to Wednesday each week. In total, the scheme subsidised £849 million across 160 million subsidised meals. Some consider the scheme to be a success in boosting the hospitality industry, while others disagree.

Further lockdowns were introduced later in 2020 after the scheme ended in response to an increase in COVID-19 infections, which forced many hospitality venues to close once again. A 2020 study found that the scheme contributed to a rise in COVID-19 infection, which Johnson acknowledged but the Treasury rejected. A 2021 study found that the scheme contributed to a rise in COVID-19 infections, with Johnson acknowledged but Sunak rejected.

It was later alleged by the government's chief medical adviser Sir Patrick Vallance during the UK COVID-19 Inquiry that Sunak had not informed medical advisers of the scheme until it was announced, whereas written evidence from Sunak claimed that the scheme had been discussed with medical advisers, including Vallance, and they had not objected.

==== Fraud against the COVID schemes ====
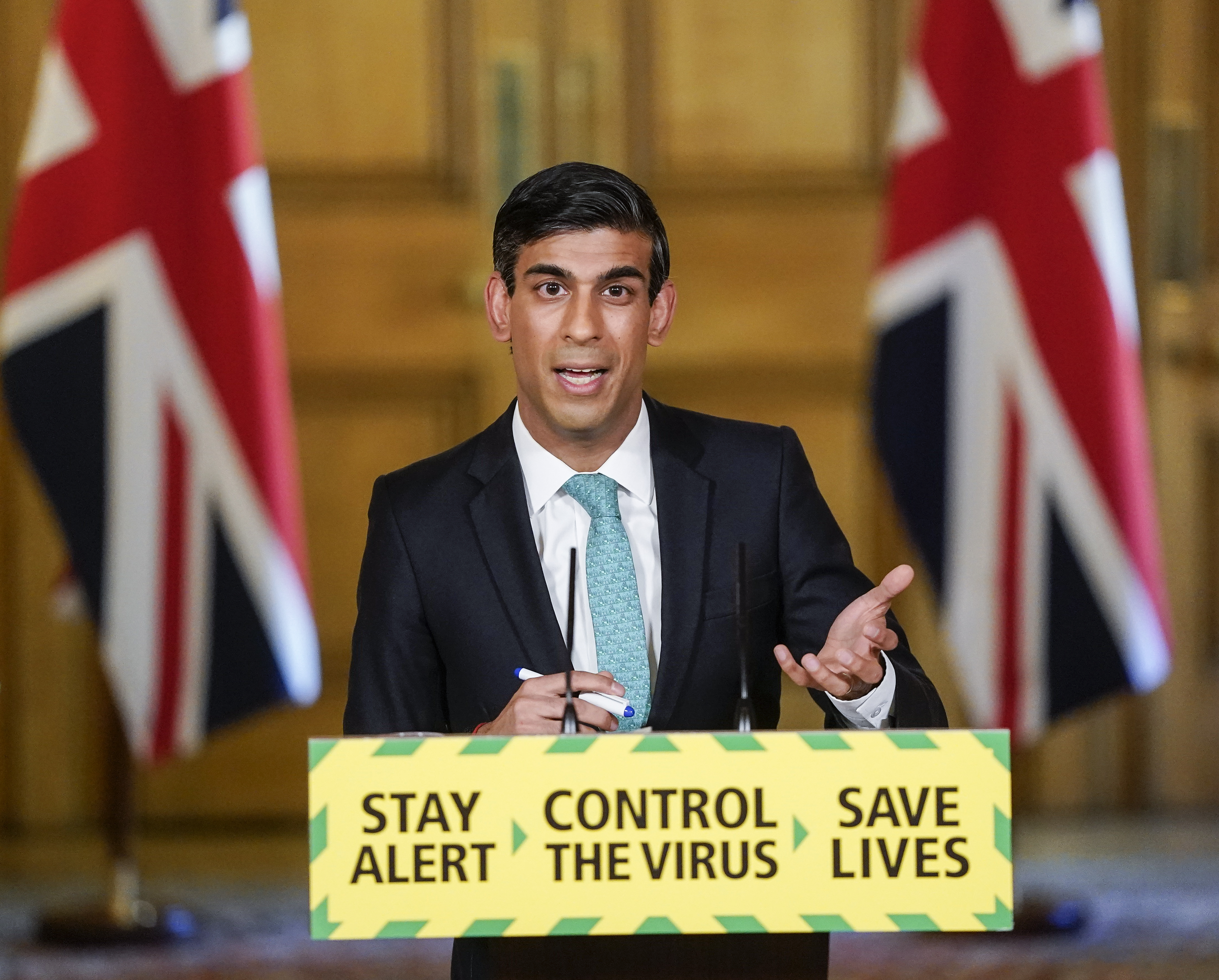
Sunak at a COVID-19 press conference in June 2020

In June 2020, David Clarke, chair of the Fraud Advisory Panel charity and a group of top white-collar crime experts wrote a letter to Sunak, the National Audit Office, and others, to alert them the risk of fraud against the government tax-payer backed stimulus schemes. They called for publication of the names of companies receiving Bounce Back Loans to enable data matching to prevent, deter and detect fraud. In September 2020, it emerged that Government Ministers were warned about the risk of fraud against the financial support schemes by Keith Morgan, CEO of the state-owned British Business Bank who had concerns about the Bounce Back Loan Scheme and Future Fund. In December 2020, it was reported that banks and the National Crime Agency also had concerns about fraudulent abuse of the Bounce Back Loan Scheme.

In January 2021, the NCA reported that three city workers who worked for the same London financial institution had been arrested as part of an investigation into fraudulent Bounce Back Loans totalling £6 million. The NCA said the men were suspected of using their "specialist knowledge" to carry out the fraud. This form of insider fraud was a risk highlighted in the letter sent to Sunak in June 2020. A 2022 Freedom of Information request to the British Business Bank, the state-run body administering the bounce back loan scheme, found that almost one fifth, or 193,000 businesses had failed to meet their repayment terms as at 27 June 2022. The UK government estimated that £4.9 billion of bounce back loans may have been lost to fraud.

In November 2022, a month after Sunak had ascended to the premiership, it was revealed that four billion pounds had been lost to fraud in Sunak's three COVID schemes, with Eat Out to Help Out being revealed as having "a particularly high level of fraud". Arrests were made as part of efforts to clamp down on fraud.

==== Controversies regarding COVID-19 contracts ====
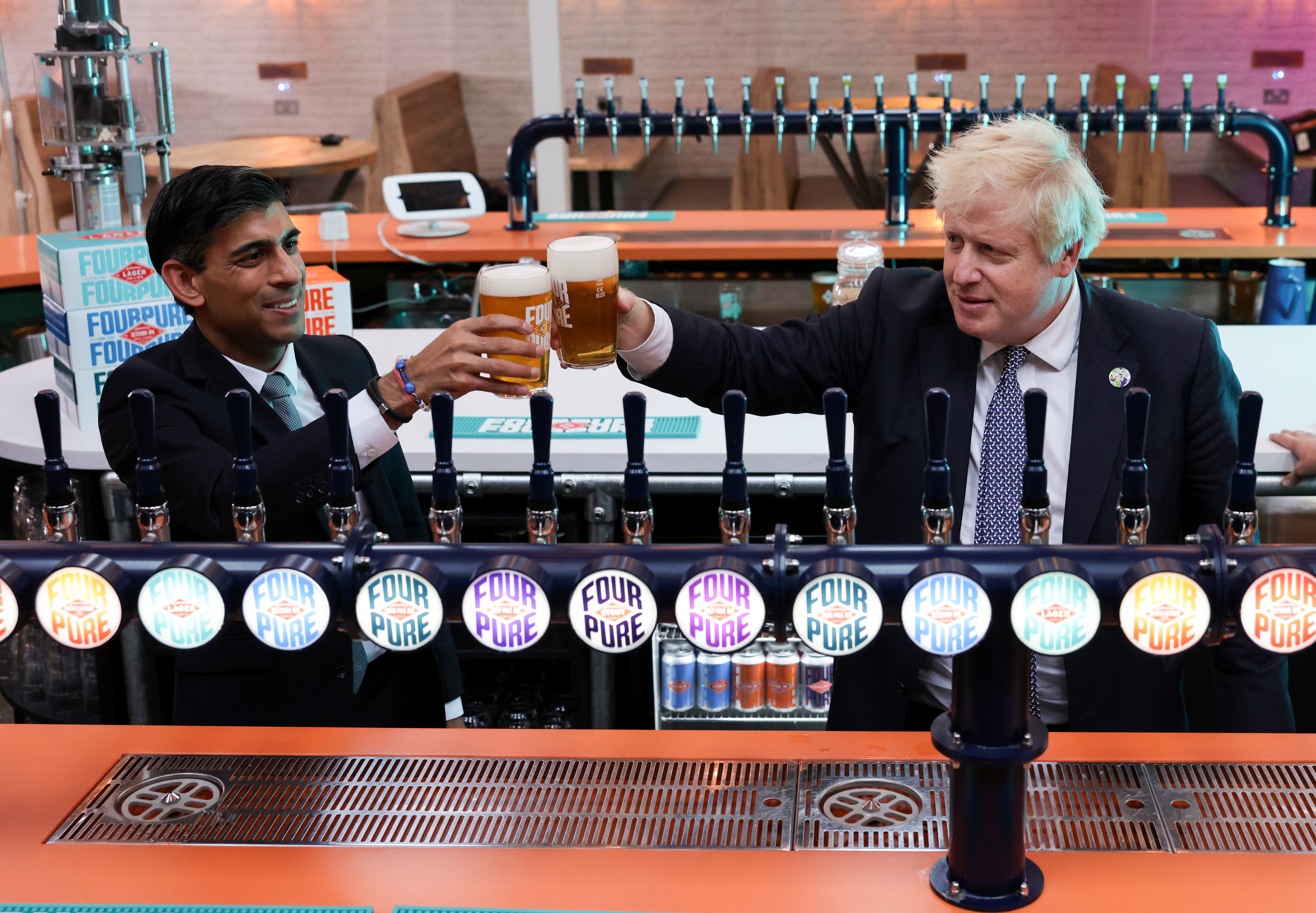
Sunak and Johnson at Fourpure Brewery in South East London in October 2021

In response to the COVID-19 pandemic, Sunak and the government decided in March 2020 to rapidly place contracts and recruit a number of individuals. Shortages of personal protective equipment (PPE) were a particular political issue for the government. This led to the awarding of a number of contracts without a competitive tendering process, and friends of political figures and people who had made political donations, most notably Michelle Mone, were quickly given contracts. As a result, accusations of cronyism were made against the government.

==== Fixed penalty notice ====
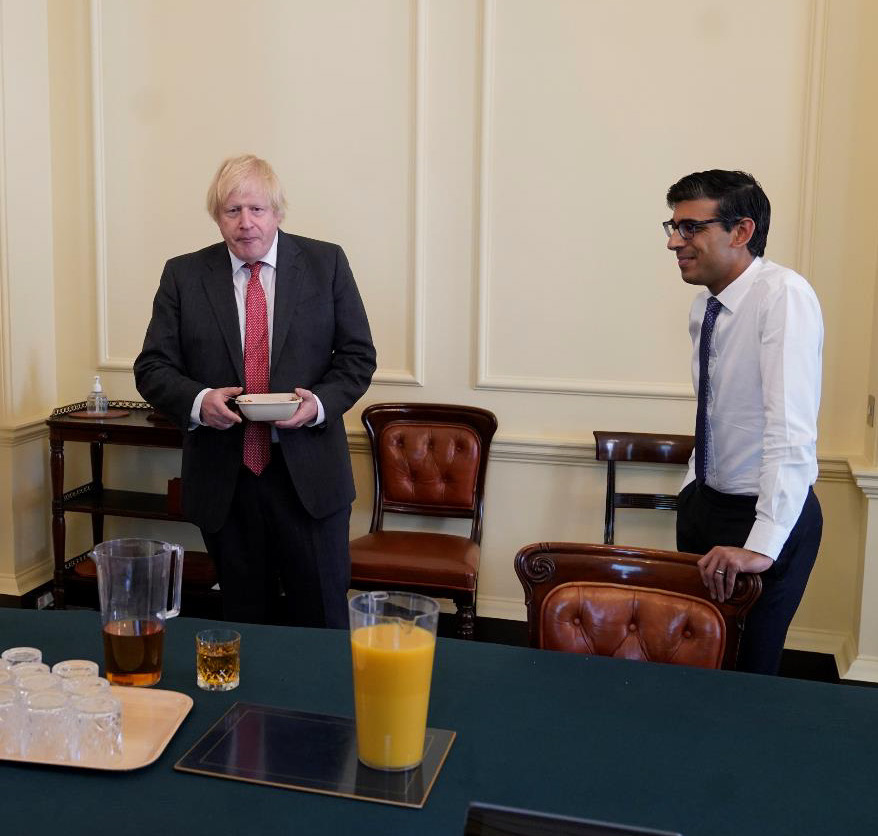
Johnson and Sunak at the former's birthday celebration on 19 June 2020; both men later received fixed penalty notices for attending the gathering

In April 2022, amid the Partygate scandal, Sunak was issued a fixed penalty notice by the police who found he had committed offences under COVID-19 regulations by attending a birthday party for Johnson on 19 June 2020. The police also issued 125 fixed penalty notices to 82 other individuals, including Johnson and his wife Carrie Symonds, who all apologised and paid the penalties. Sunak said he was "extremely and sincerely sorry" for the hurt caused by him attending the party, and that he respected the police's decision to give him a fine. ITV News later reported that some of Sunak's junior aides at the time suggested he should resign in order to challenge Johnson's leadership, but he chose not to. The Telegraph reported that Sunak did plan to resign, but was persuaded not to by newspaper executives. In an interview with BBC Political Editor Chris Mason in May 2022, Sunak defended Johnson amid the backlash, claiming that Johnson "apologised profusely and sincerely", had "acted on it and learned the lessons", and was "even more committed" to "deliver for the British people". Sunak said Johnson had "his full support" and that he always trusted and believed Johnson.

=== Cost of living crisis ===
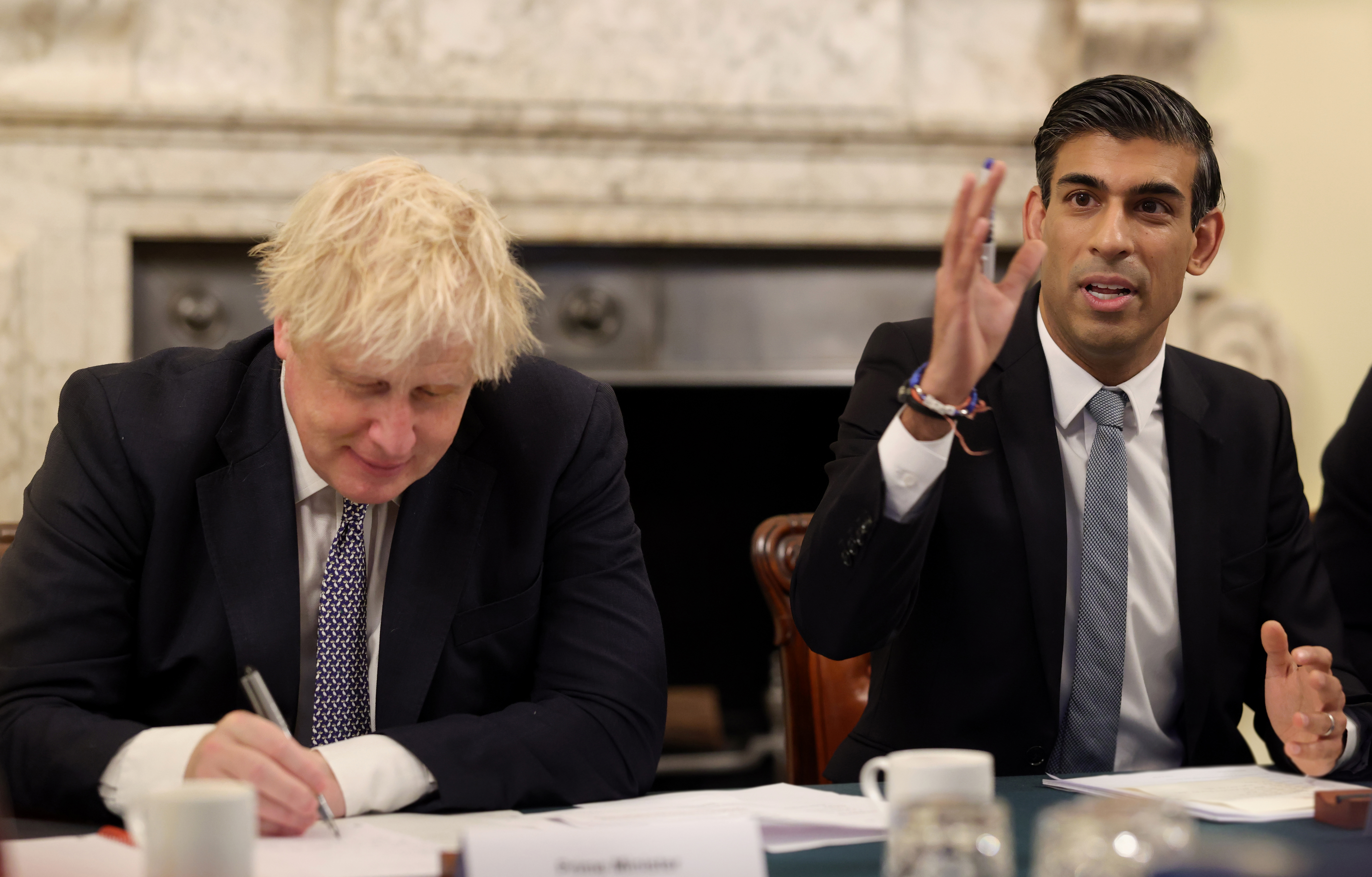
Sunak at a cabinet meeting with Johnson, October 2021

As the rising cost of living became an increasingly serious and worrying issue for the country, Sunak intensified the government's efforts to respond to the crisis in May 2022, with a £5 billion windfall tax on energy companies to help fund a £15 billion support package for the public. The package included every household getting a £400 discount on energy bills, which would be in addition to a £150 council tax refund the government had already ordered. For about 8 million of the UK's lowest income households, a further £650 payment was announced. Additionally, pensioners or those with disability would qualify for extra payments, on top of the £550 that every household gets, and the £650 they would receive if they had a low income.

== Other actions ==
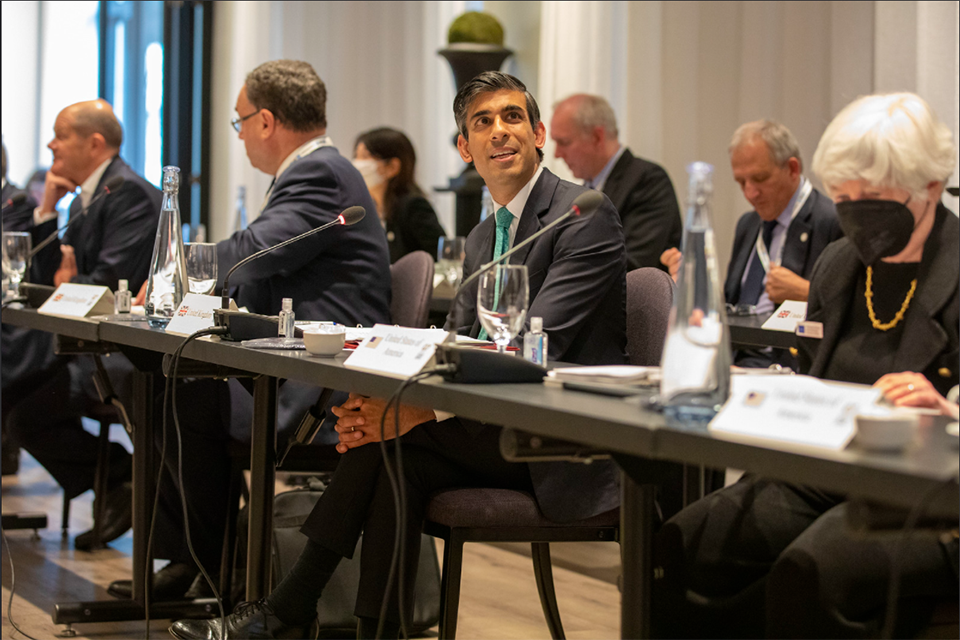
Sunak in October 2021 welcoming an agreement from G7 Finance Ministers to work together to monitor supply chain pressures as the global economy rebounds from COVID-19

=== G7 tax reform ===
Sunak hosted a G7 summit in London in June 2021. A tax reform agreement was signed, which in principle sought to establish a global minimum tax on multinationals and online technology companies. In October 2021, the OECD signed an accord to join the tax reform plan.

=== COP 26 ===
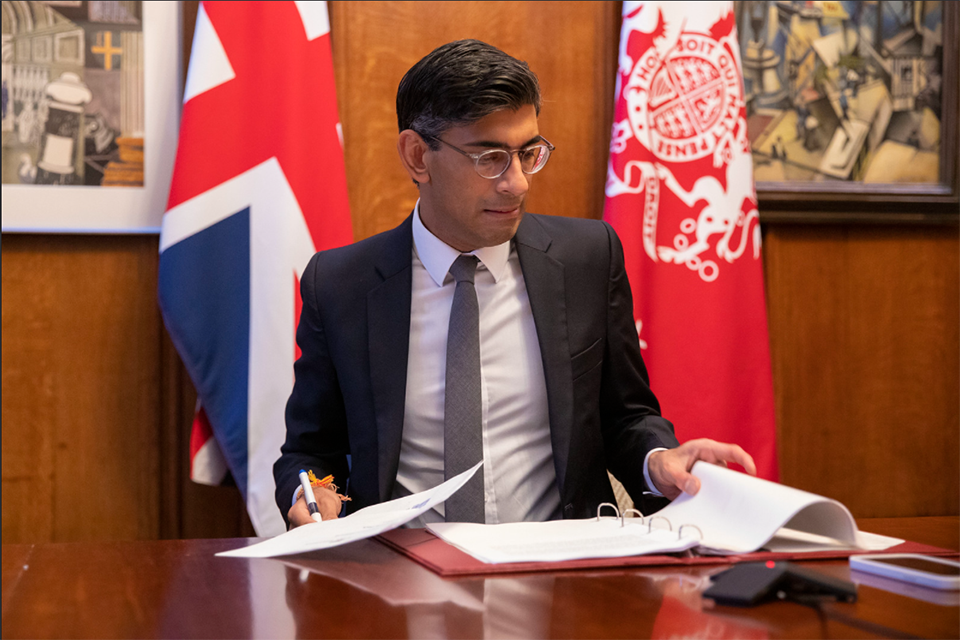
Sunak hailing global cooperation in October 2021, after 136 countries agreed a new system ensuring large multi-nationals pay the right tax in the right places

Sunak attended COP 26 in Glasgow. During the speech he gave on 3 November, he said that he felt optimism despite daunting challenges and that by bringing together finance ministers, businesses and investors, COP 26 could begin to deliver targets from the Paris Agreement. He outlined three actions: First, the need for increased public investment, with the U.K. committing £100 million to the Taskforce on Access to Climate Finance. He announced support for a new Capital Markets Mechanism which will issue green bonds in the U.K. to fund renewable energy in developing countries. Second, mobilising private finance, with the Glasgow Financial Alliance for Net Zero bringing together organisations with assets over $130 trillion to be deployed. Third, the rewiring of the entire global financial system for net zero, which would include better climate data, mandatory sustainability disclosures, climate risk surveillance and stronger global reporting standards. Also announced was that the UK will become the first ever ‘Net Zero Aligned Financial Centre’.

==== Proposed green levy ====
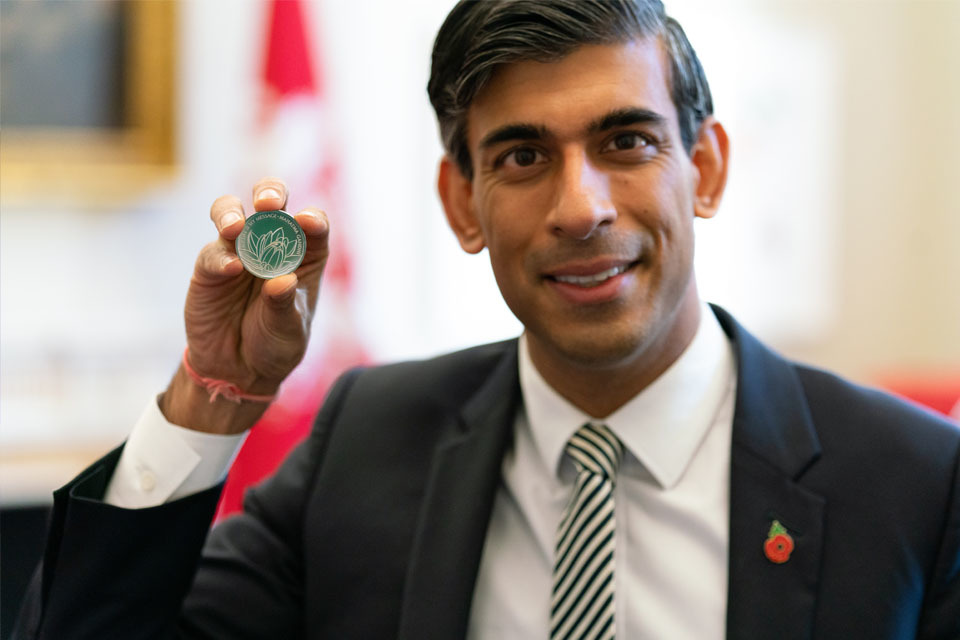
Sunak in November 2021, holding a commemorative coin of Mahatma Gandhi

Sunak privately lobbied to impose a green levy, which would have led to higher petrol and diesel prices, to help pay for the plan to reduce greenhouse gas emissions to net zero by 2050. The proposed Fossil Fuels Emissions Trading Scheme, drawn up by the Treasury, sought to levy pollution from road transportation, as well as shipping, building heating and diesel trains, which together make up more than 40% of UK carbon emissions. The proposal was ultimately rejected by Johnson, who instructed officials that he did not want to increase costs for consumers.

==== Proposed government-backed non-fungible token (NFT) ====
Sunak proposed new laws that would pave the way for stablecoins to be used for everyday payments, despite fears from the Bank of England about the financial stability of the technology. In April 2022, Sunak ordered the Royal Mint to create a UK government-backed non-fungible token (NFT) to be issued by summer 2022.

=== Economic ties with China ===
Sunak promoted trade talks in pursuit of stronger economic ties with China.

=== Sunak and his family's wealth ===
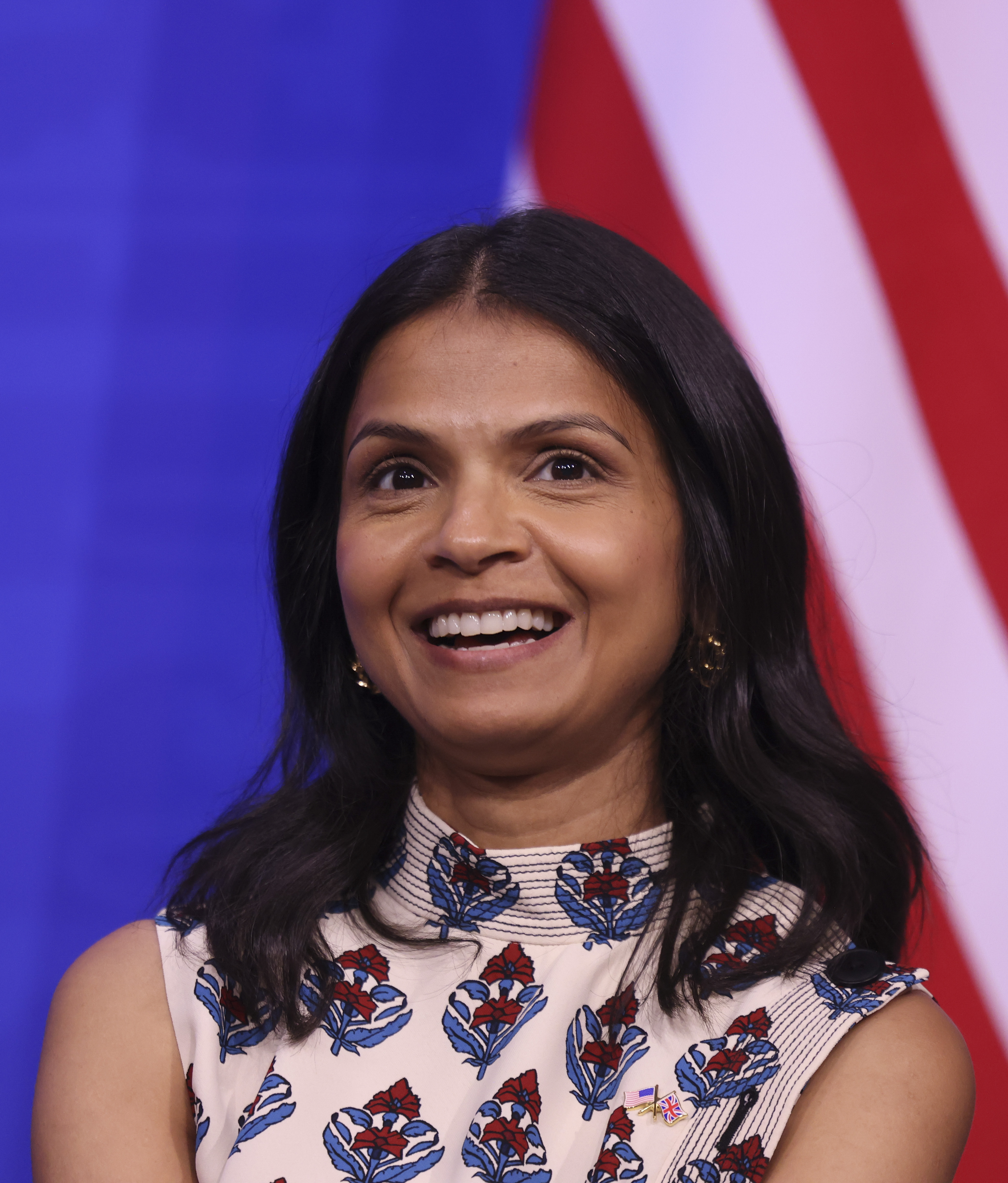
Sunak's wife Akshata Murty

In November 2020, Sunak was reported by The Guardian to have not declared a significant amount of his wife Akshata Murty and family's financial interests on the register of ministers' interests, including a combined £1.7 billion shareholding in the Indian company Infosys. Alistair Graham, former chair of the Committee on Standards in Public Life stated Sunak should disclose his financial interests and those of his close family due to "the chancellor's capacity to determine the government's financial and business policies. He seems to have taken the most minimalist approach possible to this requirement. Perhaps Rishi Sunak should carefully read the 'Seven principles of Public Life' to make sure he is fulfilling the two principles of 'Honesty and Leadership'." Ministers are required to declare interests that are "relevant" to their responsibilities and "which might be thought to give rise to a conflict" with their public duties. The independent adviser on ministers' interests investigated and concluded that Sunak had not broken any rules.

In early 2022, newspapers reported that Murty had non-domiciled status, meaning she did not have to pay tax on income earned abroad while living in the UK. The status cost approximately £30,000 to secure, and allowed her to avoid paying an estimated £20 million in UK taxes. Following media controversy, Murty stated on 8 April that she would pay UK taxes on her global income, adding in a statement that she did not want the issue "to be a distraction for my husband". A Whitehall inquiry was launched into who had leaked the details of her tax status.

Reporting around this time also revealed that Sunak had continued to hold United States' permanent resident (green card) status he had acquired in the 2000s until 2021, including for 18 months after he was made chancellor, which required filing annual US tax returns. An investigation into both his wife's tax status and his residency status found that Sunak had not broken any ministerial rules.

== Budgets ==
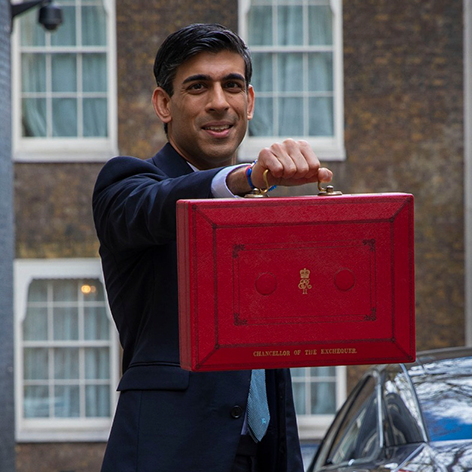
Sunak holding up a red box containing the 2020 budget speech

Sunak delivered three budgets during his chancellorship, one in March 2020, and two in March and October of 2021. He also delivered three mini-budgets, the July 2020 summer statement, September 2020 Winter Economy Plan, and March 2022 spring statement. Most of Sunak's budgets focused on economic support to mitigate the impact of COVID-19, while his last mini-budget focused on the cost of living.

=== March 2020 budget ===
Sunak's first budget took place on 11 March 2020. This included £30 billion of additional spending, of which £12 billion was allocated for mitigation of the economic effects of the COVID-19 pandemic, which had begun to spread rapidly throughout the country. It was scheduled to be followed by another budget in the autumn, but in September 2020 the Treasury announced that budget would be scrapped because of COVID-19, with Sunak stating "now is not the right time to outline long-term plans – people want to see us focused on the here and now".

=== July 2020 summer statement ===
The July 2020 summer statement (also known as the coronavirus mini-budget) was delivered by Sunak on 8 July 2020. The purpose of the statement was to announce measures aimed at helping to promote economic recovery following the impact of the COVID-19 pandemic. The statement was delivered to the House of Commons, where Sunak unveiled a spending package worth £30bn. Concerns were subsequently raised by organisations including HM Revenue and Customs and the Institute for Fiscal Studies about the statement's impact, as well as its cost-effectiveness, while at least one major retailer declined to take advantage of a financial bonus scheme intended for rehiring employees placed on furlough during the pandemic.

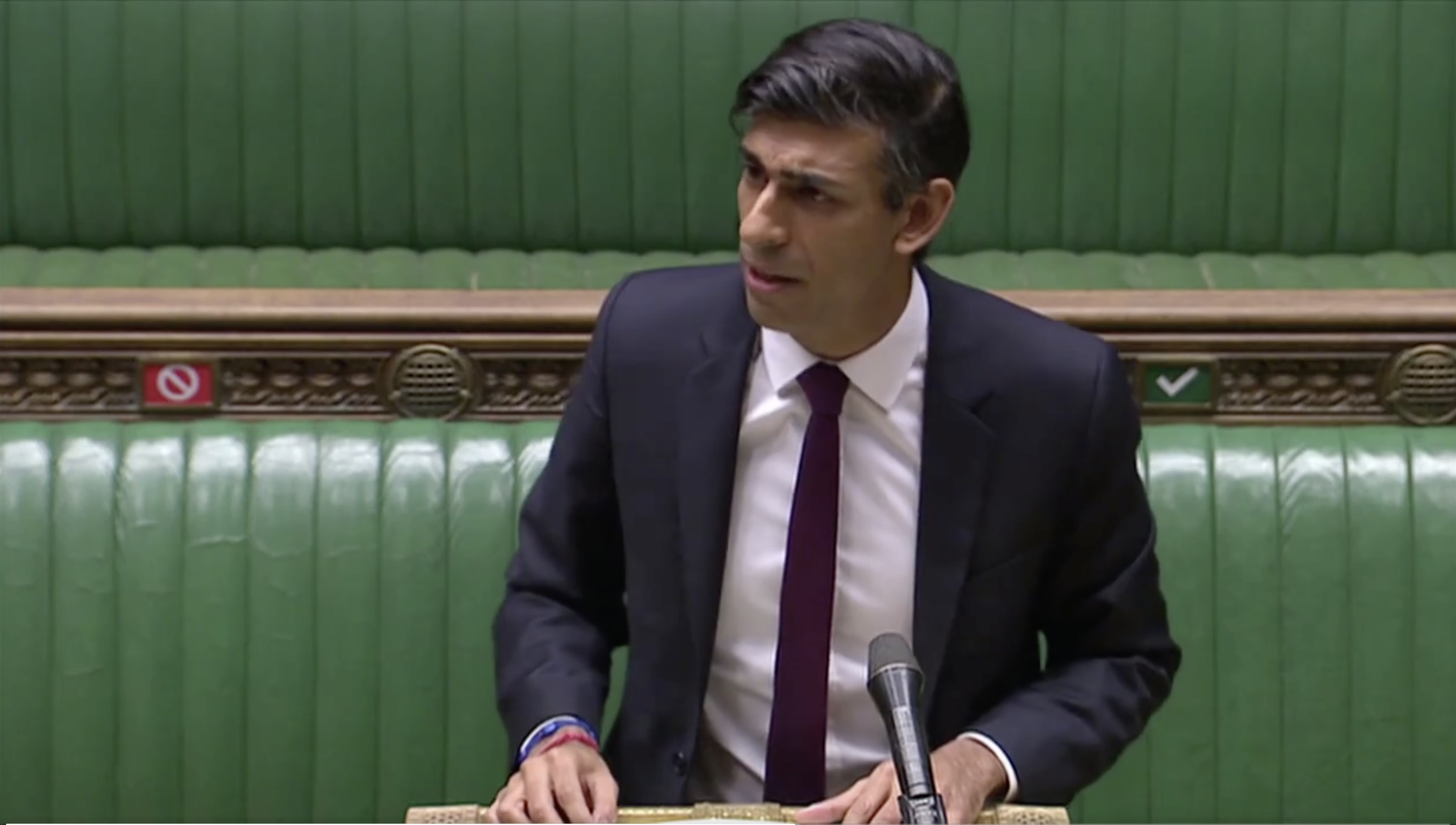
Sunak delivering a speech on the September 2020 Winter Economy Plan in September 2020

=== September 2020 Winter Economy Plan ===
The Winter Economy Plan was delivered by Sunak on 24 September 2020. The purpose of the statement was to announce measures aimed at further helping to promote economic recovery following the impact of the COVID-19 pandemic. The plan aimed to further promote economic recovery while preserving jobs and businesses which were considered viable.

=== March 2021 budget ===
In his March 2021 budget, Sunak emphasized the effect the COVID-19 pandemic has had on the economy, with 700,000 people losing their jobs, the economy shrinking by 10% (the largest fall in 300 years), and the highest borrowing outside wartime. The budget included an increase in the rate of corporation tax from 19% to 25% in 2023, a five-year freeze in the tax-free personal allowance and the higher rate income tax threshold, and the extension of the furlough scheme until the end of September. Sunak was the first Chancellor to raise the corporation tax rate since Labour's Denis Healey in 1974.

=== October 2021 budget ===
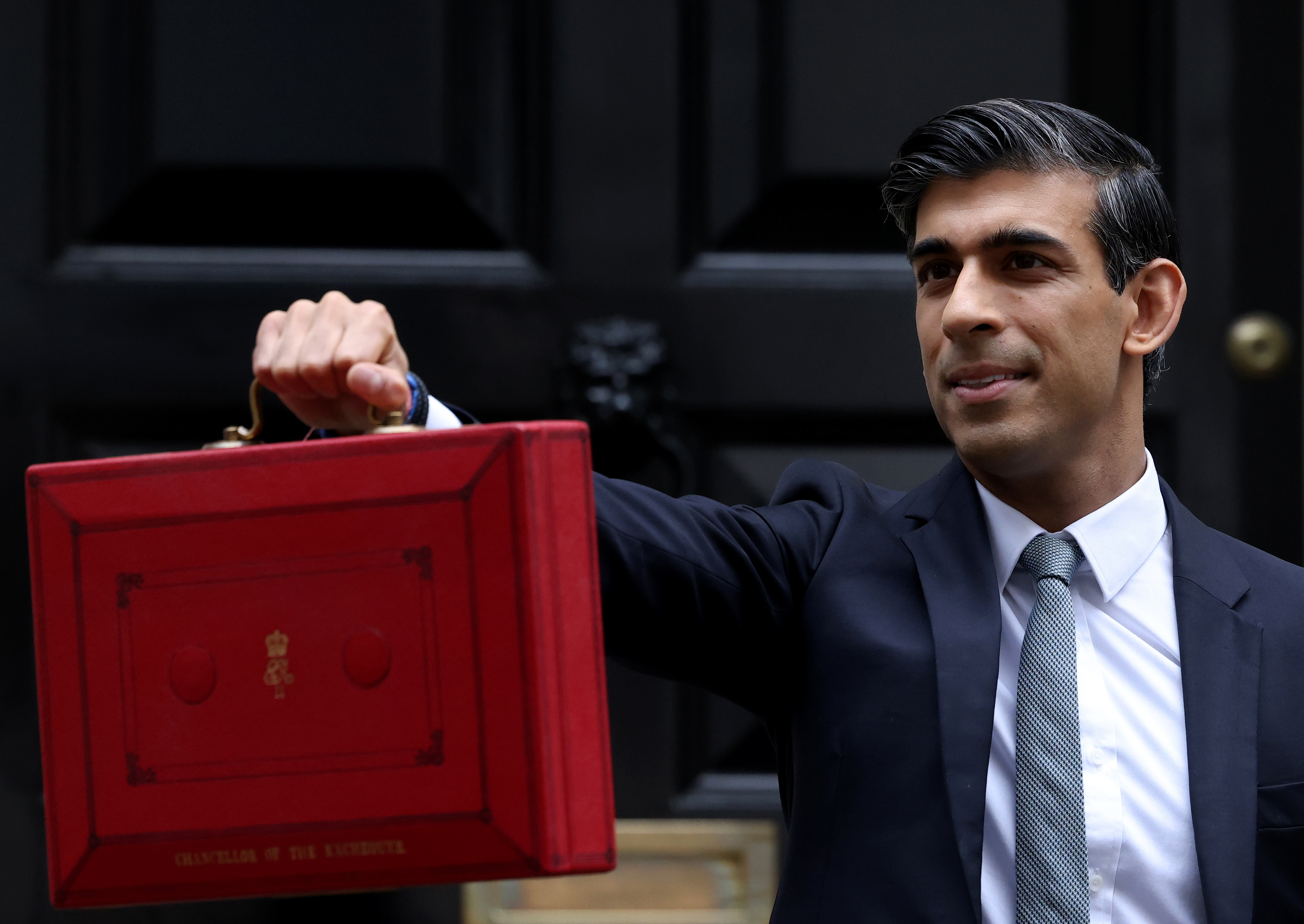
Sunak holding the budget box the day of the October 2021 budget

In October 2021, Sunak made his third and final budget statement, which included substantial spending promises to a large extent related to science and education. The budget increased in-work support through the Universal Credit system by increasing the work allowances by £500 a year, and reducing the post-tax deduction taper rate from 63% to 55%. £560m of investment was announced for the Levelling Up White Paper. Many of the announcements to be made in the budget were previewed before budget day, drawing criticism and anger from the House of Commons. In response to the criticism, Sunak said the budget "begins the work of preparing for a new economy".

=== March 2022 spring statement ===
Sunak made his spring statement on 23 March 2022. He cut fuel duty, removed VAT on energy saving equipment (such as solar panels and insulation) and reduced national insurance payments for small businesses and, while continuing with a planned national insurance rise in April, he promised to align the primary threshold with the basic personal income allowance as of July. He also promised a reduction in income tax in 2024. Sunak also provided some funding to help vulnerable people cope with the rising cost of living.

== Resignation as Chancellor ==
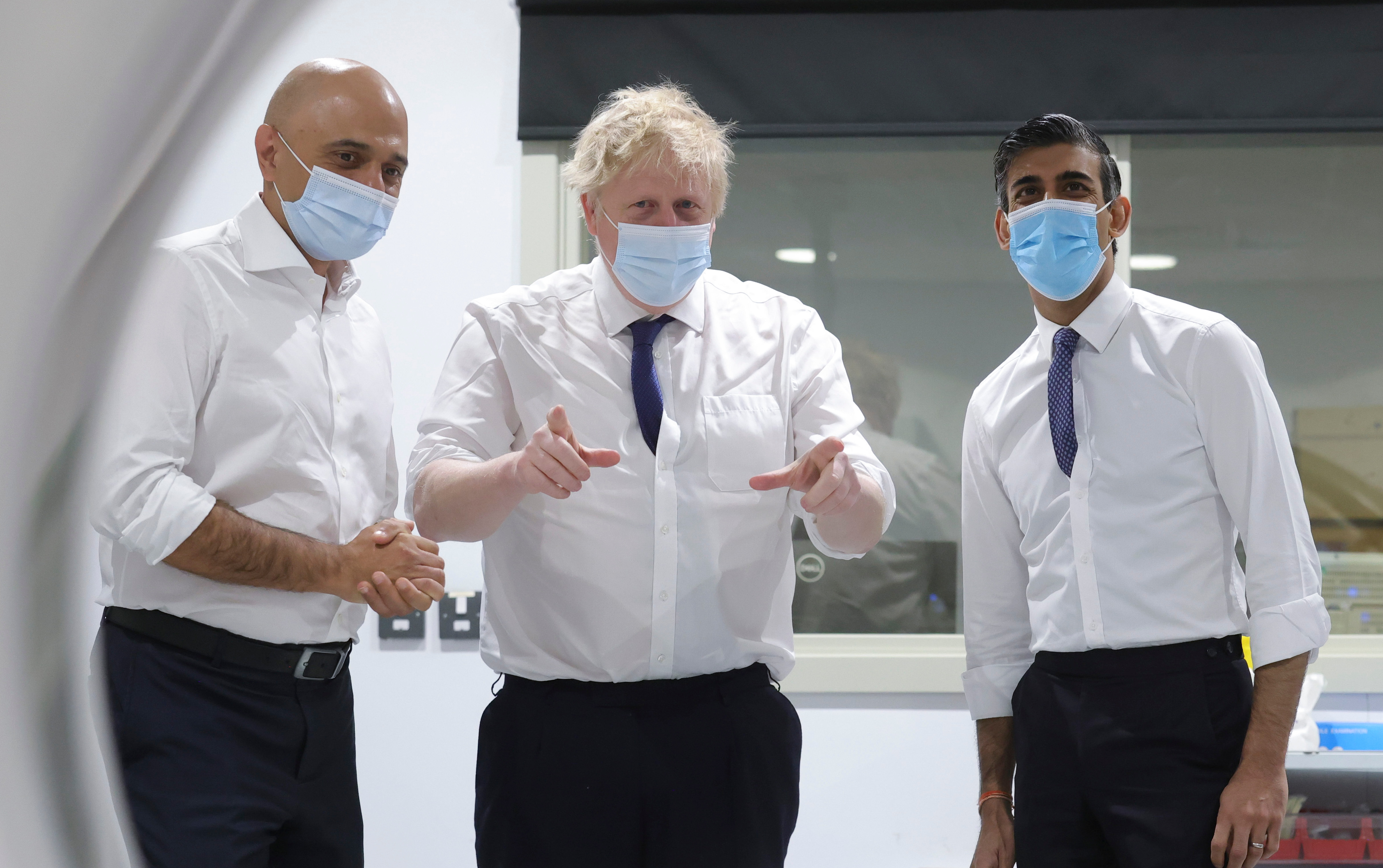
Sajid Javid (left) pictured with Sunak: the pair resigned within minutes of each other in July 2022, contributing to the collapse of the government of Boris Johnson (centre).

On 5 July 2022, Sunak and Health Secretary Javid resigned almost simultaneously amid a scandal surrounding the sexual harassment allegations against Chris Pincher, which arose after it was revealed that Johnson had promoted Pincher to the position of Deputy Chief Whip despite knowing of the allegations beforehand. Sunak was the second of 61 Conservative MPs to resign during the government crisis. In his resignation letter Sunak said:

It is with deep sadness that I am writing to you to resign from the Government. To leave ministerial office is a serious matter at any time. For me to step down as Chancellor while the world is suffering the economic consequences of the pandemic, the war in Ukraine and other serious challenges is a decision that I have not taken lightly. However, the public rightly expect government to be conducted properly, competently and seriously. I recognise this may be my last ministerial job, but I believe these standards are worth fighting for and that is why I am resigning. Our country is facing immense challenges. We both want a low-tax, high-growth economy, and world class public services, but this can only be responsibly delivered if we are prepared to work hard, make sacrifices and take difficult decisions. I firmly believe the public are ready to hear that truth. Our people know that if something is too good to be true then it's not true. They need to know that whilst there is a path to a better future, it is not an easy one. In preparation for our proposed joint speech on the economy next week, it has become clear to me that our approaches are fundamentally too different. I am sad to be leaving Government but I have reluctantly come to the conclusion that we cannot continue like this.

He was succeeded as chancellor by Nadhim Zahawi. Following the resignations of Javid and Sunak, numerous junior ministers and among the Parliamentary Private Secretary (PPS) also resigned, most of whom cited a lack of honesty and integrity on the part of Johnson. In the following 24 hours, 36 MPs resigned from their roles in government. This marked both the largest number of ministerial resignations in a 24-hour period since the British Empire Economic Conference in 1932, and the largest number of such resignations on record. After a total of 62 resignations, Johnson announced on 7 July his resignation as Conservative leader and prime minister.

== Public image ==
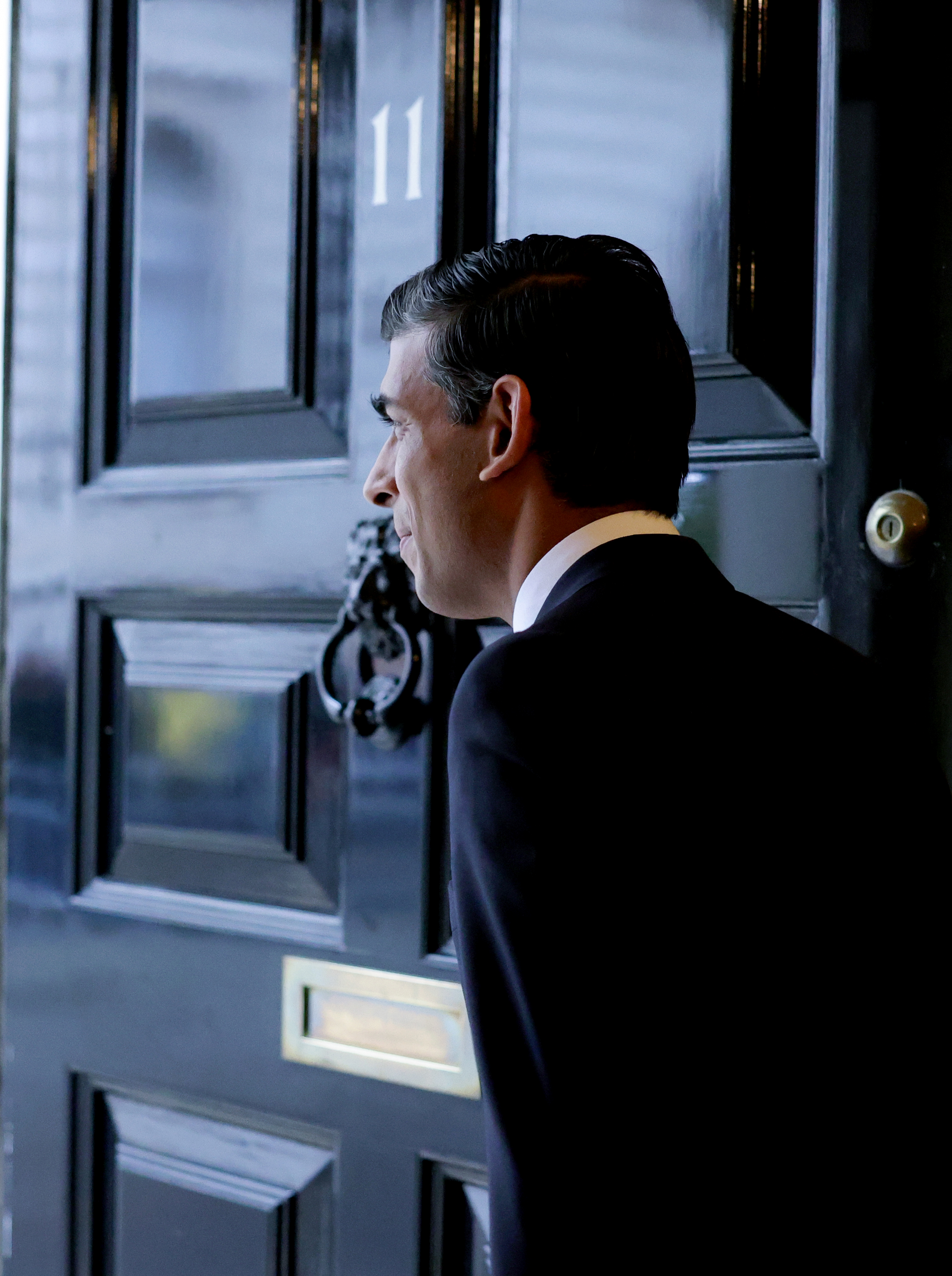
Sunak as chancellor. During his tenure he received high approval ratings

Following his appointment as chancellor, Sunak arrived in public discourse from relative obscurity. Some political commentators saw Sunak's appointment as signalling the end of the Treasury's independence from Downing Street, with Robert Shrimsley, chief political commentator of the Financial Times, arguing that "good government often depends on senior ministers – and the Chancellor in particular – being able to fight bad ideas".

In the early stages of the COVID-19 pandemic, he was popular by the standards of British politics, described by one analyst as having "better ratings than any politician since the heydays of Tony Blair". Various polls showed Sunak remained overwhelmingly popular among Conservative supporters and many other Britons throughout 2020. In an Ipsos MORI poll in September 2020, Sunak had the highest satisfaction score of any British chancellor since Labour's Denis Healey in April 1978, and was widely seen as the favourite to become the Conservative leader after Boris Johnson. Sunak developed a cult media following, with jokes and gossip about his attractiveness widespread on social media and in magazines, gaining the nickname "Dishi Rishi".

Public attitudes towards Sunak remained broadly positive in 2021, though his popularity declined steadily over time. By early 2022, with the cost of living becoming a growing focus of public concern, Sunak's response as chancellor was perceived as inadequate and he received some of his lowest approval ratings, which continued as the Sunak family's financial affairs came under scrutiny. By the time he resigned as chancellor in July 2022, Sunak's approval ratings slightly recovered.

== See also ==
- Premiership of Boris Johnson
- Chancellorship of Gordon Brown
