= Mini-budget =

Mini-budget may refer to:

- July 2020 United Kingdom summer statement, also known as the Coronavirus mini-budget
- September 2020 United Kingdom Winter Economy Plan, sometimes referred to as a mini-budget
- September 2022 United Kingdom mini-budget, a fiscal event that led to market disruption and the fall of the Liz Truss government

== See also ==
- Spring Statement, sometimes referred to as a mini-budget
