= Green Homes Grant =

British government scheme

The Green Homes Grant was a British government scheme to subsidise the cost of energy efficient home improvements in England.

== Overview ==
Under the Green Homes Grant, Homeowners or residential landlords in England could apply for a voucher towards the cost of installing energy efficient improvements to their home.

The vouchers covered up to two-thirds of the cost of eligible improvements, up to a maximum government contribution of £5,000. If someone in the household was in receipt of certain benefits then the household could be eligible for a voucher covering 100% of the cost of the improvements, up to a maximum government contribution of £10,000. Landlords were not eligible for the higher low income voucher.

== History ==
The scheme was announced by Chancellor Rishi Sunak during the July 2020 Summer Statement. A total of £2 billion was earmarked for the scheme.

In November 2020, the Prime Minister Boris Johnson announced the scheme would be extended for an extra year, until the end of March 2022.

The scheme closed to new applications at the end of March 2021.

== Criticism ==
=== Environmental Audit Committee report ===
In March 2021, the House of Commons Environmental Audit Committee released a report into the government’s progress on energy efficiency measures, titled 'Energy Efficiency of Existing Homes'.

== See also ==
- Energy policy of the United Kingdom
- Energy efficiency in British housing
- The Green Deal
