= Spring Statement =

United Kingdom economic statement delivered by the Chancellor of the Exchequer

The Spring Statement of the British Government is one of the two statements HM Treasury makes each year to Parliament upon publication of economic forecasts, the second being the budget presented in the autumn. Both usually involve speeches in the House of Commons by the Chancellor of the Exchequer. Depending on its timing, the statement may also be known as the Summer Statement or the Autumn Statement. Under New Labour it was called the Pre-Budget Report and it was also referred to in 2022 as a mini-budget.

== History ==
The duty to publish two annual economic forecasts was created by the Industry Act 1975, with the first such publication occurring in December 1976. The first Autumn Statement in 1982 from Conservative Chancellor Geoffrey Howe combined the announcement of this publication with any announced changes to national insurance contributions and the Government's announcement of its spending plans (and publication of the Red Book), both of which were also made at approximately the same time in the parliamentary year.

In 1993, Conservative Chancellor Kenneth Clarke combined the announcement of spending with the Budget, merging tax and spending announcements. Doing so moved the Budget to November. To fulfill the legal obligation to make two statements, Clarke began the practice of making a Summer Statement focusing on economic growth forecasts. Unlike the Autumn Statements preceding them and the Pre-Budget Reports that replaced them, Summer Statements took the form of debate on a motion "that this House welcomes the publication of the Government's latest economic forecast, which..." rather than as a statement to the House of Commons.

In 1997, Labour's new Chancellor, Gordon Brown, moved the Budget back to spring and replaced the second statement with the Pre-Budget Report (PBR). According to the "Code for Fiscal Stability", published by HM Treasury in November 1998, the PBR was intended to "encourage debate on the proposals under consideration for the Budget". The PBR included a report on progress since the Budget, an update on the state of the national economy and the Government's finances, and announcements of proposed new tax measures and consultation papers.

Conservative Chancellor George Osborne replaced the PBR and its policy announcements in 2010 with a new Autumn Statement focusing on economic growth and government finances as projected by the Office of Budget Responsibility (OBR). Osborne's 2015 statement on 25 November was a joint Autumn Statement and Spending Review, and included a new forecast by the OBR.

In 2016, Conservative Chancellor Philip Hammond announced his intention to end the Autumn Statement: instead of a Budget in the spring, and an Autumn Statement, there was instead a Budget in the autumn, and a Spring Statement, with the first held on 13 March 2018.

The Spring Statement for 2019 took place in March 2019. In 2020, the Spring Statement was upgraded to a full budget following cancellation of autumn 2019's budget. and additional statements were made in summer and autumn 2020. In 2021, the Spring Statement was also replaced by a full budget.

== Summary of statement names ==
- Autumn Statement (1982–1992, 2010–2016, 2022–2023)
- Summer Statement (1993–1996, 2020)
- Pre-Budget Report (1997–2009)
- Spring Statement (2018–2019, 2022, 2025–present)
- Winter Economy Plan (2020)
- The Growth Plan (2022)

From 1976 to 1981 no specific name was given to the statement.

== List of statements ==
Chancellor	Date	Type
Denis Healey	15 December 1976	Statement
Denis Healey	26 October 1977	Statement
Geoffrey Howe	24 November 1980	Statement
Geoffrey Howe	2 December 1981	Statement
Geoffrey Howe	8 November 1982	Autumn Statement
Nigel Lawson	17 November 1983	Autumn Statement
Nigel Lawson	12 November 1984	Autumn Statement
Nigel Lawson	12 November 1985	Autumn Statement
Nigel Lawson	6 November 1986	Autumn Statement
Nigel Lawson	3 November 1987	Autumn Statement
Nigel Lawson	1 November 1988	Autumn Statement
John Major	15 November 1989	Autumn Statement
John Major	8 November 1990	Autumn Statement
Norman Lamont	6 November 1991	Autumn Statement
Norman Lamont	12 November 1992	Autumn Statement
Kenneth Clarke	18 July 1994	Summer Statement
Kenneth Clarke	12 July 1995	Summer Statement
Kenneth Clarke	17 July 1996	Summer Statement
Gordon Brown	25 November 1997	Pre-Budget Report
Gordon Brown	3 November 1998	Pre-Budget Report
Gordon Brown	9 November 1999	Pre-Budget Report
Gordon Brown	8 November 2000	Pre-Budget Report
Gordon Brown	27 November 2001	Pre-Budget Report
Gordon Brown	27 November 2002	Pre-Budget Report
Gordon Brown	10 December 2003	Pre-Budget Report
Gordon Brown	2 December 2004	Pre-Budget Report
Gordon Brown	5 December 2005	Pre-Budget Report
Gordon Brown	6 December 2006	Pre-Budget Report
Alistair Darling	9 October 2007	Pre-Budget Report
Alistair Darling	24 November 2008	Pre-Budget Report
Alistair Darling	9 December 2009	Pre-Budget Report
George Osborne	29 November 2010	Autumn Statement
George Osborne	29 November 2011	Autumn Statement
George Osborne	5 December 2012	Autumn Statement
George Osborne	5 December 2013	Autumn Statement
George Osborne	3 December 2014	Autumn Statement
George Osborne	25 November 2015	Autumn Statement
Philip Hammond	23 November 2016	Autumn Statement
Philip Hammond	13 March 2018	Spring Statement
Philip Hammond	13 March 2019	Spring Statement
Rishi Sunak	8 July 2020	Summer Statement
Rishi Sunak	24 September 2020	Winter Economy Plan
Rishi Sunak	23 March 2022	Spring Statement
Kwasi Kwarteng	23 September 2022	The Growth Plan (mini-budget)
Jeremy Hunt	17 November 2022	Autumn Statement
Jeremy Hunt	22 November 2023	Autumn Statement
Rachel Reeves	26 March 2025	Spring Statement
Rachel Reeves	3 March 2026	Spring Statement
