= March 2026 United Kingdom spring statement =

- Presented: 3 March 2026
- Parliament: 59th
- Party: Labour Party
- Chancellor: Rachel Reeves

The March 2026 United Kingdom spring statement was delivered to the House of Commons by Rachel Reeves, the chancellor of the exchequer, on 3 March 2026.

== Background ==
On 3 March 2026, the spring budget statement was given to the House of Commons by the chancellor of the exchequer, Rachel Reeves.

== The statement ==
In the statement, Reeves said it was the "right economic plan" for the UK as the budget watchdog slashed its forecast of growth for the year.

The statement did not contain any major tax or policy changes, but did confirm that previously announced pension, benefits and savings changes are coming into force.
