= March 2025 United Kingdom spring statement =

- Country: United Kingdom
- Parliament: 2024
- Party: Labour Party
- Chancellor: Rachel Reeves

The March 2025 United Kingdom spring statement was delivered to the House of Commons by Rachel Reeves, the chancellor of the exchequer, on 25 March 2025.

== Background ==
The 2024 general election resulted in a Labour landslide. Rachel Reeves presented her first budget as Chancellor in October 2024. Subsequently, economic growth was less than expected and government bond yields and inflation rose.

The spring budget statement was expected to focus on public finances, economic growth and the cost of living crisis. The proposed spending cuts were presented to the Office for Budget Responsibility (OBR) on 5 March. On 8 March, ITV News reported that large cuts would be in the statement. Keir Starmer said that he would be "ruthless" in cutting benefits on a visit to Ukraine. These cuts are intended to allow increased defence spending. The Chancellor ruled out further tax rises. Ministers have made the "moral case" for reform. Billions of pounds in welfare cuts were predicted. The government had described this as "reducing the welfare bill by getting people off benefits and into work". There were fears from his own MPs of a return to austerity.

There was speculation that Reeves might extend the freeze on tax thresholds beyond 2028. Changes to inheritance tax and Individual Savings Accounts were also expected. Expanding of VAT on private school fees for nurseries or university education or private healthcare have been suggested. Spending cuts to government departments is a suggested way of stabilising public finances according to the Office for Budget Responsibility (OBR). Proposed cuts have been supported by the opposition Conservatives. Cuts to Personal Independence Payment have been controversial among Labour MPs. Also criticised were David Lammy's cuts to foreign aid. Rachael Maskell warned ministers against "draconian cuts". Former Shadow Chancellor John McDonnell vocally opposed cuts to the Department for Work and Pensions. Secretary of State for Work and Pensions Liz Kendall has pledged large scale reform. She presented a green paper on welfare reform, the largest changes in over a decade.

Charities including The Trussell Trust, Scope, and Mind wrote a letter to the government opposing the cuts. Many of the new Labour MPs elected at the 2024 general election had campaigned in opposition to Conservative austerity and welfare cuts. 80 MPs were reported as possible rebels on the vote, which would be the biggest rebellion of the Starmer premiership so far. These rebels had been previously critical of the cuts to the winter fuel allowance and the retention of the two-child benefit cap.

On 12 March, the anticipation of welfare changes the issue was raised in Prime Minister's Questions by Ed Davey and Richard Burgon. The same day, all 404 Labour MPs were summoned to Downing Street for a briefing on the spring statement. This vote is considered a significant test of loyalty. The welfare reform is supported by the "Get Britain Working Group" set up by David Pinto-Duschinsky. A letter in support of Liz Kendall's proposals was signed by 36 Labour MPs. Stoke-on-Trent South MP Allison Gardner said her name was added erroneously to the letter. Scottish Labour signatories included Graeme Downie, Blair McDougall, Frank McNally, Gregor Poynton and Joani Reid.

On 17 March, Reeves met with industry regulators. She is expected to announce more plans for cutting regulations, including environmental measures, and abolishing quangos. Starmer and Reeves are under pressure from MPs and charities over benefit changes. Diane Abbott said a wealth tax would be better as cutting disability benefits is "not a Labour thing to do". Treasury minister Emma Reynolds said "there will always be a safety net for the most vulnerable". The proposed cuts will amount to £5–6 billion.

An Institute for Fiscal Studies report showed that the number of people claiming health-related benefits has grown since the COVID-19 pandemic. Between 2002 and 2024, the number of 16–64-year-olds claiming disability benefits increased from 360,000 to 1.28 million. On 21 March, Reeves pledged no return to "tax and spend". This was amid potential cuts to Universal Credit and the Personal Independence Payment.

On 25 March 2025, BBC News Online reported that unannounced cuts to benefits and government departments would be made.

== The statement ==
The spring statement was scheduled to be made at 12:30pm in the House of Commons. There was emphasis on increasing defence spending. Major welfare announcements included restrictions on universal credit and its health-related element in particular, and eligibility for personal independence payments. The health-related element of universal credit will no longer be available to young people aged under 22. 10,000 Civil Service jobs are set to be cut. Late payment penalties related to VAT and self-assessed income tax liabilities will be increased from 6 April 2025: the new rates will be 3% of the tax outstanding where tax is overdue by 15 days, a further 3% where either tax is overdue by 30 days, and an additional 10% per annum where either tax is overdue by 31 days or more.

== Aftermath and U-turn ==
In the months following the spring statement, the government faced mounting opposition to its proposed welfare reforms, particularly changes to Personal Independence Payment (PIP) and the health-related element of Universal Credit. The reforms, initially projected to save £5.5 billion by 2029–30, were met with criticism from disability rights groups and over 120 Labour MPs, prompting a series of concessions by ministers.

By early July 2025, the government announced a partial reversal of the reforms. Plans to tighten PIP eligibility were shelved pending a review by Disability Minister Stephen Timms, and protections were introduced for existing Universal Credit claimants. The Office for Budget Responsibility later confirmed that the revised package would deliver no net savings, leaving a significant gap in the Chancellor’s fiscal strategy.

On 2 July 2025, Chancellor Reeves appeared visibly emotional during Prime Minister’s Questions, wiping away tears as Prime Minister Keir Starmer faced questions over the U-turn. Her office attributed the moment to a “personal matter,” but the timing drew media attention amid speculation about her position. Downing Street later stated that Reeves had the Prime Minister’s full backing and would remain in her role.
