= March 2021 United Kingdom budget =

- Presented: Wednesday 3 March 2021
- Country: United Kingdom
- Parliament: 58th
- Party: Conservative Party
- Chancellor: Rishi Sunak
- Total revenue: £819 billion
- Total expenditures: £1.053 trillion
- Deficit: £234 billion
- Website: Budget 2021

The March 2021 United Kingdom budget, officially known as Protecting the Jobs and Livelihoods of the British People, was a budget delivered by Rishi Sunak, the Chancellor of the Exchequer in March 2021. It was expected to be delivered in autumn 2020, but was postponed because of the COVID-19 pandemic. It succeeds the budget held in March 2020, and the summer statement and Winter Economy Plan held in summer and autumn 2020, respectively. The budget is the second under Boris Johnson's government, also the second to be delivered by Sunak and the second since Britain's withdrawal from the European Union. The budget was the first for government expenditure in the United Kingdom to exceed £1 trillion.

It was confirmed on the previous day that the Coronavirus Job Retention Scheme and the Self Employment Income Support Scheme had been extended to 30 September 2021.

== Key measures ==
In his budget speech, Rishi Sunak emphasised the effect the COVID-19 pandemic had on the economy, with 700,000 people losing their jobs, the economy shrinking by 10% (the largest fall in 300 years), and the highest borrowing outside wartime. It is expected that unemployment will peak at 6.5% (an improvement on the previous estimate of 11.9%) and that the budget deficit will reach £355 billion in 2021, or 17% of GDP, the highest level in peacetime.

Measures in the budget include:

=== COVID-19 ===
- Extension of the Coronavirus Job Retention Scheme and Self Employment Income Support Scheme until the end of September
- £1.65 billion injection into the COVID-19 vaccine roll-out in England
- £28 million to increase the UK's capacity for vaccine testing, clinical trials and improve the UK's ability to acquire samples of new variants of SARS-CoV-2
- £22 million to test the effectiveness of combinations of different COVID-19 vaccines
- An extra £5 million investment in clinical-scale mRNA manufacturing
- Extending £500 NHS Test and Trace support payments in England until the summer
- Total COVID-19 support package for 2021–22 is £352 billion

=== Taxation ===
- No changes to rates of income tax, national insurance contributions, or value-added tax
- Tax-free personal allowance frozen at £12,570 for five years from 6 April 2021
- Higher rate income tax threshold frozen at £50,270 for five years from 6 April 2021
- Corporation tax on company profits above £250,000 to rise from 19% to 25% in April 2023
  - Rate to be kept at 19% for smaller companies with profits of less than £50,000
- Stamp Duty holiday on house purchases in England and Northern Ireland extended to 30 June 2021 for purchases up to £500,000 and to 30 September for prices up to £125,000
- Inheritance tax thresholds, pensions life time allowances and annual capital gains tax exemptions to be frozen at 2020–2021 levels until 2025–26

It is expected that the measures will cause borrowing to fall to 4.5% of GDP in 2022–23, 3.5% in 2023–24, 2.9% in 2024–2025, and 2.8% in 2025–2026.

- The national debt is expected to rise from 88.8% of GDP in 2021 to 93.8% in 2022, 97.1% in 2023–24, 97% in 2024–2025 and 96.8% in 2025–2026
- The Office for Budget Responsibility has estimated a budget deficit of £394 billion in 2020–21

=== Business, digital and science ===
- Tax breaks for firms to "unlock" £20 billion worth of business investment
- Firms can deduct investment costs from tax bills, reducing taxable profits by 130%
- Incentives for firms to take on apprentices to rise to £3,000, and £126 million for traineeships
- Lower VAT rate for hospitality firms maintained at 5% until September, and an interim 12.5% rate will then apply for the following six months
- Business rates holiday for firms in England to continue until June, followed by a 75% discount
- £5 billion in Restart grants for shops and other businesses in England forced to close
- £6,000 per premises for non-essential outlets due to re-open in April and £18,000 for gyms, personal care providers and other hospitality and leisure businesses
- Visa scheme to help start-ups and rapidly growing tech firms source overseas
- Contactless payment limit to rise to £100 from 15 October 2021
- All alcohol duties to be frozen; no extra tax on spirits, wine, cider or beer
- Fuel duty to be frozen for eleventh consecutive year
- Tobacco duties to rise by inflation plus 2%

=== Health ===
- £19 million for domestic violence programmes and funding network of respite rooms for homeless women
- £40 million funding for victims of 1960s Thalidomide scandal and lifetime support guarantee
- £10 million to support armed forces veterans with mental health needs
- Details released after the speech confirmed allocation of a further £15bn to NHS Test and Trace for 2021–22

=== Arts and sports ===
- £400 million to help re-open arts venues in England, including museums and galleries
- £300 million recovery package for professional sport
  - Includes £25 million for grassroots football
- £1.2 million to help stage the 2022 Women's Euros football tournament in England

=== Environment, transport, infrastructure and housing ===
- New UK Infrastructure Bank to be set up in Leeds
  - £12 billion in capital, with aim of funding £40 billion worth of public and private projects
- £15 billion in green bonds, including for retail investors, to help finance the transition to net zero by 2050

=== Nations and regions ===
- £1.2 billion in funding for the Scottish government, £740 million for the Welsh government and £410 million for the Northern Ireland executive
- £1 billion fund to promote regeneration in 45 English towns, including Middlesbrough, Preston, Swindon, Bournemouth, Newark, West Bromwich and Ipswich
- £150 million for community groups to take over pubs at risk of closure
- Eight sites announced for free-ports in England: East Midlands Airport, Felixstowe and Harwich, Humber, Liverpool City Region, Plymouth, Solent, Thames and Teesside

== Reactions ==
Labour Party leader Keir Starmer announced that the Labour Party will back plans to increase the corporation tax after Sunak announced any rises would be delayed to 2023; Starmer and Shadow Chancellor of the Exchequer Anneliese Dodds had previously voiced strong opposition to tax rises leading up to the budget. However, Starmer has criticised the budget for doing little to address inequality and for prioritizing areas which are represented by Conservative Party MPs, arguing that the budget failed to "rebuild the foundations of our economy or to secure the country's long-term prosperity". Former Shadow Chancellor of the Exchequer John McDonnell similarly claimed that working people would be hit hard by the freeze to the income tax threshold and the cut to universal credit uplift.

Leader of the Liberal Democrats Ed Davey made similar criticisms, particularly in the area of social care. Green Party co-leader Jonathan Bartley said that the budget failed to include new incentives to shift towards a low-carbon economy. Before the budget was announced, Leader of the Scottish National Party in Westminster Ian Blackford argued that the budget should not return to austerity; he called several measures, including extension of the furlough scheme, long-term investment in the National Health Service.

There has been much discussion over the corporation tax raise. Rishi Sunak said that even after the reform, the UK's headline rate would still be the lowest in the G7 nations and would raise an extra £17 billion. However, several commentators and business-persons have suggested that the move could make the UK less attractive to investors and hit dividends; the UK would not look as competitive internationally on other measures because it is much less generous in the share of capital spending that companies are allowed to set against taxable profits. Former Conservative Justice Secretary David Gauke has advocated in favour of raising income tax rates rather than corporation tax, but noted that the Conservative Party's manifesto in the 2019 general election promised not to raise income tax, national insurance contributions and VAT. In contrast, former Labour shadow ministers Ian Lavery and Jon Trickett supported raising corporation tax, arguing that it would hit the profits of big businesses rather than hard-pressed families. Former Labour Shadow Secretary of State for Justice Richard Burgon warned that if the Labour Party does not support a raise in business taxes, it could be "outflanked" by the Conservatives.

Some commentators argued that the freeze in the income tax threshold would effectively increase an individual's tax burden, with the Office for Budget Responsibility predicting that more than one million people would start paying income tax in the next five years. Similarly, some health officials voiced opposition to the budget for failing to include detailed plans for the National Health Service and public services. Charmaine Griffiths of the British Heart Foundation warned that the NHS would not be able to tackle the backlog of treatment and care caused by the pandemic as the budget does not pre-empt the possible rise in COVID-19 infections in winter.

Culture industry leaders welcomed the budget, but called for more help for freelancers and insurance cover for events. Julian Bird of the Society of London Theatre said the extension of furlough, self-employed support, business rates and VAT would help the industry, but urged the government to help those who "fallen through the gaps" of furlough and self-employed support. Cameron Mackintosh said that theatre producers would welcome the help given by the government, but called for more detail. Campaigners related to the Thalidomide scandal welcomed the support given to survivors.
