= 2020 United Kingdom budget =

- Presented: Wednesday 11 March 2020
- Parliament: 58th
- Party: Conservative Party
- Chancellor: Rishi Sunak
- Total revenue: £873 billion
- Total expenditures: £928 billion
- Deficit: £55 billion
- Website: Budget 2020

The 2020 United Kingdom budget, officially known as Budget 2020: Delivering on Our Promises to the British People, was a budget delivered by Rishi Sunak, Chancellor of the Exchequer, to the House of Commons on Wednesday 11 March 2020. It was Sunak's first budget, the first since the withdrawal of the United Kingdom from the European Union, the first since Boris Johnson becoming Prime Minister and the first to be held in the spring since March 2017.

It was scheduled to be followed by another budget in the autumn, but in September 2020 the Treasury announced that budget would be scrapped because of the COVID-19 pandemic, stating "now is not the right time to outline long-term plans – people want to see us focused on the here and now". Instead, additional statements were given by the chancellor in both summer and autumn.
