= September 2020 United Kingdom Winter Economy Plan =

Winter Economy Plan
- Presented: 24 September 2020
- Parliament: 58th
- Party: Conservative Party
- Chancellor: Rishi Sunak

The Winter Economy Plan was a statement from the British Government, or mini-budget statement, delivered on 24 September 2020 by Rishi Sunak, the Chancellor of the Exchequer. It succeeded the summer statement held earlier in the year, and was a partial replacement to the cancelled budget scheduled for the Autumn. The purpose of the statement was to announce measures aimed at further helping to promote economic recovery following the impact of the COVID-19 pandemic. The statement was delivered to the House of Commons. The plan aimed to further promote economic recovery while preserving jobs and businesses which were considered viable.

== Background ==
Rishi Sunak delivered his first budget as Chancellor in March 2020, as the COVID-19 pandemic was in its early stages in the UK. The country went into lockdown, requiring all but essential services to close. The government announced a series of measures to protect companies, and the jobs of employees whose firms were required to close as part of lockdown, including a furlough scheme that would see the government pay 80% of the wages of workers who were furloughed. The scheme was initially to run until the end of June, but later extended twice and at the time was scheduled to end on 30 April 2021. By June, 9.3 million people were being financially supported by the scheme. There were concerns about unemployment, which, by the end of June was nearing 3 million, and threatening to exceed the previous highest unemployment figures last seen in 1986, and fears of a deep recession. In July 2020 Sunak delivered a summer statement aimed at helping to reduce the potential impact of a recession. Sunak delivered the statement to the House of Commons on 8 July.

On 23 September 2020, Sunak announced he would unveil his plans for the future of the economy amidst an increase in COVID-19 restrictions and due to the Coronavirus Job Retention Scheme being originally scheduled to end on 31 October. Hours later, the treasury confirmed the autumn budget had been cancelled.

== Key points ==
The statement included the following provisions:

- The reduction in value-added tax from 20% to 5% for the hospitality sector – food outlets, accommodation and attractions announced in the summer statement was extended to 31 March 2021.
- A new Job Support Scheme designed to replace the Coronavirus Job Retention Scheme whereby the government tops up wages for employees who were brought back from furlough and working a reduced number of hours. The scheme is also extended to businesses that have been forced to close due to law.
- An extension to the Self Employment Income Support Scheme on similar terms to the above scheme.
- Coronavirus Business Interruption loans and Bounceback Loans extended from 6 to 10 years.

== Reaction ==
The announcements were broadly welcomed by the business sector. The Confederation of British Industry (CBI) said the measures would "save hundreds of thousands of viable jobs this winter", while the British Chambers of Commerce said they would give the economy "an important shot in the arm". But the independent think-tank, the Resolution Foundation, suggested that though the Job Protection Scheme would slow the rate of unemployment, it would not stop what it described as "major" job losses. Rob Paterson, the CEO of Best Western GB, said the government's economic strategy had made it impossible for the hospitality sector to retain staff: "Restrictions that have been imposed recently have severely dampened our revenues and the support package that was announced by the Chancellor...means that we're paying a higher hourly rate for our employees in a time when our revenues are severely compounded".
