= July 2020 United Kingdom summer statement =

- Presented: 8 July 2020
- Parliament: 58th
- Party: Conservative Party
- Chancellor: Rishi Sunak

The July 2020 United Kingdom summer statement (also known as the coronavirus mini-budget) was a statement from the British Government, or mini-budget statement, delivered on 8 July 2020 by Rishi Sunak, the Chancellor of the Exchequer. It followed the budget delivered earlier in the year, and preceded the Winter Economy Plan. The purpose of the statement was to announce measures aimed at helping to promote economic recovery following the impact of the COVID-19 pandemic. The statement was delivered to the House of Commons, where Sunak unveiled a spending package worth £30bn. Concerns were subsequently raised by organisations including HM Revenue and Customs and the Institute for Fiscal Studies about the statement's impact, as well as its cost-effectiveness, while at least one major retailer declined to take advantage of a financial bonus scheme intended for rehiring employees placed on furlough during the pandemic.

== Background ==
Sunak delivered his first budget as Chancellor in March 2020, as the COVID-19 pandemic was in its early stages in the UK. Shortly afterwards, the country went into "lockdown", requiring all but essential services to close. The government announced a series of measures to protect companies, and the jobs of employees whose firms were required to close as part of lockdown, including a scheme that would see the government pay 80% of the wages of workers who were furloughed. The scheme was initially to run until the end of June, but later extended to October. By June, 9.3 million people were being financially supported by the scheme.

There were concerns about unemployment, which by the end of June was nearing 3 million and threatening to exceed the previous highest unemployment figures last seen in 1986, and fears of a deep recession. In May 2020 it was announced that Sunak would deliver a summer statement in July aimed at helping to reduce the potential impact of a recession. Sunak delivered the statement to the House of Commons on 8 July.

== Key points ==
The statement included the following provisions:

- A temporary increase of the stamp duty land tax threshold on property purchases from £125,000 to £500,000 with immediate effect until 31 March 2021. (Note: Initially announced to 31 March 2021 but subsequently extended to 30 June.)
- A £1,000 jobs retention bonus for employers who bring back furloughed employees from the beginning of November 2020 until at least the end of January 2021; the bonus to be paid for each employee, and applies to those earning over £520 a month
- The creation of a "kickstart" scheme that will pay employers to train 16–24 year-olds "at risk of long-term unemployment"
- An "Eat Out to Help Out" scheme to encourage customers back into restaurants, bars and cafes: customers to receive a 50% discount, worth up to £10 a head, on meals at participating outlets from Mondays to Wednesdays throughout August 2020
- A reduction in value-added tax from 20% to 5% for the hospitality sector – food outlets, accommodation and attractions – from 15 July 2020 to 12 January 2021. (Note: Whilst initially announced for a six-month period, the VAT reduction was subsequently extended twice and will now run to 30 June 2021.)
- A "green homes grant" to help make properties more energy efficient; the scheme to be extended to public sector buildings

== Reaction ==
Responding to the statement, Anneliese Dodds, the Shadow Chancellor, accused Sunak of putting off the "big decisions" by choosing to present a statement rather than a full budget. Keir Starmer, the leader of the opposition Labour Party, said the bonus scheme "should be targeted in the areas which most need it, not across the piece", while Bridget Phillipson, Labour's Shadow chief secretary to the Treasury, wrote to HM Revenue and Customs to ask them to publish their modelling for the job bonus scheme.

The Institute of Fiscal Studies (IFS) warned that taxes would have to rise to pay for the support measures put in place by the government. The IFS also suggested that raising the stamp duty threshold would adversely affect first-time buyers, who are largely exempt from paying it, while benefiting sellers who could take advantage of the situation with higher property prices. Helen Miller, deputy director of the IFS described first-time buyers as "a group that might actually be made worse off by the policy". The warning of tax rises was echoed by David Gauke, a former Conservative Party minister with HM Treasury, who said that either tax increases or spending cuts would be needed to pay off a £40bn public deficit built up during the pandemic.

In a series of letters sent to the Chancellor before the statement was delivered, Jim Harra, the director of HM Revenue and Customs, questioned whether two of the schemes announced were value for money. He raised concerns about paying companies a £1,000 bonus to retain furloughed workers, a scheme estimated to cost the Treasury £9.4bn, and whether the 50% meal discount, estimated to cost £0.5bn, was cost effective, describing both as "sound policy rationale" but the effectiveness of which would be difficult to measure. In response, the Chancellor said that action was needed to protect jobs, but admitted there would be a "dead weight" cost of the job retention bonus from firms who would have retained their staff anyway. In a BBC interview the day after delivering the statement, Sunak said that he would not be able to protect "every single job" and that the UK was entering a "severe recession".

== Aftermath ==
On 12 July, the High Street clothes retailer Primark became the first major company to say it would not take advantage of the jobs retention bonus, which would allow it to claim up to £30m from the government. Primark had placed 30,000 of its employees on furlough during the pandemic, but had since brought them all back to work. The company's announcement put pressure on other large employers to make similar announcements. On 19 July, property website Rightmove and catering firm Compass announced they would also not claim money from the scheme.

The temporary cut in value-added tax for the hospitality industry, worth £4bn, came into force on 15 July and was to last until 12 January 2021. Nando's, Pret a Manger, KFC and McDonald's were among the firms to announce price reductions as a result.
