= Timeline of the COVID-19 pandemic in the United Kingdom (2023) =

The following is a timeline of the COVID-19 pandemic in the United Kingdom in 2023.

There are significant differences in the legislation and the reporting between the countries of the UK: England, Scotland, Northern Ireland, and Wales. The numbers of cases and deaths are reported on a government website updated daily during the pandemic. The Office for National Statistics (ONS) continued until mid-March to publish estimates of the number of infections (excluding hospitals, care homes and other communal settings) in each country, using regular nose/throat swabs and blood samples. A smaller-scale ONS survey began in December, using lateral flow tests. The UK-wide Zoe Health Study (previously the COVID Symptom Study) which is based on surveys of numerous participants, run by health science company ZOE, and analysed by King's College London researchers, publishes daily estimates of the number of new and total current COVID-19 infections (excluding care homes) in UK regions, without restriction to only laboratory-confirmed cases.

== Events ==
=== January 2023 ===
- 2 January –
  - The UK Health Security Agency issues advice to parents in England, urging them to keep their children off school if they are ill or have a fever. The advice comes amid high cases of COVID-19, influenza, and scarlet fever.
  - The Office for National Statistics estimates that 2.0 million people in private households in the UK have long COVID (with symptoms, primarily fatigue and difficulty concentrating, continuing for more than four weeks after a confirmed or suspected COVID infection). 1.5 million of them say their daily activities are adversely affected.
- 3 January – Speaking amid mounting concern about hospital delays, Health Secretary Steve Barclay warns that flu and COVID-19 are putting "massive pressure" on the National Health Service. He also says that reducing the waiting list backlog caused by the pandemic will "take time".
- 5 January – Legislation comes into effect which requires air passengers travelling from mainland China to England to provide proof of a negative COVID test before departure.
- 6 January – The latest Office for National Statistics data suggests almost three million people were infected with COVID-19 over the Christmas period (the highest since July 2022), with one in 20 having the virus in England, one in 18 in Wales, one in 25 in Scotland and one in 16 in Northern Ireland. XBB.1.5, the new Omicron variant of the virus, is believed to be responsible for one in 200 infections in the UK.
- 10 January –
  - A team of researchers from the Wellcome Sanger Institute is to analyse millions of UK COVID-19 test samples for other serious respiratory viruses, including flu.
  - It is confirmed that the regional Enhanced Therapies and Rehabilitation unit at Whiteabbey Hospital, originally commissioned as one of Northern Ireland's Nightingale Hospitals in November 2020, is to be closed at the end of March 2023.
- 11 January – Andrew Bridgen, the MP for North West Leicestershire, is suspended from the Conservative Party for spreading misinformation about COVID-19 vaccines after posting a tweet comparing them to The Holocaust.
- 13 January –
  - Medical experts criticise the BBC for an interview with Aseem Malhotra who claims that mRNA vaccines may have been responsible for thousands of excess deaths.
  - An inquest into the deaths of Gareth Morgan Roberts and Dominga David, two nurses who died of COVID-19 in April 2020, concludes that it is more likely than not that they died after becoming infected while at work.
  - The latest Office for National Statistics data indicates COVID-19 cases were falling in England and Wales in the week up to 30 December 2022, with cases continuing to increase in Scotland; the picture was unclear for Northern Ireland. In England, an estimated 2,189,300 people were thought to have tested positive for COVID-19.
- 17 January – HM Revenue and Customs has estimated that £4.5bn in COVID-19 support funding has been lost through error or fraud since 2020.
- 18 January – BBC News reports that a woman from Pembrokeshire who shielded from COVID-19 for two and a half years has spent more than £2,000 on Evusheld (a drug not available on the NHS) to improve her immunity. The Welsh Government has responded that it is waiting for guidance on the drug from the Medicines and Healthcare products Regulatory Agency.
- 20 January –
  - A study by the British Heart Foundation has found that as many as half a million people in the UK missed out on starting medication to prevent heart attacks and strokes during the first 18 months after the beginning of the pandemic.
  - Office for National Statistics data for the week up to 10 January indicate COVID-19 infections have continued to fall in England and Wales, with one in 40 people (an estimated 2.6% of the population) testing positive for the virus.
- 22 January – The Catholic Safeguarding Standards Agency launches an "unscheduled" safeguarding audit and review into the Diocese of Hexham and Newcastle amid claims of lockdown gatherings at St Mary's Cathedral in Newcastle during England's third national lockdown in 2021. The review will be carried out by Malcolm McMahon, the Archbishop of Liverpool.
- 25 January – A national study carried out using Bristol's Children of the 90s cohort has indicated that vulnerable people who receive a COVID booster vaccine are equally as protected from the virus as healthy people who received two vaccines. The study analysed 9,000 blood samples from people monitored by the project.
- 26 January – MP Andrew Bridgen has threatened to sue former Health Secretary Matt Hancock after Hancock accused him on Twitter of spreading "antisemitic, anti-vax, anti-scientific conspiracy theories".
- 27 January – Data released by the Office for National Statistics for the week ending 17 January indicate overall cases have continued to fall. In England, the estimated number of people testing positive for COVID-19 was 906,300 (roughly 1.62% of the population or 1 in 60 people).
- 30 January –
  - Analysis by BBC One's Panorama programme suggests that between 5,000 and 10,000 NHS workers who may be off sick with Long COVID will face pay cuts because of changes to COVID sickness policy.
  - Dr Sarah Myhill, a private practitioner from Powys, who posted false claims about COVID-19 vaccines online, is banned from practising for nine months after a hearing conducted by the Medical Practitioners Tribunal Service.
- 31 January – After the Welsh Cancer Network publishes a three-year plan for improving patient experience and outcomes in Wales, Judi Rhys, of Tenovus Cancer Care, warns that the COVID-19 pandemic cannot continue to be blamed for poor cancer care in the country.

=== February 2023 ===
- 3 February – Office for National Statistics data for the week up to 24 January indicates that COVID-19 cases have continued to fall, with an estimated 1 in 70 people (1.42% of the population) testing positive for the virus in England over that time. The data also shows an increase in infections among primary and secondary school children.
- 6 February – Mark Steyn, who used his GB News show to cast doubt on the safety of COVID-19 vaccines, quits the news channel after claiming its bosses tried to make him pay fines issued by the media regulator Ofcom following two investigations into his programme.
- 10 February – Data from the Office for National Statistics for the week ending 31 January indicates COVID-19 cases have risen in England for the first time in 2023, with 1.02 million cases, an increase of 8% from 941,800 the previous week. Data for Scotland and Wales is less clear.
- 12 February – The last available date on which adults in England aged between 16 and 49 can book a COVID-19 booster injection following their two initial vaccines.
- 13 February –
  - Buckingham Palace announces that Queen Camilla has tested positive for COVID-19 and cancelled her engagements for the week.
  - Heathrow Airport has recorded its busiest January since the start of the pandemic, with 5.4 million passengers passing through during January 2023.
- 17 February – Office for National Statistics data for the week up to 7 February indicates that COVID-19 cases continued to increase in England, Wales and Scotland, but decreased in Northern Ireland. In England, In England it is estimated that 1,054,200 people had COVID-19, equating to 1.88% of the population, or around 1 in 55 people.
- 22 February –
  - Office for National Statistics data collected between February and November 2022 has shown a decrease in the mortality rate among people from ethnic minorities with COVID-19 when compared to the beginning of the pandemic, when mortality was highest among people from the Bangladeshi, Black Caribbean and Pakistani groups.
  - A pub landlord from Billingham, County Durham who had his licence revoked by the local council after repeatedly opening the establishment during the COVID-19 lockdowns, loses a two-year legal battle following a hearing at the High Court in Leeds.
- 23 February –
  - The National Health Service in Wales misses its first post-COVID target for reducing the backlog of outpatients waiting for an appointment, with 75,000 people waiting for a year or more when there should be none.
  - Figures produced by the Office for National Statistics show school absences in England remain above their pre-COVID levels, with 25.1% of pupils regularly absent during the autumn term of 2022 compared to 13.1% in autumn 2019.
- 24 February – Office for National Statistics data for the week up to 14 February indicates COVID-19 cases continued to rise in England, Scotland and Wales, but remained uncertain in Northern Ireland. In England, the estimated number of people testing positive for COVID-19 was 1,223,000 (or 2.18% of the population and around 1 in 45 people).
- 28 February –
  - A letter to Baroness Hallett, the chair of the COVID-19 Inquiry, and co-authored by Covid-19 Bereaved Families for Justice and the Runnymede Foundation, has called for race to be made a central part of the inquiry because of the significantly greater impact the pandemic had on those from ethnic minorities. A spokesperson for the inquiry says that the unequal impact of the pandemic will be at the inquiry's forefront.
  - Pembrokeshire County Council is to discuss whether the establishment of a COVID-19 field hospital at Bluestone National Park Resort near Narberth in 2020 was the right location for the hospital. The hospital was given £6m, but only 30 of its 125 beds were ever available.

=== March 2023 ===
- 1 March – WhatsApp messages leaked to the Daily Telegraph are reported as suggesting former Health Secretary Matt Hancock chose to ignore advise from experts in April 2020 that there should be "testing of all going into care homes". A spokesman for Hancock said "These stolen messages have been doctored to create a false story that Matt rejected clinical advice on care home testing".
- 2 March –
  - The Daily Telegraph publishes more of Matt Hancock's WhatsApp exchanges, this time with former Education Secretary Gavin Williamson in December 2020, when a debate into whether schools should reopen following the Christmas holiday was taking place. The leaked messages suggest Hancock favoured school closures, while Williamson was more hesitant. Hancock, who worked alongside journalist Isabel Oakeshott to co-author a book, describes the release of the messages as a "massive betrayal and breach of trust". In response, Oakeshott says she released the messages because she believed doing so was in the "public interest".
  - Sir Keir Starmer unveils Sue Gray, who led the investigation into the Partygate scandal, as Labour's new Chief of Staff, sparking concern among some Conservative MPs about her impartiality.
  - Lord Bethell, a former health minister with the second Johnson ministry, tells Channel 4 News that the UK government briefly considered asking the public to help exterminate the UK's estimated 10.9 million cats in 2020 amid concerns the animals were responsible for spreading COVID-19.
- 3 March –
  - The latest leaked WhatsApp messages published by the Daily Telegraph appear to show former Health Secretary Matt Hancock and Cabinet Secretary Simon Case joking about locking people in quarantine hotels.
  - The Commons Select Committee of Privileges finds that former Prime Minister Boris Johnson may have misled Parliament over the Partygate scandal after evidence suggested breaches of COVID-19 rules would have been "obvious" to him. In response Johnson says that none of the evidence shows he "knowingly" misled parliament, and that "it is clear from this report that I have not committed any contempt of parliament".
  - Office for National Statistics data for the week up to 21 February indicates that COVID-19 infections were increasing in England and Wales, but decreasing in Northern Ireland, while the situation in Scotland was uncertain. In England, the number of people testing positive for COVID-19 was estimated to be 1,298,600 (roughly 2.31% of the population around 1 in 45).
- 4 March – Leaked WhatsApp messages published by the Daily Telegraph indicate Matt Hancock and his staff deliberated over whether or not he had broken COVID-19 regulations after pictures of him kissing his aide, Gina Coladangelo, were published by The Sun newspaper. In another conversation, the messages show Hancock criticising the Eat Out to Help Out scheme for "causing problems" in areas where there were a nigh number of COVID-19 cases.
- 5 March –
  - News outlets including BBC News, Sky News and The Independent (who have not verified the messages) report that further WhatsApp messages published by The Telegraph appear to show discussions about how and when the government should reveal details of the Kent COVID-19 variant in order to ensure people would comply with the regulations. The news outlets also says Hancock appears to suggest they should "frighten the pants off everyone", while in another conversation, head of the civil service Simon Case suggests the "fear/guilt factor" was an important element of the government's messaging. The Telegraph also reports messages showing ministers and civil servants discussing "[getting] heavy with the police" to enforce lockdown measures with senior police officers being brought into Number 10 to be told to be stricter with the public.
  - Moderna announces Harwell, Oxfordshire as the location of its new Innovation and Technology Centre, a research and development facility which will be built by 2025.
- 6 March – The Telegraph publishes messages that are reported to have been exchanged between Allan Nixon, a parliamentary Advisor and Hancock from November 2020 in which they discuss threatening to cancel projects in MPs constituencies if MPs do not support the local lockdown tiers legislation. It is also reported that as part of a strategy aimed at trying to stop MPs from rebelling against the legislation, party whips compiled a spreadsheet of 95 MPs who disagreed with this policy and the reasons for them disagreeing; these related to lack of parliamentary scrutiny, economic harm, harms to hospital, absence of cost benefit analysis and the policy being "unconservative".
- 7 March – The Joint Committee on Vaccination and Immunisation recommends that everyone over 75, care-home residents and anyone considered to be extremely vulnerable aged five and over will be offered a spring COVID-19 booster vaccine. Vaccinations will begin in March in Scotland, early April in England and Wales, and mid-April in Northern Ireland.
- 8 March – In what is believed to be the first case of its kind in the UK, the widow of a nurse who died as a result of COVID-19 is to sue the National Health Service in Wales. Linda Roberts, the widow of Gareth Roberts, who had Type 2 diabetes, plans the legal action after a coroner found that he died as a result of "industrial disease".
- 9 March –
  - The UK Health Security Agency announces that the COVID-19 Infection Survey run by the Office for National Statistics, which collects results from swabs and blood tests from a sample of households, will be paused from the middle of the month.
  - A study published in the British Medical Journal suggests people's mental health was not adversely affected by the COVID-19 pandemic, and that most people made the best of a bad situation.
- 10 March – Office for National Statistics data for the week ending 28 February indicates COVID-19 cases are rising in Scotland, but the picture is unclear in the rest of the UK. In England, the number of people testing positive for COVID-19 was estimated to be 1,333,400, equating to 2.38% of the population, or around 1 in 40 people. In Scotland, the figure was 128,400, equating to 2.44% of the population or around 1 in 40 people.
- 16 March – Office for National Statistics data for the week ending 7 March (6 March in Scotland) indicates COVID-19 cases are falling in Scotland, but the picture is uncertain in the rest of the UK. In England, the survey suggests that 1,322,000 tested positive for the virus, equating to 2.36% of the population, or around 1 in 40.
- 17 March – The Association of Leading Visitor Attractions has warned that UK visitor attractions continue to be impacted by the COVID-19 pandemic as they experience fewer visitors from overseas. Tourists have returned following the pandemic, but not to pre-COVID levels.
- 21 March –
  - A living memorial to the victims of COVID-19 and key workers who worked through the pandemic is unveiled at Staffordshire's National Memorial Arboretum.
  - Partygate scandal: Former Prime Minister Boris Johnson publishes a 52-page defence of his actions during the COVID-19 pandemic in which he acknowledges Parliament was misled, but says he did not do so intentionally.
- 22 March – Boris Johnson gives evidence to the cross-party Privileges Committee, relating to his conduct during Partygate. He insists that he "did not lie" to the House of Commons and always made statements in good faith.
- 23 March –
  - On the third anniversary of the announcement of the UK's first COVID-19 lockdown, a minute's silence is held at midday to mark the third National Day of Reflection.
  - A permanent memorial to those who died during the pandemic, as well as the era's unsung heroes, is unveiled at Balm Green Gardens, near Sheffield's Barker's Pool.
- 24 March –
  - The final Coronavirus Infections Survey is published by the Office for National Statistics, with data for the week up to 13 March. It shows an increase in COVID-19 cases for England, but an uncertain picture for the rest of the UK. The percentage of cases for the Home Nations are shown as follows: 2.66% in England (1 in 40 people), 2.41% in Wales (1 in 40 people), 1.42% in Northern Ireland (1 in 70 people), and 2.59% in Scotland (1 in 40 people).
  - Research led by the University of Edinburgh suggests one in 50 people in Scotland have had lasting ill-effects after contracting COVID-19.
- 30 March – It is announced that COVID-19 testing in England is to be further scaled back from April. Staff and patients in hospitals will no longer be routinely swab tested for the virus, with staff only tested if they are in contact with immunocompromised patients.
- 31 March – The UK Health Security Agency confirms the NHS COVID-19 contact tracing app will close on 27 April following a decline in its use.

=== April 2023 ===
- 2 April – The Observer reports that British researchers are in the process of developing a system to monitor genetic changes in respiratory viruses that could be used to identify new variants and act as an early warning system for new diseases and future pandemics.
- 3 April – NHS England launches its spring booster campaign, which will see around five million people, including those aged over 75 or classed as clinically vulnerable, receive a COVID-19 booster vaccine.
- 5 April – Travellers arriving in England from China are no longer required to provide a pre-departure negative COVID-19 test.
- 11 April – Figures published by the Office for National Statistics show that COVID-19 is no longer the leading cause of death in England and Wales. The figures show it the sixth major cause of death for 2022, having been the main cause of death for 2020 and 2021.
- 14 April – Data from the Zoe Health Study indicates cases of COVID-19 are at their highest in the north of England, with concern about a new Arcturus variant of the virus.
- 19 April – An inquest into the death of Stephen Wright, a 32-year-old NHS psychologist who died from a blood clot on the brain ten days after receiving the Oxford–AstraZeneca COVID-19 vaccine in January 2021, rules his death occurred as a result of "unintended complications of the vaccine". Wright's wife, Charlotte, is one of several people taking legal action against AstraZeneca, and had wanted the cause of death listed on his death certificate changed.
- 22 April – A study published by Swansea University indicates there was no benefit to clinically vulnerable people from shielding during the COVID-19 pandemic. The study, which compared 117,000 people advised to shield during the pandemic with the rest of Wales's population of three million, shows a higher number of deaths and healthcare usage among those who shielded.
- 24 April –
  - Highlands and Islands Airports Ltd reports that its passenger numbers have almost returned to pre-COVID levels, with 1.5 million people using its 11 airports in 2022–23, compared to 1.6 million in 2019–20.
  - A BBC investigation finds that roughly one third of the £594m that was earmarked for National Tutoring Programme, launched to help children catch up after the pandemic, has gone unspent by the Treasury, with schools forced to make up the shortfall from their own budgets.
- 27 April –
  - The NHS COVID-19 contact tracing app closes following a decline in its use.
  - In a written statement to Parliament, Prime Minister Rishi Sunak confirms that Baroness Heather Hallett, the chair of the UK Covid-19 Inquiry, will sit without a panel, as this will be the "most efficient and swift" way to conduct the investigation.

=== May 2023 ===
- 5 May – The World Health Organization declares that COVID-19 no longer represents a "global health emergency", something regarded as a major step towards ending the pandemic.
- 9 May – The broadcasting regulator, Ofcom, finds the TV channel, GB News, in breach of broadcasting regulations over its October 2021 edition of Mark Steyn's programme in which it was claimed the COVID-19 vaccination programme in the United Kingdom amounted to "mass murder". The regulator finds that GB News did not do enough to protect its viewers from harmful content, and rules that GB News must now attend a meeting with Ofcom.
- 16 May – COVID-19 in Scotland: The rules requiring people to wear face masks in Scottish care homes and healthcare settings come to an end after three years.
- 19 May – COVID-19 in Wales: With the second year of post-pandemic examinations under way, BBC News reports that some measures are still in place in Wales to provide students with additional help as they sit exams. Students also report feeling anxiety over sitting exams, particularly those who achieved qualifications without sitting exams.
- 22 May – Margaret Ferrier loses her appeal against a proposed 30 day ban from the House of Commons over her breach of COVID-19 rules in September 2020.
- 23 May – The Cabinet Office has referred former Prime Minister Boris Johnson to the police following fresh allegations of rule breaches during the COVID-19 pandemic.
- 24 May – The COVID-19 inquiry threatens the UK government with legal action if it does not release the full unredacted versions of former Prime Minister Boris Johnson's WhatsApp messages and diary entries. The Cabinet Office argues in response that some of the information is "unambiguously irrelevant" to the inquiry.
- 30 May – Downing Street rejects accusations of a cover-up over the release of WhatsApp messages and diary entries belonging to Boris Johnson.

=== June 2023 ===
- 1 June – The UK government confirms it will launch a legal challenge over the COVID-19 Inquiry's demand for the unredacted version of Boris Johnson's WhatsApp messages and emails, as the deadline by which the inquiry had demanded access to them expires.
- 2 June – Former Prime Minister Boris Johnson announces he is bypassing the Cabinet Office by directly supplying the COVID-19 inquiry with unredacted copies of some of his WhatsApp messages and emails.
- 6 June –
  - MPs vote to suspend Margaret Ferrier, the MP for Rutherglen and Hamilton West, from the House of Commons for 30 days for breaching COVID-19 regulations, almost certainly triggering a by-election in her constituency.
  - Hugo Keith KC, the COVID-19 inquiry's lead lawyer, warns that shortcomings in evidence provided by some government departments could disrupt the inquiry's progress.
  - Lawyers representing bereaved families at the COVID-19 inquiry have requested access to WhatsApp messages belonging to former First Minister Nicola Sturgeon.
- 13 June – Hearings for the public inquiry into the COVID-19 pandemic begin in central London. The inquiry's lead lawyer says "very little thought" was given to the impact of a national lockdown and that Brexit planning may have occupied too much of the government's time and resources, while a counsel for Covid-19 Bereaved Families for Justice accuses the authorities of being "complacent".
- 14 June – A University of Glasgow study indicates that Scottish universities profited more than expected during the pandemic by "substantially expanding international student numbers".
- 15 June – Partygate: A 13-month investigation by the House of Commons' Privileges Committee concludes that ex-Prime Minister Boris Johnson deliberately misled the house over gatherings during pandemic restrictions at 10 Downing Street and Chequers, and would be suspended for 90 days if still an MP. It states that he deliberately misled the House and the committee, impugned the committee and was "complicit in the campaign of abuse and attempted intimidation of the Committee".
- 16 June – The COVID-19 Inquiry hears how a decade of austerity prior to 2020 left the UK with rising health inequality, and public services that had been "depleted".
- 18 June –
  - Partygate:
    - The Mirror publishes video footage of a party held in December 2020 at Conservative Party Headquarters. Housing Secretary Michael Gove describes the incident as "indefensible".
    - Gove tells Sunday with Laura Kuenssberg that Johnson's 90-day suspension is "not merited" and that he will not vote for it.
- 19 June –
  - Partygate:
    - BBC News reports that it has seen an invitation sent out to 30 people by Ben Mallett, a former aide to Boris Johnson, in which they were invited to "jingle and mingle" at a party held at Conservative Party Headquarters on 14 December 2020, while London was in Tier 2 restrictions.
    - MPs back, by 354 votes to seven, a report finding Boris Johnson deliberately misled the Commons over lockdown parties at Downing Street.
  - UK Covid-19 Inquiry: Former Prime Minister David Cameron tells the COVID-19 inquiry that his government had not focussed on other types of pandemics apart from flu in their planning for future pandemics, and that this was a "mistake".
- 20 June –
  - UK COVID-19 Inquiry:
    - Dame Sally Davies, the former Chief Medical Officer for England between 2010 and 2019, apologises to the families of people who died from COVID after the inquiry hears how the UK did not have enough hospitals and medical personnel to cope with the pandemic when compared to similar countries.
    - Former Chancellor George Osborne rejects the suggestion his austerity programme left the NHS in a "perilous" state before the pandemic.
  - A recall petition opens in the Rutherglen and Hamilton West constituency to determine whether Margaret Ferrier will face a by-election; 10% of eligible voters must sign it to trigger the by-election.
- 21 June –
  - UK COVID-19 Inquiry: Chancellor (and former Health Secretary) Jeremy Hunt appears before the COVID-19 Inquiry, where he says that quarantining people with COVID-19 sooner "might have avoided" the UK's first national lockdown in March 2020.
  - Figures show that a cancelled deal between the UK government and French pharmaceutical company Valneva for a batch of 100 million of their vaccines cost the public purse £358.6m.
  - COVID-19 in Jersey: Jersey announces it is winding down its COVID-19 vaccination programme following advice from the UK's Joint Committee on Vaccination and Immunisation, with appointments bookable until 30 June and final appointments scheduled for July.
  - Ofcom have received 61 complaints about the 18 June edition of GB News's Headliners in which Lewis Schaffer made a string of claims about COVID-19, including that it was not a real virus.
- 22 June – Sir Chris Whitty, the Chief Medical Officer for England, gives evidence to the COVID-19 Inquiry, and describes the lockdown strategy employed during the pandemic as "a very radical thing to do". Whitty also speaks about an incident during which he was accosted in a London park in 2021, and warns that threats to experts could undermine future pandemic planning.
- 26 June – Dame Jenny Harries, chief executive of the UK Health Security Agency, tells the COVID-19 inquiry that austerity measures left public health services "denuded" and placed local health officials under "significant pressure".
- 27 June –
  - Former Health Secretary Matt Hancock appears before the COVID-19 inquiry, where he criticises the UK's pandemic planning, saying it was too focussed on the aftermath of a pandemic rather than preventing one, and that resources were prioritised on planning for the event of a no deal Brexit. Hancock tells the families of those who died of the virus that he is "profoundly sorry" for each death.
  - Virginia Crosbie, the MP for Ynys Môn, apologises for attending a drinks event at Westminster on 8 December 2020 after the Guido Fawkes website reported she was a co-host of the event.
- 28 June – Jeane Freeman, Scotland's former Cabinet Secretary for Health, tells the COVID-19 inquiry that no planning could have prepared Scotland for the pandemic, and that the country came close to running out of PPE.
- 29 June –
  - Nicola Sturgeon, Scotland's former First Minister, tells the COVID-19 inquiry that the UK government's planning for a no deal Brexit hampered her government's planning for the pandemic, and that the 2011 UK Influenza Pandemic Preparedness Strategy, prepared after the 2009 United Kingdom swine flu pandemic, was inadequate. She also tells the inquiry that Scotland and the UK differed in their strategies for dealing with the pandemic, with the Scottish Government focused on preventing the pandemic as opposed to the UK government's strategy of attempting to live with it. But a lack of resources impinged upon things such as contact-tracing and testing capability, something Sturgeon tells the inquiry continues to trouble her.
  - A Local Government Association survey indicates that one in ten councils in England have had councillors stand down from office due to a legal requirement that council meetings should be held in person. The rule was suspended during the pandemic, but reinstated in May 2021.
- 30 June – The High Court hears the UK government's legal challenge to the UK COVID-19 Inquiry's demand for full access to Johnson's diaries and WhatsApp messages.

=== July 2023 ===
- 3 July –
  - Sir Frank Atherton, the Chief Medical Officer for Wales, appears before the COVID-19 Inquiry, and tells the hearing that preparations for a no deal Brexit delayed preparations for a pandemic because resources were moved as the UK prepared to leave the European Union.
  - Data from the UK Health Security Agency suggests there were more flu related deaths than those relating to COVID-19 during the 2022–23 winter season, with just over 14,000 flu related deaths compared to just over 10,000 COVID-19 related deaths.
- 4 July –
  - UK Covid-19 Inquiry: Wales's First Minister Mark Drakeford and former Health Minister Vaughan Gething appear before the inquiry. They tell the hearing that Wales was not prepared to deal with an excess number of deaths, and the Welsh Government was not prepared for the pandemic. Gething also tells the inquiry he did not read the report into Exercise Cygnus, the UK's 2016 pandemic planning exercise.
  - Partygate affair: The Metropolitan Police announces it is reopening its investigation into a lockdown party held at Conservative Party Headquarters in December 2020, as well as an event held at Westminster on 8 December 2020.
- 5 July – Professor Jim McManus, president of the Association of Directors of Public Health (ADPH), tells the COVID-19 inquiry that communication from central government was "lacking" and "unclear" during the pandemic, with local health officials often hearing about policy changes from television news conferences rather than directly from government.
- 6 July –
  - The UK government loses a High Court bid to prevent the COVID-19 Inquiry from seeing Boris Johnson's diaries and WhatsApp messages in full.
  - Senior Welsh civil servant Reg Kilpatrick tells the COVID-19 Inquiry he raised concerns in 2018 that the Welsh Government was not doing enough to assist the UK government with pandemic planning.
  - Robin Swann, Northern Ireland's Health Minister, tells the COVID-19 inquiry that short-term governments in Northern Ireland caused difficulty.
- 8 July – Anna-Louise Marsh-Rees, leader of Covid-19 Bereaved Families Cymru, renews calls for a Wales-specific COVID-19 Inquiry, describing a decision to establish a Senedd Committee as no substitute for an inquiry, and that it "cannot possibly cover the range of issues and get to the level of granularity that we need".
- 10 July –
  - Dr Michael McBride, Northern Ireland's Chief Medical Officer, appears before the COVID-19 Inquiry, and tells the hearing that the absence of ministers at Stormont prior to the pandemic had a "significant impact" on Northern Ireland's preparedness for COVID.
  - At 4.00pm, the deadline passes by which time Boris Johnson's WhatsApp messages must be handed to the COVID-19 Inquiry, although technical problems are later reported to be delaying the process. The problem is later reported to be that Johnson could not remember the passcode, although a record of the PIN is later found.
- 11 July –
  - Arlene Foster, Northern Ireland's former First Minister, gives evidence to the COVID-19 Inquiry, telling the hearing that the UK government should have stepped in to make decisions on preparations for a health emergency in Northern Ireland during the three years it had no functioning government between January 2017 and January 2020.
  - In the Senedd, Wales's First Minister, Mark Drakeford, defends the country's former Health Minister Vaughan Gething for not reading pandemic paperwork until he prepared for the COVID-19 inquiry, but Andrew RT Davies, leader of the Welsh Conservatives questions how there can be confidence in Gething's current job as Economy Minister.
- 12 July – Michelle O'Neill, Northern Ireland's present First Minister, who was deputy during the pandemic, gives evidence to the COVID-19 Inquiry, describing the communication between the Westminster and Stormont governments as not an "easy flow of information", with meetings being "ad-hoc and tick-box".
- 13 July – Michael Gove, the Secretary of State for Levelling Up, appears before the COVID-19 Inquiry, and tells the hearing that preparing for Brexit left the UK "match fit" to deal with the pandemic.
- 14 July – BBC News reports on a June 2021 email sent by actor Martin Compston to Scotland's then Health Secretary, Humza Yousaf, requesting advice on how a co-star of the TV series Line of Duty could get a COVID-19 vaccine.
- 17 July –
  - Gerry Murphy, assistant General Secretary of the Irish Congress of Trade Unions, tells the COVID-19 Inquiry that people from less affluent backgrounds were more likely to be hospitalised during the pandemic. He also tells the inquiry that among this demographic there were more "premature deaths, suicide rates and generally all negative indicators".
  - The Scottish Healthcare Workers Coalition (SHWC) writes to the Scottish Government urging them not to change its guidelines on masks for healthcare workers, claiming there are "very serious flaws" in doing so.
- 18 July – Matthew Fowler, co-founder of Covid-19 Bereaved Families for Justice, tells the COVID-19 Inquiry about the online abuse he received after speaking about the virus following the death of his father from COVID-19 in April 2020. Anna-Louise Marsh-Rees, leader of Covid-19 Bereaved Families Cymru who lost her father during the pandemic, tells the inquiry how he died in hospital "gasping for breath" and how the bodies of those who died from the illness were treated like "toxic waste".
- 20 July – The first phase of the COVID-19 Inquiry comes to an end, with an interim report expected to be published in 2024.
- 21 July – Boris Johnson says that his pre-May 2021 WhatsApp messages have now been downloaded ready for examination by the COVID-19 inquiry.
- 26 July – The Scottish COVID-19 Inquiry begins, with its opening hearing taking place in Dundee.
- 27 July – The UK government confirms that COVID-19-era licensing rules in England allowing pubs to sell takeaway drinks will end on 30 September.
- 29 July – Data produced by the Zoe Health Study indicates that 789,695 people are estimated to have symptomatic COVID in the UK, with cases highest in south west England and lowest in the Yorkshire and Humber region. Boots have also reported an increase in sales of COVID tests by a third over July. The UK Health Protection Agency says it is monitoring the figures.
- 31 July – The 2023 Rutherglen and Hamilton West recall petition closes. A by-election is triggered after the petition to remove Margaret Ferrier from office is signed by 11,896 of the 81,124 eligible constituents, passing the required 10% threshold.

=== August 2023 ===
- 1 August – An investigation into NHS Lanarkshire by the Information Commissioner's Office finds that staff shared the personal details of patients through an unauthorised WhatsApp group on 500 occasions during the COVID-19 pandemic. Staff were allowed to communicate through WhatsApp during the pandemic, but it was never authorised for communicating patient details, and the health board has apologised.
- 4 August – The husband of a woman who died in March 2021 after receiving her first dose of the AstraZeneca vaccine files a product liability lawsuit against AstraZeneca with the High Court in London.
- 6 August – The UK Health Security Agency reports a new strain of COVID-19, officially named EG.5.1 but also known as the Eris variant, is responsible for one in seven new cases in the UK.
- 8 August – The Joint Committee on Vaccination and Immunisation recommends the Autumn 2023 programme of COVID-19 booster vaccines should be routinely offered to all over-65s, as well as those under 65 in clinical risk groups, care home residents and frontline health workers. This marks a change from 2022 when all adults over 50 were offered the booster. The flu vaccine will also be offered to over 65s after the age was dropped to 50 during the pandemic.
- 10 August – NHS hospital waiting lists in England reached 7.5 million at the end of June 2023, up around 100,000 from the previous month, and up about 3 million since the start of the COVID-19 pandemic.
- 13 August – The UK government decides to retain COVID-19 licensing rules for pubs in England and Wales that allows the sale of takeaway drinks; they had previously been scheduled to expire on 30 September.
- 17 August – A Level results are published in England, Wales and Northern Ireland, with grades returning to pre-pandemic levels; 27.2% of all grades marked are rated as A* or A.
- 18 August –
  - The UK Health Security Agency supports a proposal for the commercial sale of COVID-19 vaccines to the public, for those wishing to top up their immunity, after the age limit on the NHS booster programme is raised from 50 to 65.
  - A new Omicron variant, BA.2.86, or Pirola, is first detected in the UK.
- 21 August – A lawsuit is filed against AstraZeneca at the High Court by a man who was diagnosed with vaccine-induced thrombotic thrombocytopenia following administration of the AstraZeneca COVID-19 vaccine.
- 24 August –
  - A Royal Society report into non-pharmaceutical interventions during the COVID-19 pandemic finds that measures such as face masks and social distancing "unequivocally" helped to prevent the spread of infections.
  - GCSE results are published in England, Wales and Northern Ireland, with 68.2% of all entries marked at grades 4/C and above. It is the second fall in overall results, taking them almost back to pre-pandemic levels.
- 25 August – Thirty families of relatives who died as a result of COVID-19 during the early stages of the pandemic launch legal action against the UK government, care homes and several hospitals over the policy of rapidly discharging patients from hospital into care homes without the requirement for them to isolate.
- 28 August – The Scottish COVID-19 Inquiry, chaired by Lord Brailsford, formally gets under way with preliminary hearings at Edinburgh's Murrayfield Stadium.
- 30 August – England's Autumn 2023 flu vaccination and COVID-19 booster programme is brought forward by a month from October to September, as scientists from the UK Health Security Agency monitor the BA.2.86 variant. Although it is not a variant of concern, it is being monitored due to its high number of mutations.
- 31 August –
  - The first case of the BA.2.86 COVID-19 variant is detected in Scotland.
  - A joint study published by the Universities of Oxford and Leicester involving 1,837 hospital patients suggests that long COVID symptoms such as brain fog and fatigue could be linked to blood clots in the brain or lungs.

=== September 2023 ===
- 1 September – Revised data from the Office for National Statistics for the final three months of 2021 indicate the UK economy grew more strongly following the pandemic than had previously been suggested, with figures showing an 0.6% increase rather than a 1.2% decrease.
- 8 September –
  - The UK Health Security Agency (UKHSA) says there have been 34 confirmed cases of the new BA.2.86 COVID-19 variant, with 28 of those occurring at a care home in Norfolk. There have been no deaths, but the UKHSA says it is too early to draw conclusions over whether it is any more serious than previous variants.
  - The Royal Society for the Prevention of Cruelty to Animals (RSPCA) warns that dogs bought as puppies during lockdown may start to develop behaviour problems as they mature after behaviour issues were found in some dogs bought as companions developed after their owners returned to work and left them alone.
- 9 September – Chris Smith, a virologist from the University of Cambridge, describes the new variant as "not necessarily that alarming" as a result of the vaccination programme.
- 10 September – As the newly discovered BA.2.86 variant (known unofficially as Pirola) continues to spread, Professor Rowland Kao, an infections expert from the University of Edinburgh, calls for lateral flow COVID tests to be made freely available again.
- 11 September – England's Autumn 2023 flu vaccination and COVID-19 booster programme begins, having been brought forward from October due to the BA.2.86 variant. The programme begins with care home residents receiving the booster.
- 18 September –
  - People aged 65 and over in England are invited to book appointments for a COVID-19 booster vaccine.
  - The BBC documentary series State of Chaos is told that senior Whitehall officials raised concerns with Buckingham Palace about Boris Johnson's conduct during the pandemic, and suggested the Queen raise the matter with him during their weekly private audience.
- 25 September – Gatwick Airport announces that around 82 flights will be cancelled over the coming week after members of staff at its air traffic control tower tested positive for COVID-19.
- 27 September – A report by the Education Select Committee draws attention to the increased number of absences from schools in England, which has doubled since the COVID-19 pandemic; data for 2022–23 shows an average of 22.3% of school pupils were absent, compared to between 10% and 12% in the years prior to the pandemic. A combination of mental health issues and the cost of living crisis are attributed to the increase.
- 29 September – Following the publication of a report the previous day into COVID-19 outbreaks at two Northern Ireland hospitals which resulted in a number of deaths, the campaign group Covid-19 Bereaved Families for Justice warns that failures identified in the report still exist.

=== October 2023 ===
- 2 October – As the winter season approaches, Thomas Waite, England's deputy chief medical officer, warns that COVID-19 will "continue to surprise us", saying that it has not yet become a seasonal illness and is therefore less predictable.
- 3 October – The second part of the UK's COVID-19 Inquiry begins, with the decisions made by the Johnson Government during the early days of the pandemic coming under scrutiny. Extracts from the diary of Sir Patrick Vallance, the UK government's former chief scientific adviser, are read to the hearing, and describe how he criticised Boris Johnson for "impossible flip-flopping" and "bipolar decision-making".
- 5 October
  - The COVID-19 Inquiry hears that doctors from ethnic minorities were "less likely to speak up" when given unsuitable personal protective equipment during the pandemic.
  - Moderna hopes to make its COVID-19 vaccine available privately in the UK in 2024, but this would require a change in its licence to allow the vaccine to be given by pharmacies and private clinics.
- 6 October – Anne Longfield, the former Children's Commissioner for England, tells the COVID-19 Inquiry that it was a "terrible mistake" for ministers to reopen pub gardens while schools remained closed, and that in any future emergency schools should be "the last to close and the first to reopen".
- 9 October – A study compiled from 10,171 respondents to a questionnaire indicates that people can experience "long colds" in the same way that people have "long COVID", with some people experiencing prolonged symptoms after an initial infection, but more research is needed.
- 10 October – Former Cabinet Secretary Gus O'Donnell gives evidence to the COVID-19 Inquiry, and tells the hearing that the Partygate scandal has damaged the ability of governments to deal with future health crises.
- 11 October – The COVID-19 Inquiry hears written evidence that former Prime Minister Boris Johnson did not want to hold meetings with the leaders of the UK's devolved governments during the pandemic because he feared it would make the UK appear like a "mini-EU of four nations". Responsibility for doing so was instead delegated to Michael Gove, who at the time held the post of Minister for the Cabinet Office.
- 13 October
  - WhatsApp messages exchanged between senior Downing Street officials during the pandemic are read to the COVID-19 Inquiry, and show Simon Case, Downing Street permanent secretary and later Cabinet Secretary, expressing concern at the influence of Carrie Symonds, who was at the time Boris Johnson's partner.
  - Police confirm that 24 fines will be issued for breaches of COVID-19 rules in regard to a party held at Conservative Party HQ in December 2020 for those involved in Shaun Bailey's campaign to become London Mayor.
- 16 October – Lawyers for Sir Patrick Vallance, the former Chief Scientific Adviser for the United Kingdom, argue that his full diary entries should not be disclosed to the COVID-19 Inquiry as some of them served as a "brain dump" to help protect his mental health.
- 17 October – Epidemiologist Neil Ferguson appears before the COVID-19 Inquiry and tells the hearing there was a "lack of urgency" in government as COVID-19 began to spread.
- 19 October – The COVID-19 Inquiry hears that Dame Angela McLean, the Chief Scientific Officer for the United Kingdom, described Rishi Sunak as "Dr Death, the Chancellor" during a WhatsApp conversation about the Eat Out to Help Out scheme launched in August 2020. The comments, made in September 2020, came at a time of intense debate over the need for social distancing to control the COVID-19 virus.
- 24 October
  - Amber Galbraith, who represents the relatives of care home residents, tells the Scottish COVID-19 Inquiry the residents were like "exhibits in a reptile house" because of COVID restrictions that limited the number of visitors, which had an "unnecessarily disproportionate" impact on care homes.
  - A doctor from Derry, Northern Ireland, who used her position to spread misinformation about the COVID-19 vaccine, has her suspension extended by six months by the General Medical Council.
- 26 October – The Times reports that WhatsApp messages sent by National Clinical Director Jason Leitch cannot be handed to the UK or Scottish COVID-19 inquiries because he deleted them on a daily basis.
- 27 October – Scotland's former Health Secretary Alex Neil calls for an urgent review of the use of WhatsApp by government following revelations that National Clinical Director Jason Leitch deleted messages on a daily basis during the pandemic; he also says that many government ministers did not understand the rules for using the app.
- 29 October – The Sunday Mail reports that WhatsApp messages relating to the COVID-19 pandemic sent by First Minister of Scotland, Nicola Sturgeon, were manually deleted from her phone.
- 30 October –
  - First Minister Humza Yousaf says that allegations he deleted WhatsApp messages relating to the COVID-19 pandemic are "certainly not true".
  - Cabinet Secretary Simon Case gives evidence to the UK COVID-19 Inquiry, and the inquiry hears WhatsApp messages sent by Case during the pandemic in which he described how Prime Minister Boris Johnson "cannot lead" and "changes strategic direction every day". The inquiry also hears from a Downing Street aide that Johnson questioned why the economy was being destroyed "for people who will die anyway soon". The hearing is also told there were no COBRA briefings or notes sent to Johnson about COVID-19 for a ten-day period that coincided with the February 2020 half term school holiday. Martin Reynolds, Johnson's Principal Private Secretary, who sent an email inviting Downing Street staff to a "bring your own booze" party, apologises for doing so. The inquiry is also told that a WhatsApp group established to discuss aspects of the pandemic, and which included Johnson, was set to disappearing messages.
- 31 October –
  - Lee Cain, the former Downing Street Director of Communications, gives evidence at the second phase of the COVID-19 public inquiry. He states: "I don't think there was any clarity of purpose, any really serious outlined plan to deal with Covid at that particular point and I think that was the core failure," and says the pandemic was the "wrong crisis" for Boris Johnson's "skill set".
  - Dominic Cummings, the former Downing Street Director of Communications, also gives evidence to the inquiry, with messages exchanged between himself and Johnson read to the hearing. Asked if he believes that an "orgy of narcissism" existed in Downing Street during that particular time, Cummings replies "Certainly".
  - Scotland's Deputy First Minister, Shona Robison, confirms that Scottish Government will hand 14,000 electronic messages relating to the pandemic to the UK COVID-19 Inquiry.

=== November 2023 ===
- 1 November – Former Deputy Cabinet Secretary Helen MacNamara tells the UK COVID-19 Inquiry that the UK response to the pandemic was harmed by what she describes as a "macho" culture in Downing Street.
- 2 November –
  - Simon Stevens, the former chief executive of NHS England, gives evidence to the UK COVID-19 Inquiry. The inquiry hears from his diary extracts that former Health Secretary Matt Hancock wanted to decide "who should live and die" if the NHS was overwhelmed.
  - A study published in The Lancet and using 3,000 subjects suggests the COVID-19 pandemic may have impacted brain health in people aged over 50, although loneliness, alcohol consumption and stress may also be contributing factors.
- 3 November –
  - Extracts from notes written by former prime minister Boris Johnson are read to the COVID-19 Inquiry. Johnson says it is "very unlikely" the first national lockdown in 2020 could have been avoided with earlier intervention to stop the spread of COVID, but conceded the restrictions could have been avoided, but that the only intervention he could conceive would have done so was either vaccination or drugs.
  - The Liberal Democrats urge the UK government to be transparent about COVID-19 advertising, after Dominic Cummings tells the UK COVID Inquiry that Boris Johnson "bunged" money to friendly newspapers.
- 6 November – The UK COVID-19 Inquiry hears diary extracts from Chief Scientific Adviser Sir Patrick Vallance in which he recounts a January 2021 meeting to discuss the lifting of lockdown restrictions during which former prime minister Boris Johnson referred to the Treasury as the "pro-death squad".
- 7 November –
  - The UK COVID-19 Inquiry hears that Boris Johnson proposed injecting himself with COVID-19 on live television during the early days of the pandemic to prove it did not pose a threat to the public. Lord Lister, a former adviser at 10 Downing Street, describes the suggestion as "unfortunate" and "made in the heat of the moment".
  - Following revelations about the deleting of WhatsApp messages by the Scottish Government, First Minister of Wales, Mark Drakeford (who does not use the app himself), tells the Senedd he cannot guarantee that messages sent by ministers and officials within the Welsh Government, and sought by the UK COVID-19 Inquiry, were not deleted.
- 8 November –
  - Mark Sedwill, who was Cabinet Secretary at the start of the pandemic, apologises to the COVID-19 Inquiry for suggesting people should hold chickenpox parties in order to gain immunity from the virus, but says the comments were made in private and he did not make them public.
  - Justin Tomlinson, a former minister for disabled people, tells the UK COVID-19 Inquiry the government recognised this group was at greater risk from the virus and that work had been done "at pace" to address this. His comments come after the inquiry had previously heard how disabled people felt their views were not properly heard over decisions made during the pandemic.
- 9 November –
  - Former Home Secretary Priti Patel tells the UK COVID-19 Inquiry that £10,000 fines introduced in August 2020 for breaching regulations on large gatherings were too high and not proportionate.
  - Jamie Scott, a father-of-two, who suffered a blood clot that left him with permanent brain damage after receiving the AstraZeneca COVID-19 vaccine in April 2021, is to sue the makers of the vaccine under the Consumer Protection Act.
  - Louise Slorance, whose husband Andrew, a senior civil servant, died after catching COVID-19 while undergoing treatment for cancer in 2020, calls for his laptop to be handed to the Scottish COVID-19 Inquiry as she believes it could contain vital information relating to the pandemic.
  - The Rosalind Franklin Covid Laboratory in Leamington Spa, the UK's first COVID-19 testing "mega lab" which opened in June 2021, is put up for sale by the UK government.
- 16 November –
  - The Department for Education asks the exams regulator, Ofqual, to extend extra support for GCSE students in England for another year as a way to help against the impact of COVID-19 on students taking examinations.
  - Conservative MPs Eleanor Laing and Virginia Crosbie, who were among attendees at a lockdown gathering held at Westminster in December 2020, say they have been told by police they will not be fined over their attendance at the event.
- 20 November – Sir Patrick Vallance, the UK's Chief Scientific Adviser during the COVID-19 pandemic, gives evidence to the UK COVID-19 Inquiry, telling the haring that there was a complete lack of leadership in Autumn 2020 as cases rose again following the summer. Vallance He recalls that Boris Johnson struggled with scientific concepts, and that after a five-hour meeting with him, after the Prime Minister had returned from a distressing Battle of Britain memorial service, he "looked broken – his head in hands a lot." He also recalls that Chief Medical Officer Chris Whitty had concerns about the "indirect harms" of lockdown.
- 21 November – Sir Chris Whitty, England's Chief Medical Officer at the time of the pandemic, gives evidence to the UK COVID-19 inquiry, telling the hearing the March 2020 lockdown was imposed "a bit too late" but that the government had "no good option" as it weighed up the risks to public health.
- 22 November – Professor Jonathan Van-Tam, England's deputy chief medical officer at the time of the pandemic, gives evidence to the UK COVID-19 Inquiry, telling the hearing how he and his family received death threats and were advised by the police to leave their home. Van-Tam tells the inquiry the experience made him think about stepping down from his role, and that it could put off future experts from advising because of the potential implications.
- 23 November – Business Secretary Kemi Badenoch gives evidence to the COVID-19 Inquiry, and tells the hearing that misinformation and a lack of trust made it harder to reach minority groups during the pandemic.
- 27 November – Both Sadiq Khan and Andy Burnham, the respective mayors of London and Greater Manchester, give evidence to the UK COVID-19 Inquiry, and tell the hearing that excluding regional mayors from key meetings during the pandemic harmed the response to the situation.
- 28 November – Former Cabinet Secretary Michael Gove tells the COVID-19 Inquiry it is not correct to say that Johnson was "incapable of making decisions" during the pandemic, saying that introducing lockdown measures was "difficult" and against his "political outlook". Gove goes on to say that the March 2020 and November 2020 restrictions were put in place too late.
- 29 November –
  - After former Health Secretary Sajid Javid tells the COVID-19 Inquiry that Boris Johnson was happy for his special adviser, Dominic Cummings, to make many of the decisions during the early part of the pandemic, former Deputy Prime Minister Dominic Raab rejects the claim.
  - BBC News highlights the stories of children starting school who are unable to speak properly because of the difficulty their parents had accessing speech therapy during the pandemic.
- 30 November – Former Health Secretary Matt Hancock tells the COVID-19 Inquiry that locking down three weeks earlier than the UK did in March 2020 would have saved 90% of the lives lost to COVID-19 during the first wave of the pandemic. He also comments on the "toxic culture" in Downing Street at the time, driven by Dominic Cummings.

=== December 2023 ===
- 1 December – Former Health Secretary Matt Hancock tells the COVID-19 Inquiry that more severe restrictions in January 2021, such as school closures, could have been avoided if the UK government had acted to impose a lockdown earlier in the autumn of 2020. He also suggests that local politicians put "politics over public health".
- 5 December – Rosalind Ranson, who was medical director for the Isle of Man during the pandemic, wins £3.2m following a tribunal hearing in which she described how her boss tried to "break" her for highlighting concerns about how the pandemic was being handled on the island.
- 6 December –
  - Boris Johnson, Prime Minister from 2019 to 2022, appears before the COVID-19 inquiry and is questioned by Hugo Keith, counsel for the inquiry. He apologises for the "pain and the loss and the suffering" people experienced during the pandemic. His comments are interrupted by protesters, who are ordered to leave the inquiry room.
  - A study by the Medical Research Council suggests that mRNA technology in COVID-19 vaccines could be tweaked to stop the body harmlessly misreading the code and utilised in other vaccines.
- 7 December –
  - On the second day of his appearance at the COVID-19 Inquiry, Johnson tells the hearing he did not pursue a "let it rip" strategy during the pandemic, but put forward counter arguments to challenge the consensus at meetings.
  - The Office for National Statistics begins the Winter Coronavirus (COVID-19) Infection Study, which asks people who took part in the earlier ONS Infection Survey to periodically complete surveys and take lateral flow tests.
- 8 December – Police have closed their investigation into potential breaches of COVID rules at a gathering held in Parliament on 8 December 2020, determining that it did not meet the threshold for issuing fines.
- 10 December –
  - Speaking in a YouTube documentary, Conservative peer Baroness Michelle Mone says she "regrets" not being more transparent about her involvement with PPE Medpro, a company contracted to supply personal protective equipment during the pandemic.
  - A report produced by the Centre for Social Justice says that the gap between the UK's "haves and have-nots" is in danger of becoming a "chasm" as it continues to grow, and cites the COVID-19 pandemic as a period when the gap widened.
- 11 December – Prime Minister Rishi Sunak defends his Eat Out to Help Out scheme at the COVID-19 Inquiry, saying the August 2020 initiative prevented "devastating" job losses and was not responsible for a second wave of COVID infections. He also says he is "deeply sorry" to all of those who lost friends and relatives during the pandemic.
- 12 December – The COVID-19 Inquiry hears that WhatsApp messages on devices sent by ministers at Stormont are unavailable because their government-issued electronic devices were reset to factory settings.
- 14 December – A study suggests the pre-pandemic year-on-year decline in smoking in England has almost slowed to a halt. Figures show a 5.2% decrease in 2019, which slowed to 0.3 between April 2020 and August 2022.
- 17 December – Michelle Mone says that, under certain circumstances, she could stand to benefit from some of the profits made by personal protective equipment sold to the UK government during the COVID-19 pandemic by a company run by her husband, Doug Barrowman. The next day, Sunak says the government is taking the issue "incredibly seriously" and is pursuing legal action against PPE Medpro.
- 20 December –
  - JN.1 is reported as a new variant of interest, following a recent, rapid rise in COVID-19 cases.
  - Government documents from July 2020 published by the COVID-19 Inquiry reveal that officials considered targeting specific groups with stronger messaging, identifying "white van man", those from ethnic minorities and young people, who it was perceived had a "reduced fear of the virus".
- 21 December – The Office for National Statistics and the Health Security Agency estimate that around 1 in 24 of the population of England and Scotland were infected with COVID, using data collected in the two weeks up to 13 December. Prevalence was increasing in all age groups and was highest in those aged between 18 and 44.
- 30 December – Figures released by NHS Wales indicate a third of staff absences are due to stress, depression or anxiety, with figures peaking after the COVID-19 pandemic at around 14,500.

== See also ==
- Timeline of the COVID-19 pandemic in the United Kingdom (January–June 2020)
- Timeline of the COVID-19 pandemic in the United Kingdom (July–December 2020)
- Timeline of the COVID-19 pandemic in the United Kingdom (January–June 2021)
- Timeline of the COVID-19 pandemic in the United Kingdom (July–December 2021)
- Timeline of the COVID-19 pandemic in the United Kingdom (January–June 2022)
- Timeline of the COVID-19 pandemic in the United Kingdom (July–December 2022)
- Timeline of the COVID-19 pandemic in the United Kingdom (2024)
- History of the COVID-19 pandemic in the United Kingdom
- COVID-19 vaccination in the United Kingdom
