= COVID-19 inquiry =

COVID-19 inquiry, Coronavirus commission, or related terms may refer to:

- National COVID-19 Commission Advisory Board, in Australia
- COVID-19 CPI, in Brazil
- Dutch parliamentary inquiry into the COVID-19 pandemic, in the Netherlands
- Royal Commission of Inquiry into COVID-19 Lessons Learned, in New Zealand
- Norwegian Covid-19 Commission, in Norway
- Coronakommissionen, in Sweden
- UK COVID-19 Inquiry, in the United Kingdom
  - Scottish COVID-19 Inquiry, in Scotland
- Vatican COVID-19 Commission
