= Timeline of the COVID-19 pandemic in the United Kingdom (2024) =

The following is a timeline of the COVID-19 pandemic in the United Kingdom in 2024.

There are significant differences in the legislation and the reporting between the countries of the UK: England, Scotland, Northern Ireland, and Wales. The numbers of cases and deaths are reported on a government Web site updated daily during the pandemic. The UK-wide COVID Symptom Study based on surveys of four million participants, endorsed by authorities in Scotland and Wales, run by health science company ZOE, and analysed by King's College London researchers, publishes daily estimates of the number of new and total current COVID-19 infections (excluding care homes) in UK regions, without restriction to only laboratory-confirmed cases.

== Events ==
=== January 2024 ===
- 1 January – Writing on X, Doug Barrowman, husband of Baroness Michelle Mone, claims it "suits the agenda" of ministers to "scapegoat" him and his wife as a means of distracting from government "incompetence" at failing to procure personal protective equipment during the COVID-19 pandemic.
- 5 January – The death is announced of lobbyist and political adviser Derek Draper, who became seriously ill with an exceptionally severe case of Long COVID after contracting COVID-19 in 2020.
- 10 January – Baroness Heather Hallett, chair of the UK COVID-19 Inquiry, confirms the inquiry will postpone the start of hearing evidence about the development of a vaccine as more time is needed to prepare for a separate investigation into the impact of COVID-19 on the NHS. Consequently, the vaccine evidence, which was due to begin being heard in Summer 2024 may not begin until after the next general election.
- 11 January – A University of Birmingham study estimates that GP appointments and other primary care consultations generated by long COVID cost the NHS an extra £23m per year.
- 12 January –
  - A report published by the Foreign and Commonwealth Office reveals that the UK government spent £27,000 replenishing its wine cellar between 2020 and 2022, while use of the cellar, situated in Lancaster House, fell by 96% during 2020 because of the COVID-19 pandemic.
  - Surgeons at a plastic surgery unit at Queen Victoria Hospital in East Grinstead, Surrey, have reported a doubling of the number of patients being treated for dog bites since the pandemic, with dog ownership increasing during that time.
- 16 January –
  - Research published in The Lancet suggests that 7,000 hospitalisations from COVID-19 could have been avoided during the summer of 2022 if the population had received the full amount of available vaccinations. The same study shows that 44% of the population were under vaccinated at the time, with the highest rate being among younger people.
  - Scotland's Finance Secretary, Shona Robison, confirms that the Scottish Government is to cut at least 1,200 funded university places as they cannot afford to continue paying for additional places created during the COVID-19 pandemic.
  - Helen Goss, the mother of an eleven-year-old girl from Aberdeenshire with long COVID, launches legal action against NHS Grampian for what she says are the health board's "multiple failings" in the care and treatment of her daughter.
- 19 January – The Scottish COVID-19 Inquiry hears that all of former First Minister Nicola Sturgeon's WhatsApp messages relating to the pandemic appear to have been deleted.
- 20 January – In a post on X (formerly known as Twitter) Nicola Sturgeon says that all messages between her and colleagues communicated "through informal means" were handed to the Scottish COVID-19 Inquiry in 2023.
- 22 January – The UK's COVID-19 Inquiry hears that Professor Gregor Smith, Scotland's Chief Medical Officer, advised colleagues to delete their WhatsApp messages "every day" during the pandemic.
- 23 January – The UK COVID-19 Inquiry hears WhatsApp messages between Professor Jason Leitch, Scotland's National Clinical Director, and Humza Yousaf, who was then Scotland's Health Secretary, discussing exemptions from wearing face coverings at a dinner. Leitch advised Yousaf to have a drink in his hand at all times as a way of remaining exempt, and suggested "literally no-one" followed official guidance on wearing masks when not seated for dinner.
- 24 January –
  - Professor Mark Woolhouse, a member of the Scottish Government COVID-19 Advisory Group, tells the COVID-19 Inquiry that senior members of the Scottish Government "froze" at the beginning of the pandemic, ignoring the advice of experts, and also claims hundreds of people may have died after being told not to "bother" the NHS.
  - A study of children aged 10 and 11 who became overweight or obese during the COVID-19 pandemic warns they could face "lifelong health consequences".
- 25 January –
  - The UK COVID-19 Inquiry hears heated text messages exchanged between Nicola Sturgeon and an aide in which she referred to former Prime Minister Boris Johnson as a "clown" following the announcement of a second lockdown for England in October 2020, and that she was offended by his "utter competence".
  - Responding to evidence given to the COVID-19 Inquiry, Mark Drakeford, the First Minister of Wales, says he did not delete messages during the pandemic, but used "electronic means of communicating... very little".
- 26 January – The UK COVID-19 Inquiry publishes derogatory WhatsApp messages exchanged between present First Minister of Scotland Humza Yousaf and Scotland's National Clinical Director, Professor Jason Leitch during the pandemic, in which they mocked opposition politicians and used expletive language.
- 29 January – Michael Gove gives evidence to the UK COVID-19 Inquiry, and tells the hearing he rejects accusations that the UK government was "playing politics" during the pandemic.
- 30 January –
  - John Swinney, the former Deputy First Minister of Scotland, tells the UK COVID-19 Inquiry that he manually deleted messages sent to Nicola Sturgeon during the pandemic.
  - Mark Drakeford, the First Minister of Wales, says the Welsh Government is willing to talk to the Welsh Rugby Union about the terms of repaying an £18m loan given to it during the pandemic after the WRU asked for "breathing space".
- 31 January – Nicola Sturgeon tells the UK COVID-19 Inquiry that she deleted her WhatsApp messages during the pandemic, but that all "relevant" information has been passed to the Inquiry. She also rejects allegations she presided over a culture of secrecy and used the pandemic to further the cause for Scottish independence.

=== February 2024 ===
- 1 February –
  - COVID-19 vaccination in the United Kingdom: The first private service for COVID-19 vaccination begins rolling out to pharmacies around the UK, allowing those who are under 65 to receive the latest booster.
  - Alister Jack, the Secretary of State for Scotland, tells the UK COVID-19 Inquiry he deleted WhatsApp messages from his phone in November 2021 to free up space, but would have not done so if he could "turn back the clock".
- 2 February – The UK COVID-19 Inquiry hears written evidence that Nicola Sturgeon upgraded her phone to a new device in December 2020, then passed her old phone, which had been used to send messages to colleagues, to a relative.
- 4 February – The Scottish Information Commissioner, which oversees Scotland's freedom of information laws, launches a probe into the Scottish Government's use of informal messaging such as WhatsApp after "significant practice concerns" were raised by the UK COVID-19 Inquiry.
- 10 February – Police Scotland are investigating 22 deaths that occurred at the Fullarton Care Home in Irvine, North Ayrshire during the COVID-19 pandemic. The home was one of the worst affected during the early days of the pandemic.
- 25 February – Speaking ahead of the UK COVID-19 Inquiry's three week session in Wales, Laura McClelland, a senior intensive care doctor, describes the practice of discharging untested patients to care homes during the pandemic as "a form of genocide".
- 27 February – The UK COVID-19 Inquiry begins sitting in Wales, and hears that Health Minister Vaughan Gething deleted WhatsApp messages during the pandemic.
- 28 February – Sally Holland, the former Children's Commissioner for Wales, gives evidence to the COVID-19 Inquiry, and tells the hearing that children's needs were not taken into account during the pandemic, with parks and play areas reopening after pubs, and the closure of schools reminding people that schools are much more than providers of academic learning.
- 29 February – The third day of Welsh hearings for the COVID-19 Inquiry is told that a claim made by First Minister Mark Drakeford that there was "no value" in COVID testing all care home residents was queried by Robert Hoyle, the Welsh Government's Head of Science. The Inquiry also hears that 75% of patients discharged from hospitals into care homes in Wales were not tested for the virus.

=== March 2024 ===
- 1 March – Dr Roland Salmon, the former communicable disease director of Public Health Wales tells the UK COVID-19 Inquiry there was no basis for banning pubs from selling alcohol during the pandemic, and that doing so seemed to be "an overly enduring legacy of the chapel heritage".
- 3 March – The UK's Day of Reflection, first held on 23 March 2021 to coincide with the first anniversary of the first lockdown, moves to its new date of the first Sunday in March, as recommended by the UK Commission on Covid Commemoration.
- 4 March – The COVID-19 Inquiry hears that First Minister of Wales Mark Drakeford described local lockdowns in the autumn of 2020 as a "failed experiment". Rob Orford, the Chief Scientific Adviser to the Welsh Government, also tells the Inquiry that in hindsight "perhaps they weren't the best idea" as they made the situation more "complicated".
- 5 March – Andrew Goodall, who was chief executive of NHS Wales during the pandemic, tells the COVID-19 Inquiry that COVID-19 was not a priority for the Welsh Government during January and February 2020, but that this began to change at the end of February and into March.
- 6 March – As part of the 2024 budget, Chancellor Jeremy Hunt confirms the COVID-19-era government loan scheme for small businesses will be extended until 2026.
- 7 March – Simon Hart, a former Secretary of State for Wales, tells the COVID-19 Inquiry that WhatsApp messages between members of the Welsh Government indicate minister had no idea of their own COVID-19 policy.
- 12 March – Eluned Morgan, who was Wales's health minister during the latter part of the pandemic, tells the COVID-19 Inquiry that people in Wales felt like they were being treated like "second-class citizens" by the UK government, citing the Treasury's decision not to fund furlough payments during Wales's "firebreak lockdown" in Autumn 2020 when furlough payments were provided for a later lockdown in England.
- 13 March – Mark Drakeford, the First Minister of Wales, tells the UK COVID-19 Inquiry that UK government ministers were "afraid of Nicola Sturgeon" during the pandemic, and that her "underlying ambition" for Scottish independence meant she was treated differently to other politicians. He also likens prime minister Boris Johnson to an absent football manager during the pandemic, and accuses him of making comments "designed to minimise the seriousness" of COVID-19 at the very start of the pandemic.
- 19 March – Scottish Prison Service director Allister Purdie gives evidence to the Scottish COVID-19 Inquiry, and apologises to the family of Callum Inglis, who died at Addiewell Prison during the pandemic, after his family learned of the death through word of mouth before they were told formally by prison authorities.
- 20 March – The Scottish COVID-19 Inquiry hears that female nursing staff were regularly supplied with male masks during the pandemic.
- 23 March –
  - On the fourth anniversary of the first national lockdown, kites with the faces of people who died during the pandemic are flown at a memorial service in Bristol.
  - A report compiled by the Resolution Foundation indicates a rise in the number of people leaving work due to long-term health conditions, with the number of people inactive due to long-term health conditions rising from 2.1 million in 2019 to 2.8 million in October 2023, and making it the longest sustained rise since 1994–1998, when records began. The UK is also the only country in the G7 not to return to pre-pandemic employment levels.
- 27 March – A report clears Conservative MP Bernard Jenkin of breaching COVID-19 laws over his attendance at a "wine and nibbles" event on the Parliamentary estate in December 2020, which the report describes as socially-distanced with "business and social elements".
- 28 March – School absence figures for the year ending July 2023 indicate 28.9% of primary school children were persistently absent, meaning they missed at least 10% of lessons, compared to 12.9% for the 2018–19 academic year.

=== April 2024 ===
- 1 April – Testing for COVID-19 is scaled back further in England. People in the highest risk groups can still access free lateral flow tests, and there is still testing of symptomatic staff in certain hospital and hospice roles. All other free provision of lateral flow tests ends.
- 8 April – A study led by Imperial College London suggests that people with long Covid have evidence of continuing inflammation in their blood, which could help understanding of the condition and how it may be treated.
- 15 April – The spring COVID-19 booster vaccine programme begins in England for those aged over 75 or with a weak immune system.
- 30 April – The UK COVID-19 Inquiry begins three weeks of hearings in Belfast. Communications made by Sir David Sterling, the head of the Civil Service in Northern Ireland, are published and describe how he felt ministers were "found wanting" when it came to making important decisions during the pandemic.

=== May 2024 ===
- 1 May – Sir David Sterling gives evidence to the COVID-19 Inquiry, and concedes the Executive Office may have enacted the contingency plan too late.
- 3 May – Notes of the first Northern Ireland Executive meeting to take place following the 2020 funeral of Provisional Irish Republican Army volunteer Bobby Storey, and which were thought to have been lost, are handed to the COVID-19 Inquiry. The funeral caused controversy at the time after it was attended by then deputy First Minister Michelle O'Neill and other Sinn Féin ministers, and faced criticism for being in breach of COVID-19 regulations that restricted the number of people who could gather together at a venue.
- 7 May –
  - It emerges that Vaughan Gething, the First Minister of Wales, who was the country's Health Minister at the time of the pandemic, told colleagues on 17 August 2020, that he was deleting messages from his phone amid concerns they could be captured by the Freedom of Information Act. On 7 May 2024, Gething said that the messages were not deleted to avoid scrutiny as the messages were related to internal Labour matters, not Covid policy.
  - Northern Ireland's Economy Minister, Conor Murphy, tells the COVID-19 Inquiry he will not be appearing before the hearing "on medical advice".
- 8 May – AstraZeneca announces the withdrawal of the Oxford–AstraZeneca COVID-19 vaccine after three billion doses were manufactured and administered since its development in 2020. AstraZeneca cites commercial reason for its withdrawal, and says it has also been superseded by other vaccines that target specific COVID variants.
- 9 May – Stormont speaker Edwin Poots gives evidence to the COVID-19 Inquiry, where he recalls the death of his father from the disease early in the pandemic.
- 13 May – Northern Ireland's Health Minister, Robin Swann, gives evidence to the COVID-19 Inquiry, telling the hearing that Executive meetings which took place in November 2020 were the "lowest days" of his political career as DUP ministers attempted to block restrictions and details of proceedings were leaked to the press.
- 14 May –
  - First Minister of Northern Ireland Michelle O'Neill apologises at the COVID-19 Inquiry for attending the funeral of former Sinn Féin chairman Bobby Storey.
  - Notes appertaining to the first Executive meeting following the Bobby Storey funeral, previously thought missing, are published.
- 15 May –
  - Former Northern Ireland First Minister Arlene Foster gives evidence to the COVID-19 Inquiry, and tells the hearing that she rejects suggestions the Northern Ireland Executive "sleepwalked" into the pandemic.
  - A raft of WhatsApp messages exchanged by members of the Democratic Unionist Party during the pandemic are published by the inquiry, and show how DUP ministers made jibes about other ministers in the Executive.
- 23 May – Simon Case, the Cabinet Secretary, gives evidence to the COVID-19 Inquiry, and tells the hearing that WhatsApp messages criticising Boris Johnson and Downing Street colleagues were "raw, in-the-moment" expressions and not the reality of the government's pandemic response.

=== June 2024 ===
- 12 June – Dr Anne McCloskey, an independent general election candidate for Foyle, is sentenced to 14 days in prison for non-payment of a COVID-19 related fine by Derry Magistrates.
- 25 June – BBC News reports that £1.4bn of personal protective equipment (PPE) provided to the NHS by Full Support Healthcare has been destroyed in what is believed to be the most wasteful deal of the pandemic.
- 30 June – BBC News reports that one in 25,000 people had COVID-19 on 26 June, while hospitalisations from the illness stood at 3.31 in every 100,000 on 16 June, a slight increase from 2.87 per 100,000 the previous week. The article also notes that data is no longer collected in the same way it was at the height of the pandemic. It also mentions a series of new variants that have emerged in recent months and that have been given the name FLiRT, among them the JN1 variant and the KP2 variant.

=== July 2024 ===
- 6 July – The number of COVID-19 hospital cases in Scotland have surpassed the previous winter's peak, data shows, with 448 people in hospital with the disease in the week ending 30 June, an increase on the previous week, and above the winter peak of 388.
- 10 July – A case brought by students of University College London against the university over the quality of teaching during the COVID-19 pandemic and strikes is to go to a trial phase in 2026.
- 11 July – Data from Public Health Scotland indicates there were 49 COVID-related deaths in Scotland during the week ending 1 July, with numbers having increased on previous weeks, while data obtained by BBC News indicates that as many as 260,000 people in at risk groups had not received a booster vaccine during the Spring 2024 programme when it ended on 30 June.
- 15 July – An industrial tribunal orders Kevin Davies to pay more than £26,000 to a female employee for deliberately coughing in her face during the pandemic.
- 17 July – Leaked text messages exchanged between Welsh Government ministers during the COVID-19 pandemic are handed to the UK COVID-19 Inquiry.
- 18 July – The first report in to the COVID-19 pandemic identifies significant flaws in the UK's pandemic planning strategy which led to a higher number of deaths and a greater economic cost. The report says that preparations were made for a mild pandemic, which led to the use of untested lockdowns. Groupthink among scientists and the government's failure to challenge them is also blamed.
- 21 July –
  - Former Chancellor Jeremy Hunt, who was Health Secretary for a number of years before the COVID-19 pandemic, apologises "unreservedly" to the families of people who died from the illness after a report prepared by the COVID-19 Inquiry found significant flaws in the government's strategy for dealing with the pandemic.
  - Data from Public Health Scotland for the week ending 14 July indicates there were 1,130 cases of COVID-19 in Scotland, but the health body believes cases may have peaked.

=== August 2024 ===
- 2 August – Details are published of the autumn programme of COVID-19 vaccination, which will be broadly the same as 2023 with the vaccine offered to all adults aged 65 and over, as well as certain health and social care staff, older care home residents and people in clinical risk groups.
- 14 August – A report published by NHS Wales says that ageing hospitals and delays in discharging people from hospital during the COVID-19 pandemic meant the health service struggled to control the spread of the virus.
- 31 August – Newry Pride returns for the first time since 2019, having experienced a five-year hiatus due to a lack of funding and resources, and the COVID-19 pandemic.

=== September 2024 ===
- 6 September – Sir Van Morrison settles his libel case with former health minister Robin Swann after Morrison described Swann as "very dangerous" at a gig in June 2021 following the cancellation of several of his concerts during the COVID-19 pandemic.
- 9 September – The third stage of the UK COVID-19 Inquiry opens, and begins by looking at healthcare. The hearing is told the NHS was "creaking at the seams" at the start of the pandemic and this undermined the quality of healthcare that was given.
- 13 September – The Why Not Bar in Aberystwyth, Ceredigion, wins a legal case at the Court of Appeal in an ongoing £1.5m insurance case for compensation over losses when it was forced to close in March 2020 as a result of the COVID-19 pandemic.
- 17 September – Dame Ruth May, England's former Chief Nursing Officer, gives evidence to the COVID-19 Inquiry, and tells the hearing nurses bore the brunt of the pandemic because of low staffing levels and difficulty accessing protective equipment.
- 19 September – Professor Susan Hopkins, chief medical adviser at the UK Health Security Agency, gives evidence to the COVID-19 Inquiry, and tells the hearing there was "weak evidence" that high grade face masks offered better protection to health workers.
- 24 September – Dr Michael McBride, Northern Ireland's Chief Medical Officer, gives evidence to the COVID-19 Inquiry, and argues that shielding should be kept in reserve as a public health measure in any future pandemic.
- 30 September – The COVID-19 Inquiry hears that border closures between Northern Ireland and the Irish Republic caused problems for staff and patients at Altnagelvin Hospital in Derry, which is close to the border.

=== October 2024 ===
- 3 October – In a letter to the exam regulator Ofqual, Education Secretary Bridget Phillipson advises that GCSE students in England should continue to receive post-Covid help in the form of formula and equation sheets during exams. The arrangement was previously scheduled to end in 2024.
- 10 October – Professor Jonathan Wyllie, the former president of Resuscitation Council UK, tells the COVID-19 Inquiry that at least one NHS trust put in place a blanket "do not resuscitate" order for sick patients during the pandemic, with people considered ineligible for CPR on the grounds of age or disability rather than individual assessment.

=== November 2024 ===
- 7 November – Professor Sir Stephen Powis, the most senior doctor in NHS England, tells the COVID-19 Inquiry he was "personally terrified" that hospitals could have been overwhelmed in the early stages of the pandemic.
- 11 November – Amanda Pritchard, the chief executive of NHS England, tells the COVID-19 Inquiry that the Johnson government rejected a request for funding for an extra 10,000 beds at the height of the pandemic.
- 18 November – Robin Swann, Northern Ireland's former health minister during the pandemic, tells the COVID-19 Inquiry there was no blanket "do-not-resuscitate" order in place for sick patients in Northern Ireland.
- 21 November – Former Health Secretary Matt Hancock tells the COVID-19 Inquiry that at one point during the pandemic the NHS in England came within "six or seven hours" of running out of personal protective equipment (PPE).
- 30 November – Dr Sharon George, a chemist and former senior lecturer in environmental sustainability, suggests that powerful odours from the Walleys Quarry landfill site in Silverdale, Staffordshire, may be linked to people doing more DIY during the COVID-19 pandemic.

=== December 2024 ===
- 4 December –
  - The National Crime Agency uncovers evidence that UK drug gangs were using Russian criminals to help launder money during the pandemic.
  - Former prime minister Boris Johnson accuses Starmer of misleading the House of Commons. This follows an exchange in the House during PMQs when Starmer, answering a question from the leader of the opposition, Kemi Badenoch, said that "two of her predecessors had convictions for breaking the Covid rules". Although the former Conservative prime ministers, Johnson and Rishi Sunak, had received fixed penalty notices for breaking Covid-19 regulations, neither had any criminal convictions.

== See also ==
- Timeline of the COVID-19 pandemic in the United Kingdom (January–June 2020)
- Timeline of the COVID-19 pandemic in the United Kingdom (July–December 2020)
- Timeline of the COVID-19 pandemic in the United Kingdom (January–June 2021)
- Timeline of the COVID-19 pandemic in the United Kingdom (July–December 2021)
- Timeline of the COVID-19 pandemic in the United Kingdom (January–June 2022)
- Timeline of the COVID-19 pandemic in the United Kingdom (July–December 2022)
- Timeline of the COVID-19 pandemic in the United Kingdom (2023)
- History of the COVID-19 pandemic in the United Kingdom
- COVID-19 vaccination in the United Kingdom
