= Covid-19 Bereaved Families for Justice =

British pressure group

Covid-19 Bereaved Families for Justice (also known as Covid-19 Bereaved Families for Justice UK) is a pressure group of over 4,000 relatives of people who have died during the COVID-19 pandemic in the United Kingdom. The group created the National Covid Memorial Wall and runs a support group on Facebook. They called for a statutory public inquiry into the UK government's handling of the pandemic. On 12 May 2021, then-prime minister Boris Johnson announced that the UK Covid-19 Inquiry would begin in Spring 2022.

== Formation ==
The group was formed in May 2020 by 30 families opposed to the United Kingdom's COVID-19 response.

== Inquiry calls ==
The group called for a judge-led statutory public inquiry into the pandemic and the government's response to it, with a rapid review phase. A statutory public inquiry has the power to subpoena people and take evidence under oath.

The group also threatened litigation to force ministers into an inquiry, including a pre-action letter of judicial review by the High Court of Justice, as they argue that the government "serially failed to take reasonable steps to minimise the effects of the pandemic, leading to massive, unnecessary loss of life". They have dismissed claims by Prime Minister Boris Johnson that ministers "did everything [they] could ... to minimise loss of life and to minimise suffering" as "an insult to the memory of everyone we have lost and a kick in the teeth for bereaved families who deserve acknowledgement that our loved ones were failed". Lawyers representing the group have acted in major public inquiries including into the Hillsborough, Grenfell Tower and Manchester Arena disasters.

The proposed inquiry would include an analysis of: the test, track and trace system, communication of infection control measures and implementation of lockdown measures, attempts to redress the disproportionate impact of COVID-19 on ethnic minorities (specifically Black and South Asian people), as well as a review of the functioning of the National Health Service and its staff during the pandemic − including supplies of personal protective equipment, the transfer of patients from hospitals to care homes, risk assessments (including failures to respond to warnings in 2017's Exercise Cygnus, which reported that the UK was not prepared for a pandemic), isolation and staff testing – and the functioning of 111 services.

On 12 May 2021, Boris Johnson announced that the UK Covid-19 Inquiry would begin in Spring 2022.

== Meeting with officials ==
The group's representatives have met with Labour leader Keir Starmer, and provided evidence to Amnesty International on COVID-19 care home deaths. In meeting with Scottish First Minister Nicola Sturgeon, Sturgeon said that she would support a UK-wide public inquiry into the handling of the pandemic, or failing that an inquiry into Scotland's handling of the pandemic; however, she did not commit to a date.

=== Proposed meeting with the prime minister ===
In 2020, the British government said the then-British prime minister Boris Johnson would not meet with the group as it was currently in litigation with the government. The group disputed this, arguing their pre-action letter for a judicial review did not mean that they were in litigation.

Johnson was invited by the group to meet families of the bereaved seven times, all of which were rejected; however, he visited the National Covid Memorial Wall, which was built by the group, for "quiet reflection" without meeting bereaved families, which a co-founder of the group said was a "a late evening visit under cover of darkness" and "a cynical and insincere move that is deeply hurtful".

Following reports of Johnson allegedly saying "let the bodies pile high" in response to a planned third lockdown, the group accused him of "flippancy" and "callous comments [which] will have caused untold hurt to hundreds of thousands". The group argues that, regardless of the veracity of the quoted comments, COVID-19 lockdowns were "needlessly delayed" for political purposes.

== See also ==
- COVID-19 contracts in the United Kingdom
- Statistics of the COVID-19 pandemic in the United Kingdom
