= Randstad Education =

British education recruitment consultancy

- Type: Limited
- Industry: Recruitment
- Founded: 1993 as Select Education, acquired by Randstad 2010
- Headquarters: Luton, United Kingdom
- Number of locations: 19 in the UK
- Key people: Patrick Malony (MD), John Dunn (Marketing and Business Development Director), Lee Smith (COO)
- Products: Employment agencies, human resources services
- Number of employees: 170
- Website: www.randstadeducation.co.uk

Randstad Education is the largest recruitment consultancy in the education sector in the United Kingdom. It was formed in January 2010 after the acquisition of Select Education, founded in 1993, by the multinational Human Resources group Randstad Holding.

== Overview ==
The company specializes in providing qualified Supply Teachers to primary and secondary education, as well as special needs, early years, and further education. Randstad Education also works with other members of the teaching profession, including newly qualified teachers, Further Education Lecturers and Heads of school. Randstad Education has 19 offices in the UK and is based in Luton.

== History ==
Select Education was founded in 1993 as a specialist provider of supply teachers to schools, opening offices in Edgware, Birmingham, Bristol, Leicester and Manchester a year later. In 1995 it began operating at a profit, and continued to expand over the following years with more offices opening in the UK. The company quickly became the market leader. During this expansion period, Select launched several divisions and subsidiaries at home and abroad. This culminated in launching the Verb Group of companies in 2007, with six members. The Verb Group was then sold to Randstad Holding between 2008 and 2009, being officially rebranded and relaunched in early 2010.

== Accreditations ==
- In February 2010, the DCSF awarded Randstad Education its Quality Mark after all 38 branches achieved 100% grades. The report called the company 'a credit to the reputation of the industry'.
- Randstad Education is also a member of Investors in People, the ISO standard and the Recruitment and Employment Confederation.

== Philanthropy ==
Randstad Education works with a number of charities and organisations, namely:

- Barnardo's, a British charity that aims to care for vulnerable youths.
- Chickenshed, a London-based theatre company that frequently works with children.
- The National Association for Gifted Children, a charity that helps high-achievers.
- Voluntary Service Overseas, which aims to spread international equality and help.
- The Campaign for Learning, which aims to promote learning as a social activity.

== See also ==
- SThree
- Whatjobs
