= Statistics of the COVID-19 pandemic in the United Kingdom =

Statistics article

This article presents official statistics gathered during the COVID-19 pandemic in the United Kingdom.

The official daily report from the Department of Health and Social Care (DHSC) counts those who died within 28 days of testing positive for coronavirus. It "could be the major cause, a contributory factor or simply present when they are dying of something else". From 29 April 2020, the official figures include all coronavirus-positive deaths in the UK, wherever they happened. Before then, the official daily toll included only hospital deaths in England, but included all coronavirus-positive deaths in the rest of the UK wherever they happened, if known to public health agencies. There may be a delay between a death and it entering official statistics so families can be informed; this delay is usually a few days, but can be longer.

The Office for National Statistics (ONS) issues a weekly report covering the four countries, which counts all deaths where coronavirus was mentioned on the death certificate; not necessarily as the main cause of death. As of 21 September 2021, the total of registered deaths mentioning COVID-19 up till 10 September was 160,374, comprising 146,380 deaths for England, 8,129 for Wales, 10,688 for Scotland and 3,306 for Northern Ireland. In addition 184 non-UK residents died in England and Wales. This incorporates data from the National Records of Scotland and Northern Ireland Statistics and Research Agency. This figure is higher because it also counts deaths where no test was done. The ONS has analysed death certificates for England and Wales to the end of 2020 and shown that 91% of deaths which mention COVID-19 state this as the main cause of death (compared with 18% for flu and pneumonia). The end of free mass testing in April 2022 greatly reduced the number of tests taken and may affect the number of cases, although ONS statistics have continued being collected.

== Details ==
As of 5 June 2020 the death rate across the UK from COVID-19 was 592 per million population. The death rate varied greatly by age and healthiness. More than 90% of deaths were among the most vulnerable: those with underlying illnesses and the over-60s. COVID-19 deaths are "remarkably uncommon" among the least vulnerable: those under 65 and with no underlying illnesses.

There was also large regional variation in the pandemic's severity. The outbreak in London had the highest number and highest rate of infections. England was the UK country with the highest recorded death rate per capita, followed by Wales and then Scotland, while Northern Ireland has the lowest per capita.

On 22 April 2020, the Financial Times estimated that 41,000 may have died by that date, by extrapolating the ONS data and counting all deaths above the average for the time of year. The World Health Organisation cautioned on 23 April that up to half of coronavirus deaths in Europe were among care home residents. The Chief Medical Officer for England warned that even the ONS figures on coronavirus deaths in care homes are likely to be "an underestimate" and said he is "sure we will see a high mortality rate sadly in care homes, because this is a very, very vulnerable group". On 28 April, Health Secretary Matt Hancock said the number of coronavirus-linked deaths in care homes would be announced as part of the daily report, instead of weekly. By 7 May 2020, the epidemic was concentrated in hospitals and care homes, with the infection rate being higher in care homes than in the community. By 28 May, the Financial Times estimate of 'excess deaths', the increase over the figure expected for the time of year, had increased to 59,537 since 20 March.

The Guardian wrote in May 2020 that across the UK around 8,000 more people had died in their homes since the start of the pandemic, when compared to normal times. Of that total around 80% of the people according to their death certificates, died from non COVID-19 illnesses. The statistics additionally showed a drop in non COVID-19 deaths in hospitals, leading many to think that people who normally would have been admitted were avoiding hospitals. NHS England said that between 10 and 20% of people who were admitted to hospital for other reasons contracted coronavirus during their stay.

The number of cases in the table represent laboratory confirmed cases only. The UK Government's Chief Scientific Adviser Patrick Vallance, says it is likely that other cases are not included in these figures.

In the week ending 19 June 2020, registered deaths fell below the average for the previous five years for the first time since mid-March. The total number of excess deaths in the UK since the start of the outbreak is just over 65,000.

On 12 August 2020, the UK death toll was reduced by more than 5,000, after a review of how deaths are counted in England.

In the latter half of August, testing increased from 2.3 to 2.6 tests per thousand population per day.

2,460 new cases in the UK were reported on Tuesday 8 September 2020. This number was approximately double what it had been a fortnight previously and the daily case number further doubled to 4,926 a fortnight later, on 22 September 2020. On 18 September, the COVID Symptom Study estimated the $R_0$ value to be above 1 in each of England, Scotland and Wales, with a value of 1.4 for England meaning that cases were doubling every seven days.

Graphs of COVID-19 cases and deaths in the UK
Graph showing the number of COVID-19 cases and deaths in the United Kingdom, logarithmic scale on y-axis

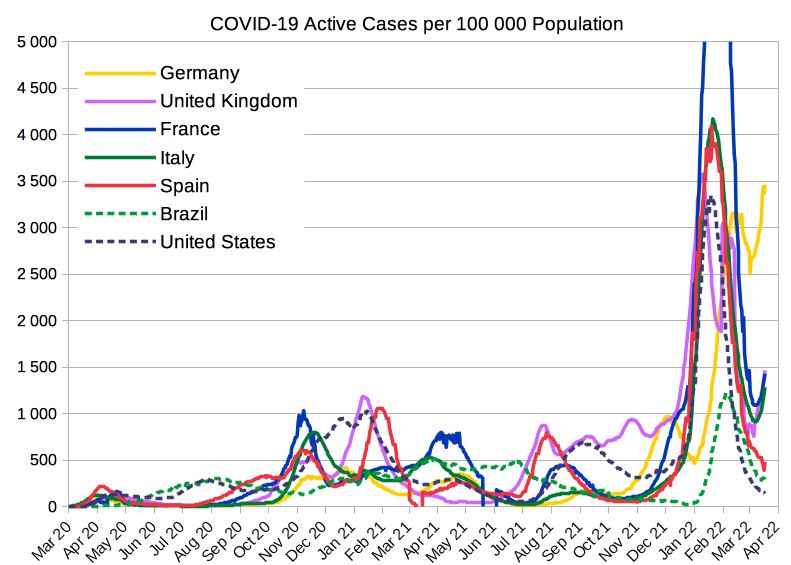
Graph comparing active UK cases to the most affected countries, per 100,000 population

Graph of weekly England and Wales death data from the Office for National Statistics including COVID-19 deaths

== Total cases and deaths ==
=== Long Covid ===
Roughly 1.3 million UK people have "long Covid", symptoms lasting over four weeks following initial infection, according to an Office for National Statistics survey.

The ONS survey, during four weeks in November and December 2021, claims, of those with long Covid:

- "51% have fatigue
- 37% have loss of smell
- 36% have shortness of breath
- 28% have difficulty concentrating"

As with previous analyses, roughly 20% said "their symptoms meant their ability to do day-to-day activities had been limited a lot."

And patients most likely to develop long Covid are:

- "women
- 35- to 69-year-olds
- people with underlying conditions
- those working in health, social care and education"

Dr David Strain of the University of Exeter said, "The stark warning here is that, based on this, in the previous waves, over 800,000 people have their day-to-day activities significantly affected over three months after catching Covid and nearly a quarter of a million report this has a dramatic impact on their quality of life. As we continue to see case numbers of Omicron rise, we must be wary that our reliance purely on hospitalisations and death as a measure of the risk from Covid could grossly underestimate the public-health impact of our current Covid strategy."

== New cases ==
=== New cases by day reported ===
==== Details of the periods with corrected case numbers ====
On 3 October, the UK Government Dashboard "GOV.UKCoronavirus (COVID-19) in the UK" issued the following note:

Due to a technical issue, which has now been resolved, there has been a delay in publishing a number of COVID-19 cases to the dashboard in England. This means the total reported over the coming days will include some additional cases from the period between 24 September and 1 October, increasing the number of cases reported.

On 4 October, the UK Government Dashboard "GOV.UKCoronavirus (COVID-19) in the UK" issued the following note:

An issue was identified overnight on Friday 2 October in the automated process that transfers positive cases data to PHE. It has now been resolved. The cases by publish date for 3 and 4 October include 15,841 additional cases with specimen dates between 25 September and 2 October — they are therefore artificially high for England and the UK.

After correction as calculated by the BBC, the case numbers should read from 25 September as below, showing a trend (apart from the 28 September and 4 October figures) which is subsequently maintained:

Date	25-Sep	26-Sep	27-Sep	28-Sep	29-Sep	30-Sep	1-Oct	2-Oct	3-Oct	4-Oct	5-Oct	6-Oct
Original	6874	6042	5693	4044	7143	7108	6914	6968	12872	22961	12594	14542
Adjustment	957	744	757	0	1415	3049	4133	4786	0	-15841	0	0
Adjusted Total	7831	6786	6450	4044	8558	10157	11047	11754	12872	7120	12594	14542

On 16 December Public Health Wales announced that there had been a delay in transferring data from the Lighthouse Labs which had resulted in under-reporting over the preceding week of approximately 11,000 positive tests. The 'missing' numbers were reported instead on 16 December. While the Wales numbers were a relatively small proportion of the UK total, this nevertheless affected the day-to-day accuracy of the case numbers in this period, though not the cumulative totals afterwards: the affected dates are marked in the graph above with a letter 'x'.

== Numbers of deaths ==
=== Daily deaths within 28 days of positive test, listed by date reported ===
Deaths within 28 days of positive test by date reported, March - October 2020
Date	England (Note: Data on COVID-19 associated deaths in England are produced by Public Health England (PHE) from multiple sources linked to confirmed case data. Deaths newly reported each day cover the 24 hours up to 5pm on the previous day. Deaths are only included if the deceased had had a positive test for COVID-19 and died within 28 days of the first positive test.)	Northern Ireland (Note: Data for Northern Ireland include all cases reported to the Public Health Agency (PHA) where the deceased had a positive test for COVID-19 and died within 28 days. PHA sources include reports by healthcare workers (eg Health and Social Care Trusts, GPs) and information from local laboratory reports. Deaths reported against each date cover the 24 hours up to 9:30am on the same day.)	Scotland (Note: Data for Scotland include deaths in all settings which have been registered with National Records of Scotland (NRS) where a laboratory confirmed report of COVID-19 in the 28 days prior to death exists. Deaths reported against each date cover the 24 hours up to 9:30am on the same day.)	Wales (Note: Data for Wales include reports to Public Health Wales of deaths of hospitalised patients in Welsh Hospitals or care home residents where COVID-19 has been confirmed with a positive laboratory test and the clinician suspects this was a causative factor in the death. The figures do not include individuals who may have died from COVID-19 but who were not confirmed by laboratory testing, those who died in other settings, or Welsh residents who died outside of Wales. Deaths reported each day cover the 24 hours up to 5pm on the previous day. The majority of deaths included occur within 28 days of a positive test result.)	United Kingdom
6 Mar	1	0	0	0	1
7 Mar	1	0	0	0	1
8 Mar	0	0	0	0	0
9 Mar	1	0	0	0	1
10 Mar	4	0	0	0	4
11 Mar	0	0	0	0	0
12 Mar	2	0	0	0	2
13 Mar	1	0	0	0	1
14 Mar	18	0	0	0	18
15 Mar	14	0	0	0	14
16 Mar	22	0	0	0	22
17 Mar	15	0	1	0	16
18 Mar	33	0	1	0	34
19 Mar	42	0	3	0	45
20 Mar	32	0	0	0	32
21 Mar	54	1	1	2	58
22 Mar	24	0	3	9	36
23 Mar	67	1	4	4	76
24 Mar	143	2	2	1	148
25 Mar	178	2	6	5	191
26 Mar	169	3	3	6	181
27 Mar	271	3	8	6	288
28 Mar	279	2	7	4	292
29 Mar	195	6	1	10	212
30 Mar	353	1	6	14	374
31 Mar	368	6	22	7	403
1 Apr	613	2	28	29	672
2 Apr	603	6	29	19	657
3 Apr	654	12	46	24	736
4 Apr	689	8	46	13	756
5 Apr	578	7	2	12	599
6 Apr	531	7	2	27	567
7 Apr	1009	3	74	19	1105
8 Apr	922	5	70	33	1030
9 Apr	990	4	81	41	1116
10 Apr	1035	10	48	29	1122
11 Apr	745	15	47	36	843
12 Apr	604	11	24	18	657
13 Apr	694	6	9	15	724
14 Apr	1007	10	40	19	1076
15 Apr	730	6	84	60	880
16 Apr	906	18	80	32	1036
17 Apr	826	18	58	11	913
18 Apr	1004	17	56	28	1105
19 Apr	380	1	10	41	432
20 Apr	536	13	12	9	570
21 Apr	1116	13	70	25	1224
22 Apr	725	30	77	15	847
23 Apr	594	13	58	17	682
24 Apr	821	15	64	110	1010
25 Apr	729	16	47	23	815
26 Apr	327	5	18	14	364
27 Apr	289	10	13	8	320
28 Apr	862	20	70	17	969
29 Apr	604	9	83	73	769
30 Apr	543	9	60	22	634
1 May	623	18	40	17	698
2 May	485	11	44	44	584
3 May	222	5	12	14	253
4 May	247	6	5	14	272
5 May	639	17	44	26	726
6 May	529	14	83	21	647
7 May	377	4	59	18	458
8 May	498	4	49	28	579
9 May	226	4	36	9	275
10 May	190	5	10	12	217
11 May	174	3	5	5	187
12 May	539	9	50	16	614
13 May	362	2	61	22	447
14 May	303	5	34	10	352
15 May	280	15	46	9	350
16 May	348	4	41	18	411
17 May	43	3	9	12	67
18 May	134	6	2	4	146
19 May	447	7	29	17	500
20 May	259	5	50	14	328
21 May	220	7	37	9	273
22 May	257	3	24	7	291
23 May	197	1	16	6	220
24 May	362	1	9	7	379
25 May	86	8	3	7	104
26 May	105	0	18	8	131
27 May	396	2	13	11	422
28 May	315	2	12	14	343
29 May	246	3	15	10	274
30 May	117	1	22	14	154
31 May	39	1	9	11	60
1 Jun	79	1	1	5	86
2 Jun	228	2	12	7	249
3 Jun	218	8	11	17	254
4 Jun	112	1	9	8	130
5 Jun	239	1	14	4	258
6 Jun	126	1	6	10	143
7 Jun	49	0	0	5	54
8 Jun	44	0	0	3	47
9 Jun	179	0	7	9	195
10 Jun	143	0	12	9	164
11 Jun	64	1	5	6	76
12 Jun	117	1	3	10	131
13 Jun	94	2	5	6	107
14 Jun	23	0	1	3	27
15 Jun	25	0	0	4	29
16 Jun	106	1	5	8	120
17 Jun	90	1	9	10	110
18 Jun	60	0	2	5	67
19 Jun	73	1	6	4	84
20 Jun	67	1	2	1	71
21 Jun	30	0	0	1	31
22 Jun	13	0	0	1	14
23 Jun	84	1	4	5	94
24 Jun	74	1	4	8	87
25 Jun	91	0	2	6	99
26 Jun	76	1	0	2	79
27 Jun	34	1	0	5	40
28 Jun	28	1	0	2	31
29 Jun	17	1	0	3	21
30 Jun	47	0	3	3	53
1 Jul	90	0	1	6	97
2 Jul	31	1	1	8	41
3 Jul	45	2	1	2	50
4 Jul	27	0	0	5	32
5 Jul	18	0	0	1	19
6 Jul	11	0	0	0	11
7 Jul	50	0	1	3	54
8 Jul	52	0	1	4	57
9 Jul	29	0	0	2	31
10 Jul	34	0	0	0	34
11 Jul	16	0	0	1	17
12 Jul	9	0	0	0	9
13 Jul	8	2	0	0	10
14 Jul	42	0	0	2	44
15 Jul	24	0	0	2	26
16 Jul	23	0	1	0	24
17 Jul	25	0	0	1	26
18 Jul	9	0	0	0	9
19 Jul	10	0	0	1	11
20 Jul	10	0	0	0	10
21 Jul	25	0	0	0	25
22 Jul	16	0	0	1	17
23 Jul	9	0	0	0	9
24 Jul	32	0	0	0	32
25 Jul	15	0	0	0	15
26 Jul	7	0	0	1	8
27 Jul	3	0	0	0	3
28 Jul	21	0	0	0	21
29 Jul	29	0	0	5	34
30 Jul	0	0	0	0	0
31 Jul	14	0	0	6	20
1 Aug	11	0	0	2	13
2 Aug	2	0	0	3	5
3 Aug	1	0	0	0	1
4 Aug	17	0	0	1	18
5 Aug	12	0	0	2	14
6 Aug	15	0	0	3	18
7 Aug	5	0	0	7	12
8 Aug	2	0	0	1	3
9 Aug	5	0	0	0	5
10 Aug	17	1	0	0	18
11 Aug	11	0	0	2	13
12 Aug	15	0	0	5	20
13 Aug	18	0	0	0	18
14 Aug	10	1	0	0	11
15 Aug	2	0	0	1	3
16 Aug	3	0	0	2	5
17 Aug	3	0	0	0	3
18 Aug	11	1	0	0	12
19 Aug	15	0	1	0	16
20 Aug	6	0	0	0	6
21 Aug	2	0	0	0	2
22 Aug	17	0	0	1	18
23 Aug	4	0	0	2	6
24 Aug	3	0	0	1	4
25 Aug	16	0	0	0	16
26 Aug	13	0	2	1	16
27 Aug	10	1	0	1	12
28 Aug	9	0	0	0	9
29 Aug	12	0	0	0	12
30 Aug	1	0	0	0	1
31 Aug	2	0	0	0	2
1 Sep	2	0	0	1	3
2 Sep	7	2	1	0	10
3 Sep	11	1	1	0	13
4 Sep	9	1	0	0	10
5 Sep	11	0	0	1	12
6 Sep	2	0	0	0	2
7 Sep	2	1	0	0	3
8 Sep	27	2	3	0	32
9 Sep	8	0	0	0	8
10 Sep	13	1	0	0	14
11 Sep	6	0	0	0	6
12 Sep	9	0	0	0	9
13 Sep	5	0	0	0	5
14 Sep	7	2	0	0	9
15 Sep	25	1	1	0	27
16 Sep	17	2	1	0	20
17 Sep	18	0	0	3	21
18 Sep	23	2	1	1	27
19 Sep	22	0	3	2	27
20 Sep	18	0	0	0	18
21 Sep	9	2	0	0	11
22 Sep	36	0	1	0	37
23 Sep	33	0	2	2	37
24 Sep	37	0	2	1	40
25 Sep	31	0	1	3	35
26 Sep	30	1	0	3	34
27 Sep	16	0	1	0	17
28 Sep	13	0	0	0	13
29 Sep	68	0	0	3	71
30 Sep	62	1	7	1	71
1 Oct	48	2	3	6	59
2 Oct	58	1	4	3	66
3 Oct	39	1	4	5	49
4 Oct	32	1	0	0	33
5 Oct	19	0	0	9	19
6 Oct	63	1	2	10	76
7 Oct	65	1	1	3	70
8 Oct	70	1	5	1	77
9 Oct	79	0	6	2	87
10 Oct	54	0	6	21	81
11 Oct	62	1	0	2	65
12 Oct	43	3	0	4	50
13 Oct	124	7	7	5	143
14 Oct	108	4	15	10	127
15 Oct	111	4	13	10	128
16 Oct	120	2	9	5	136
17 Oct	128	2	15	5	150
18 Oct	59	5	0	3	67
19 Oct	72	6	1	1	80
20 Oct	213	3	15	10	241
21 Oct	144	5	28	14	191
22 Oct	160	5	17	7	189
23 Oct	188	5	18	13	224
24 Oct	141	6	11	16	174
25 Oct	137	8	1	5	151
26 Oct	90	5	1	6	102
27 Oct	322	13	25	7	367
28 Oct	236	9	28	37	310
29 Oct	214	8	37	21	280
30 Oct	226	9	28	11	274
31 Oct	278	11	24	13	326
Total	41,132	708	2,843	1,872	46,555
Rate per 100k population	73.1	37.4	52.0	59.4	68.6

== Test positivity rate ==
The UK's test positivity rate, every seven days from 7 April 2020 until 14 December 2021. This is the percentage of tests that were positive out of all tests made on the day. Because testing rates vary over time, and can vary greatly between countries, the positivity rate is a key metric for measuring the pandemic. According to the World Health Organization, a positive rate of less than 5% for at least two weeks is one indicator the epidemic is under control in a country.

Test availability also varies over time, so the very high rates seen in spring 2020 are probably an over-estimate of positivity.

== New daily tests ==
New daily tests per 1000 population, smoothed, UK from April 2020 to January 2021 (chart):

== All-cause deaths ==
=== Comparison of 2020 (England and Wales) with average death rates and the 2014–15 flu season ===
Average deaths per week 2010–2019 excluding 'flu year q4,2014-q3,2015
deaths per week, 2014 quarter 4
deaths per week, 2015 quarters 1–3
deaths per week, 2020
deaths per week, 2021

Note: Average deaths per week are presented using the years 2010–2019 but excluding the recent year with particularly high incidence of 'flu, q4,2014-q3,2015; deaths per week 2020 covers weeks 1–42 inclusive. Data downloaded from mortality.org. The pronounced zigzags typically correspond to holiday periods when there may be a lag in the reporting of some deaths.

=== Comparison of numbers of deaths for all ages, second quarter ===
Excess deaths in the UK in 2020 to date have occurred mainly in the second quarter of the year. For this period, in England and Wales there were 49% more deaths than for the average of the preceding 10 years. The bar chart below shows all-cause deaths in England and Wales in quarter 2 (weeks 14–26, inclusive), year by year, based on mortality.org data, stmf.csv:

Mortality.org indicates the data for 2020 to be preliminary. The above is not adjusted by population size.

=== All-cause deaths for all ages ===
All-cause deaths in England and Wales in weeks 1–33, year by year, based on mortality.org data, stmf.csv:

mortality.org indicates the data for 2020 to be preliminary; above, the last two weeks available from mortality.org were excluded to prevent the worst effect of registration delay. The above is not adjusted by population size.

All-cause deaths in Scotland in weeks 1–30, year by year, based on mortality.org data, stmf.csv:

Note that a similar effect is seen to that in England and Wales, namely most excess deaths occurred in the second quarter of the year. Note also that mortality.org indicates the data for 2020 to be preliminary; above, the last two weeks available from mortality.org were excluded to prevent the worst effect of registration delay. The above is not adjusted by population size.

=== All-cause deaths for ages 0–14 ===
All-cause deaths in England and Wales in weeks 1–33, ages 0–14, year by year, based on mortality.org data, stmf.csv:

Note that COVID-19 has generally been found to have very low mortality rates for the very young. The source, mortality.org, indicates the data for 2020 to be preliminary; above, the last two weeks available from mortality.org were excluded to prevent the worst effect of registration delay. The above is not adjusted by population size.

All-cause deaths in Scotland in weeks 1–30, ages 0–14, year by year, based on mortality.org data, stmf.csv:

Note that the smaller population of Scotland compared with England and Wales results in a 'noisier' data set due to the relatively random nature of the events recorded here. The source, mortality.org indicates the data for 2020 to be preliminary; above, the last two weeks available from mortality.org were excluded to prevent the worst effect of registration delay. The above is not adjusted by population size.

=== All-cause deaths for ages 65–74 ===
All-cause deaths in England and Wales in weeks 1–33, ages 65–74, year by year, based on mortality.org data, stmf.csv:

Note that the period for 2020 is unique in that it includes deaths from COVID-19, but with very few of these prior to week 14. The source, mortality.org, indicates the data for 2020 to be preliminary; above, the last two weeks available from mortality.org were excluded to prevent the worst effect of registration delay. The above is not adjusted by population size.

== Hospitalisations ==
Daily hospital admissions of COVID-positive patients for England Statistics » COVID-19 Hospital Activity, with 7-day moving averages, based on two spreadsheets in the same source, one historic, one more current- note however that the data seems to be inconsistent between these two, 'admissions' vs. 'admissions... and diagnoses in hospital'.

Source for figures from March: COVID-19 daily situation report- Summary information from the daily situation report returns regarding COVID-19 Capacity, discharges and deaths: Provider Level Data – Admissions – Number of patients admitted with COVID-19 (Last 24hrs)

=== Daily covid-positive hospitalisations for England, August–December 2020 ===
August and September figures from a separate file at the same webpage: COVID-19 daily situation report COVID-19 admissions estimates in England- Number of estimated daily admissions and diagnoses for COVID-19: Section 1. Total reported admissions to hospital and diagnoses in hospital.

After 25 October 2020, hospitalisations rose to a high of 1,711 on 11 November, but afterwards drifted gradually down, reaching 1208 on 28 November, before climbing again and exceeding 1,800 on 17 December 2020; the rate peaked at around 4,000 per day in January 2021.

As of December 2021, similar data for the UK (and constituent nations) is available here.

== Vaccination ==
On 31 December 2021 the BBC wrote, "The UKHSA analysed more than 600,000 confirmed and suspected cases of the Omicron variant up to 29 December in England. It found that a single vaccine dose reduced the risk of needing hospital treatment by 52%. Adding the second dose increased the protection to 72%, although after 25 weeks that protection had faded to 52%. And two weeks after getting a third dose, that protection against hospitalisation was boosted to 88%."

On 1 February 2022 just 26,875 people in England got a third dose of COVID vaccine and 6 million people should have got their third dose at least six weeks previously. Distrust of the government due to Partygate is part of the reason for the poor response.

== Demographics ==
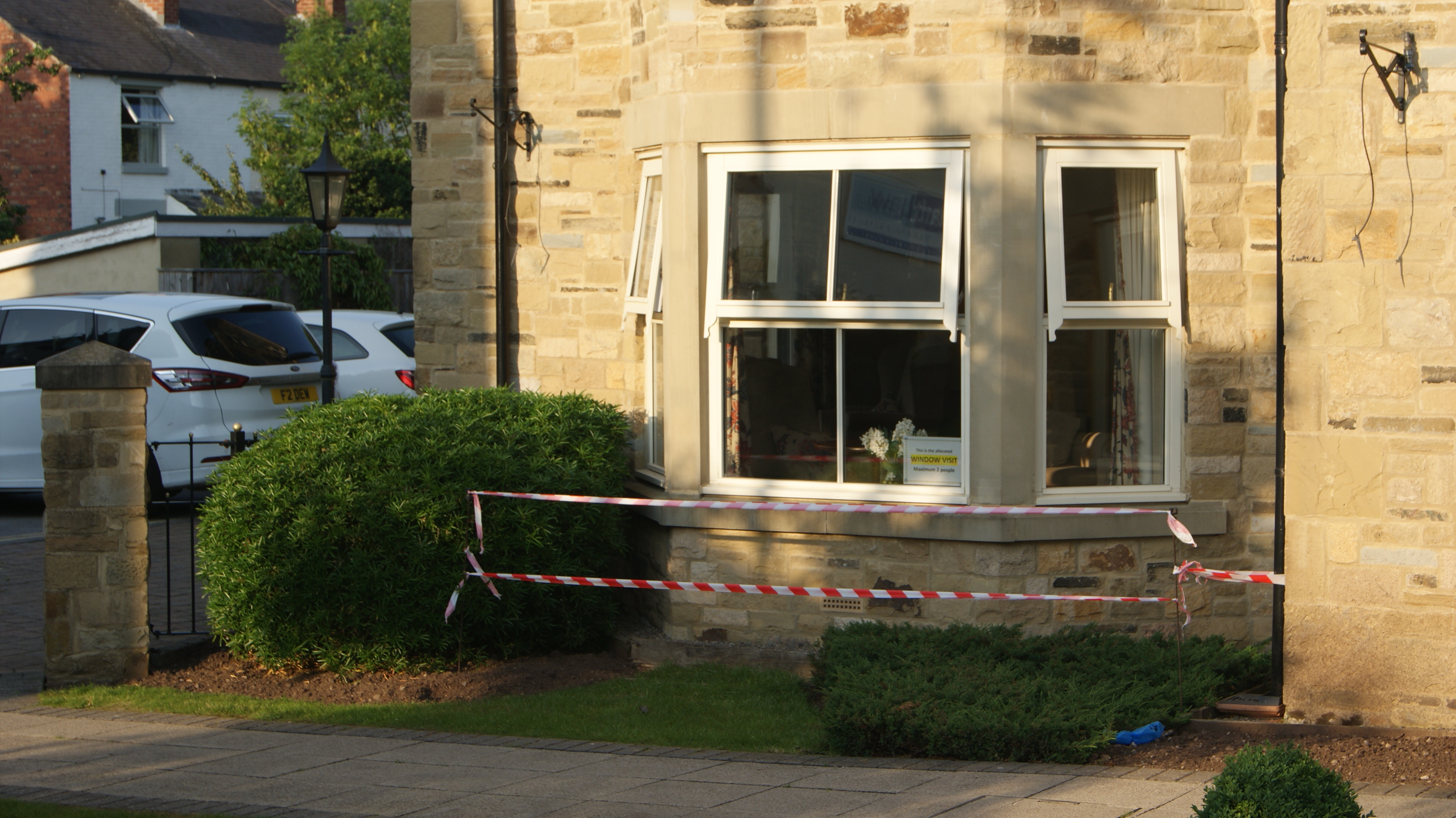
A 'visiting window' at a nursing home in Wetherby, West Yorkshire designed to reduce transmission to vulnerable residents.

Different demographics in the UK have been affected to different degrees by the coronavirus pandemic, and this may have medical, social or cultural causes.

=== Coronavirus risk and ethnicity ===
In April 2020, the British Medical Association called on the government to investigate if and why people from black, Asian and minority ethnic (BAME) groups were more vulnerable to COVID-19, after the first 10 doctors to die were all from the group. The Labour Party called for a public enquiry after the first 10 deaths in the health service were from BAME backgrounds. The Mayor of London Sadiq Khan wrote to the Equality and Human Rights Commission asking them to investigate whether the effects of coronavirus on BAME groups could have been prevented or mitigated. A group of 70 BAME figures sent a letter to Boris Johnson calling for an independent public enquiry into the disproportionate impact of the coronavirus on people from black, Asian and minority ethnic backgrounds.

Research by the Intensive Care National Audit and Research Centre concluded that people from BAME backgrounds made up 34% of critical patients. NHS England and Public Health England were appointed to lead an inquiry into why people from black and minority ethnic backgrounds appear to be disproportionately affected by coronavirus. On 18 April, Public Health England said that they would start recording the ethnicity of victims of coronavirus.

Research carried out by The Guardian newspaper concluded that ethnic minorities in England when compared to white people were dying in disproportionately high numbers. They said that deaths in hospitals up to 19 April 19% were from BAME backgrounds who make up only 15% of the population of England.

The Office for National Statistics (ONS), meanwhile, wrote that in England and Wales black men were four times more likely to die from coronavirus than white men, from figures gathered between 2 March to 10 April. They concluded that "the difference between ethnic groups in COVID-19 mortality is partly a result of socio-economic disadvantage and other circumstances, but a remaining part of the difference has not yet been explained". Some commentators including Dr. John Campbell have pointed to Vitamin D deficiency as a possible cause of the discrepancy, but the theory remains unproven.

Another study carried out by University of Oxford and the London School of Hygiene and Tropical Medicine on behalf of NHS England and a separate report by the Institute for Fiscal Studies corroborated the ONS' findings. An Oxford University led study into the impact of COVID-19 on pregnancy concluded that 55% of pregnant women admitted to hospital with coronavirus from 1 March to 14 April were from a BAME background. The study also concluded that BAME women were four times more likely to be hospitalised than white women.

A study by Public Health Scotland found no link between BAME groups and COVID-19. A second Public Health England study found that those with a Bangladeshi heritage were dying at twice the rate of white Britons. Other BAME groups had between 10% and 50% higher risk of death from COVID-19.

Public Health England continued to report quarterly on the progress of its research. In its final December 2021 report it concluded that (a) the main factors behind the higher risk of COVID-19 infection for ethnic minority groups were occupation, living in multigenerational households, and living in densely populated urban areas with poor air quality and higher levels of deprivation; (b) once infected, the risk of dying was higher for older people, males, people with disabilities, and people with other health conditions such as diabetes, and (c) a gene carried by 61% of people with South Asian ancestry doubled the risk of respiratory failure following COVID-19 infection.

As the vaccine programme gathered pace, it became clear that the level of take-up varied significantly between different ethnic groups. Notably, those identifying as Black or Black British reported the highest level of vaccine hesitancy, at over 40%.

=== Fines and ethnicity ===
Figures from the Metropolitan Police showed that BAME people received proportionally more fines than white people for breaching COVID-related restrictions.

=== Coronavirus risk and employment status ===
The ONS study, using data collected up to 17 April 2020 across England and Wales, concluded that men in low-skilled jobs were four times more likely to die from the virus than those in professional jobs. Women who worked as carers were twice as likely to die than those who worked in technical or professional jobs. The GMB trade union commented on the findings that ministers must stop any return to work until "proper guidelines, advice and enforcement are in place to keep people safe". An analysis of the figures by The Guardian concluded that deaths were higher in occupations where physical distancing was more difficult to achieve.

Analysis by The Independent and the Financial Times concluded that mortality rates from coronavirus were higher in deprived and urban areas than in prosperous and rural locations, across England and Wales. Analysis of the ONS data by the Guardian also concluded that by 13 May, only about 12% of people who had died from the virus in England and Wales were under 65 while 59% were over 80. A Public Health England report in June 2020 found that security guards, taxi and bus drivers, construction workers and social care staff were at a higher risk of COVID-19 when compared to other occupations.

=== Death rate and Brexit referendum ===
In November 2021 researchers from the universities of Oxford and Glasgow published a paper stating that the COVID-19 death rate was significantly lower (33%) in districts that voted most in favour of remaining in the European Union in the 2016 Brexit referendum. They suggest "different cultures and belief systems" should be taken into account in dealing with similar situations.

== See also ==
- How to Read Numbers, a book about statistical fallacies that uses COVID-19 statistics
