= Eat Out to Help Out =

British government scheme in 2020

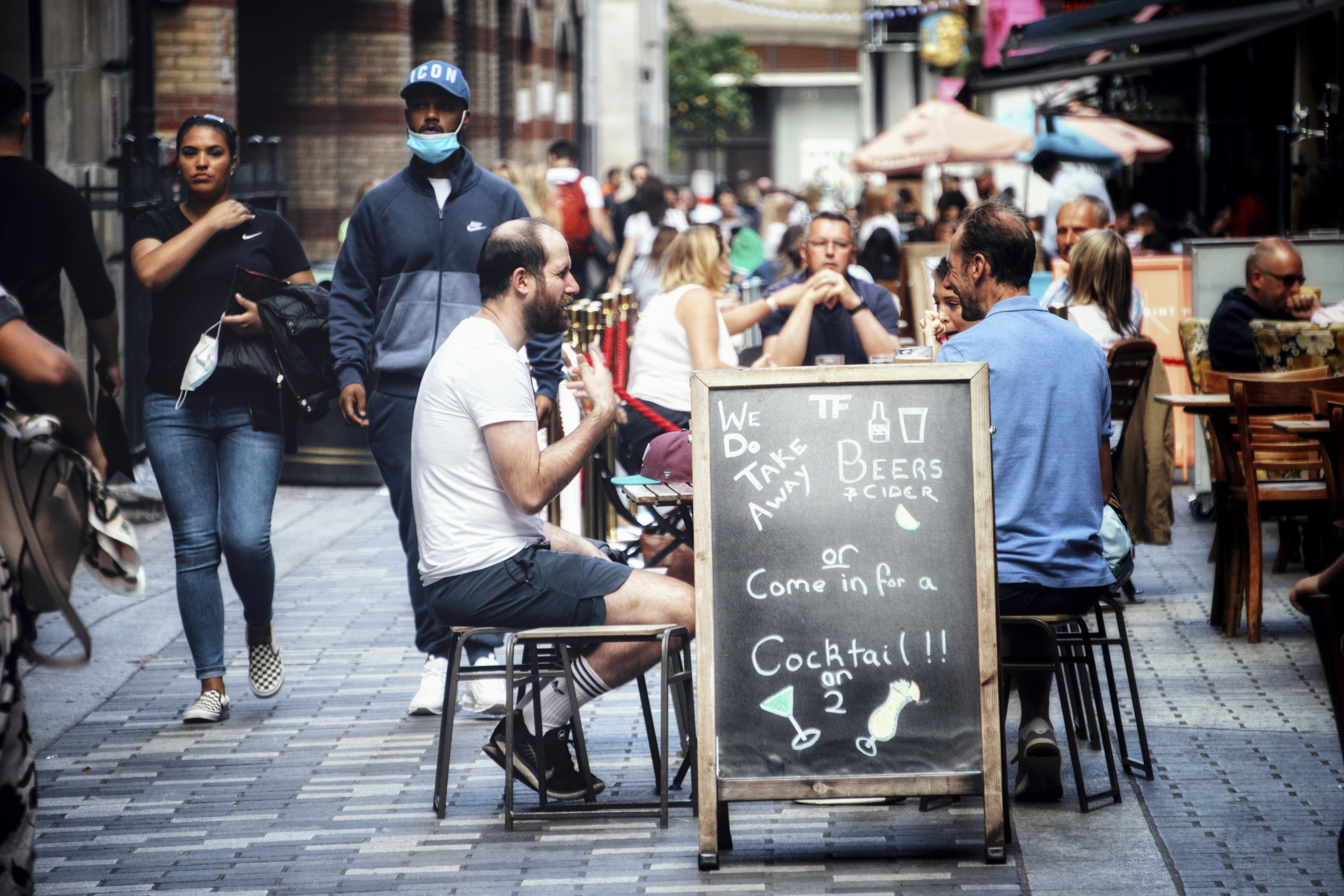
Diners at a restaurant in London in August 2020, when the Eat Out to Help Out scheme was in place

Eat Out to Help Out was a British government scheme to support and create jobs in the hospitality industry to counter the economic impacts of the COVID-19 pandemic. The scheme involved the government subsidising food and non-alcoholic drinks at participating cafes, pubs, and restaurants at 50%, up to £10 per person (per order). The offer, announced in July 2020, was available during the month of August 2020, from Monday to Wednesday each week.

In total, the scheme subsidised £849 million across 160 million meals. Some consider the scheme to be a success in boosting the hospitality industry, while others disagree. A 2021 study found that the scheme did not live up to its intended purpose, and contributed to a rise in COVID-19 infections.

== Background ==
The COVID-19 pandemic resulted in a significant economic impact, especially in the hospitality sector, due to a decline in tourism and leisure activities. Many sectors were ordered to close and the public to stay at home to reduce the spread of COVID-19 during lockdowns. Changes in consumer behaviour during the pandemic also resulted in the hospitality sector continuing to suffer losses after lockdowns were lifted. The Eat Out to Help Out scheme was designed to increase demand in the hospitality industry and encourage spending consumer behaviours.

== Scheme and impact ==
The scheme was announced by Rishi Sunak, the Chancellor of the Exchequer, on 8 July 2020 as part of the British government's Plan for Jobs strategy. £2 million was spent on focus groups and polling to promote the scheme. Patrick Vallance (the Chief Scientific Adviser) and Chris Whitty (the Chief Medical Adviser) were not informed of the scheme. Vallance's diary entries from the time say that Sunak said "it’s all about handling the scientists, not handling the virus", not realising Whitty was still in the room.

The scheme involved the government subsidising food and non-alcoholic drinks at participating cafes, pubs, and restaurants, where the food and drinks were consumed on the premises. The subsidy was for 50% of the order, up to £10 per person (per order). The offer was available from 3 to 31 August, from Monday to Wednesday each week. There were no limits on how many times an individual could use the discount.

The scheme led to a significant increase in restaurant visits during August, which were greater than the visits during the corresponding period a year prior (in August 2019). Participation in recreational activities was also increased by 5–6% on the days the scheme was active. Staff recruitment in the food service industry–measured by job postings–had increased by 7% to 14%, an increase not detected in other industries.

Regions where the scheme was utilised more frequently saw a rise in COVID-19 infections. After the scheme ended, infections in these regions had notably decreased. A 2021 academic paper suggested the scheme may have been responsible for "between 8–17% of all newly detected COVID-19 infections (and likely many more non-detected asymptomatic infections) in late summer". Two papers suggested that positive economic impacts were not sustained after the scheme had ended.

Further lockdowns were introduced later in 2020 after the scheme ended in response to an increase in COVID-19 infections, which forced many hospitality venues to close once again.

In an interview on The Andrew Marr Show in October 2020, Prime Minister Boris Johnson acknowledged the possibility that "Eat Out to Help Out" could have helped spread COVID-19. The 2021 academic study said "EOHO scheme may have contributed to indirect economic and public health costs that vastly outstrip its short-term economic benefits".

John Edmunds of the London School of Hygiene and Tropical Medicine, a member of the Sage committee of advisers during the pandemic described the scheme as "a spectacularly stupid idea and an obscene way to spend public money". At the COVID-19 inquiry, Edmunds stated that he was still angry about the scheme and that while it did not cause the second wave of COVID-19, it "encourage[d] people to take an epidemiological risk".

== See also ==
- British government response to the COVID-19 pandemic

== Sources ==
- Fetzer, Thiemo (26 October 2021). "Subsidising the spread of COVID-19: Evidence from the UK'S Eat-Out-to-Help-Out Scheme*". The Economic Journal. 132 (643): 1200–1217. doi:10.1093/ej/ueab074. ISSN 0013-0133. PMC 8574521.
- Hutton, Georgina (22 December 2020). Eat Out to Help Out Scheme (PDF) (Report).
- González-Pampillón, Nicolás; Nunez-Chaim, Gonzalo; Ziegler, Katharina (February 2021). Recovering from the first Covid-19 lockdown: Economic impacts of the UK's Eat Out to Help out scheme (PDF) (Report).
