= National Tutoring Programme =

UK government initiative to address learning loss during the COVID-19 pandemic

The National Tutoring Programme was a UK Government scheme announced in June 2020 and launched in November that year forming part of a £1.7 billion catch-up fund to try to address learning loss during the COVID-19 pandemic. It outsourced the tutoring of school children to 33 organisations, most of them private companies. The scheme attracted criticism over cost, claimed inefficiency, and over the use of children as tutors.

== Background ==
During the COVID-19 pandemic, schools in the UK had periods of closure and some teaching was done purely online. The government allocated funds to help disadvantaged students aged 5 to 16 catch up their lost learning. Initially in 2020 a billion pounds were allocated, including 350 million for the National Tutoring Programme to spend for a year. Later announcements extended this to two years and pledged an additional 700 million, 200 million of which was for the NTP.

The scheme ran for four years, with the academic year 2023-24 being the final year for the programme and for a separate 16-19 Tuition Fund. The Department for Education (DfE) has signalled its intention to support tutoring in the long term, but the current form this will take is unknown.

== Providers ==
The scheme published a list of approved providers, including private companies such as Pearson plc and Randstad Education as well as public bodies including the University of Sunderland, which trains and employs graduates to teach at school level. Of the 32 approved providers, 11 were non-profit entities.

== Funding ==
Schools chose which provider to use and could buy the tuition at a subsidised price. Initially, in the academic year 2020-21, the subsidy meant schools paid only one quarter of the full cost, though the government announced in early 2021 that the proportion of subsidy would increase in subsequent years, with schools paying 50% of the cost in the 2022–23 academic year and 90% the year after that.

In May 2023, the 25% subsidy for the academic year 2023-24 was amended to a 50% subsidy.

== Routes ==
As of the academic years 2022-23 and 2023-24, there were three routes to subsidised tuition under the umbrella of the NTP:

1. Academic mentors
2. Tuition partners
3. School-led tutoring

Academic mentors were tutors specifically recruited by the NTP's partner, Cognition Education. Tutors employed through the Tuition Partners route must be recruited through approved partners. In the academic year 2023-24, these partners were approved by Tribal Group. Finally, the school-led tutoring route allowed schools to employ new staff directly or engage current members of staff using the funding.

== Costs ==
An investigation by The Observer found that providers are charging the government much more than was being paid to the tutors. One such provider was being paid up to £84 per hour, while its least experienced tutoring jobs were advertised at £15 per hour. Another provider paid tutors between £20 and £30 per hour of tuition, while charging £80 per hour. The NTP defended the sums paid to providers, saying that the money not paid to tutors funded training, quality assurance, technology, and administration. The leader of the Association of School and College Leaders said that the way the money was being distributed "may decrease its effectiveness", and that it would be better to give the money directly to schools and colleges. Richard Adams, education editor of The Guardian, has argued that the scheme would be more effective if the schools received the money directly.

== Use of children as tutors ==
It was revealed in March 2021 that one of the providers, Third Space Learning (TSL), used Sri Lankan undergraduates as tutors, whose minimum age requirement was 17. TSL was one of the most-used providers in the scheme, providing tuition to 800 schools. TSL had claimed that its tutors were all STEM graduates, but its recruitment process required applicants to be "skilled in maths and English" and to pass an online test. Their tutors were paid an average of £3.07 an hour (a minimum of £1.57 per hour).

In response to the revelations, Third Space Learning clarified that all tutors were graduates or undergraduates, with credentials required as part of the recruitment process. The average age of Third Space Learning tutors was 24. Three out of 1,000 tutors were 17 year old undergraduates who were taken off the programme. They also clarified that the minimum payment of £1.57 was for sessions which were unattended or cancelled and average pay for tutors was 2.5 times the local graduate salary, or 15 times minimum wage.

Mary Bousted, joint general secretary of the National Education Union, said:

[T]here’s a question about whether it's ethical to be paying £1.57 to £3.07 an hour, outsourcing in this way. It also raises a bigger issue about why this money is being paid to the private sector whose objective in life must be to make a profit.

A spokesperson for the National Tutoring Programme said:

Third Space Learning is an example of a provider with an innovative approach and is proving popular with English schools. While our focus may be on supporting schools in England, it is right that we look outwards and harness all the expertise we can to do this. It does not – and should not – matter where an online tutor is based. What matters most is the quality of the support that they can give children and young people.

Third Space Learning now provides all maths tutoring to schools via its spoken AI tutor Skye.

== Enrolment ==
There was wide variation in enrolment in the scheme across the UK. The target was to reach 6,000 schools across the nine UK regions. The scheme reached 100% of its target number of schools enrolled in the South-West and 96.1% in the South-East, compared to 59.3% in the North-West, 58.8% in the North-East, and 58.9% in Yorkshire and the Humber.
