= Norwegian Covid-19 Commission =

Norwegian government commission on the authorities response to the COVID-19 pandemic

The Coronavirus Commission was a Norwegian government commission to conduct a review and assessment of the management of the COVID-19 pandemic by the Norwegian authorities. The commission was appointed on 24 April 2020 and is led by Stener Kvinnsland.

The Commission submitted its report to Prime Minister Erna Solberg on 14 April 2021.

== Members ==
The following is a list of the members of the Coronavirus Commission:

- Stener Kvinnsland (Chairman)
- Astri Aas-Hansen
- Geir Sverre Braut
- Knut Eirik Dybdal
- Tone Fløtten
- Rune Jakobsen
- Toril Johansson
- Christine Korme
- Nina Langeland
- Egil Matsen
- Per Arne Olsen
- Pål Terje Rørby

== Reactions ==
=== Secrecy ===
Jan Fridthjof Bernt criticised the 'extensive secrecy' surrounding the commission's work.

Representatives from the Labour Party, the Centre Party, and the Socialist People's Party were also critical.

== See also ==
- COVID-19 pandemic in Norway
