= Whatjobs =

International job search platform

- Type: Private
- Industry: Internet, Job search engine
- Founded: May 2014; 12 years ago
- Founder: Alexander Paterson
- Headquarters: London, United Kingdom
- Area served: Global
- Services: Job search, advertising
- Number of employees: 77
- Website: www.whatjobs.com

Whatjobs is an international job search platform, that operates in 77 countries. It was originally founded in 2014 as AdView.

== History ==
Whatjobs was established by Alex Paterson in May 2014, under the name AdView. The platform initially concentrated on delivering fresh job listings to candidates via email and banner advertising.

In 2016, Whatjobs secured investment from Shane McGourty, a former executive at Monster.com in Ireland, to expand and enhance its services. In 2019, AdView was rebranded as Whajobs. In November 2020, WhatJobs acquired the Spanish job search group Elcurriculum.com.

During the COVID-19 pandemic in April 2020, Whatjobs published vacancies for the British National Health Service(NHS). The company also helps the championship football team Reading F.C.

In 2022, Whatjobs News launched a dedicated business news platform in Ukraine. In the same year, the company opened an office in Italy.

In 2023, Whatjobs appointed Heiko Zeichner, the founder of the German job board Gigajob.com, as its new chairman.
