= Zoe Health Study =

COVID-19 mobile research app

- Developers: King's College London; Guy's Hospital; St Thomas' Hospital; Zoe Limited
- Operating system: Android, iOS
- Type: COVID-19 apps
- Website: health-study.joinzoe.com

The Zoe Health Study, formerly the COVID Symptom Study, is a health research project of British company Zoe Limited (formerly Zoe Global limited) which uses a mobile app that runs on Android and iOS.

The app was created in 2020 in response to the COVID-19 pandemic, in a collaboration between Zoe, King's College London, Guy's and St Thomas' Hospitals with funding granted by the UK government until April 2022. The purpose of the app was to track COVID-19 symptoms and other salient data in a large number of people, to enable epidemiological results to be calculated.

== Timeline ==
The idea for an app to track the spread of COVID-19 came from Tim Spector, an epidemiologist at King's College London. In the early months of 2020 he used his startup company ZOE Global Limited to build a Covid Symptom Tracker app in collaboration with King's College London and Guy's and St Thomas' hospitals. By May 2020 the app's name had changed to COVID Symptom Study. Initially the project was UK-based, where there is open membership. In the United States at a later date various cohorts from existing studies were added, including from the Nurses' Health Study; this research was in collaboration with Massachusetts General Hospital. The project website states that ZOE COVID Study data provided will not be sold (aggregate data from wider Zoe health studies research may be used by Zoe to develop commercial health products). The project also collaborated with the Outbreaks Near Me platform based out of Harvard Medical School and Boston Children's Hospital.

The app was released as a trial for 5,000 twins, using patients involved in other Zoe research projects. It was later expanded for use by non-twins. The app entered the UK Apple App Store and Google Play Store on 24 March, and the US App and Play stores on 29 March.

At the end of April 2020, the project received assistance from the Department of Health and Social Care which allowed it to offer up to 10,000 COVID-19 tests each week to participants. In August 2020, the UK government made a grant of £2 million to support data collection by the project, and by August 2021, government funding amounted to £5m. In May 2021, the associated company name was changed from ZOE Global Limited to ZOE Limited. Government funding (latterly via the UK Health Security Agency) ceased at the end of March 2022.

In May 2022, ZOE announced that the name of the study would change to ZOE Health Study, to reflect its use in logging symptoms extending beyond those of COVID-19.

== Uptake ==

Within 24 hours of being available in the UK, the app had been downloaded over 1 million times. A paper using data collected in the four weeks up to 21 April 2020 analysed symptoms from 2.45 million people in the UK and 168,000 in the US. As of May 2020, the app had been downloaded by over 3 million people, including 2 million Britons. By 17 July the number exceeded 4 million.

Researchers who analysed data collected in the last three months of 2020 said they used more than 65 million health reports from 1.76 million users. By July 2021, the app had been used by 4.6 million people in Britain and about a quarter of that number continued to self-report every day.

== Research ==
The COVID Symptom Study requires users to give their location. Users give personal information including age, gender and location, and report if they have any underlying chronic conditions. They also answer questions related to common COVID-19 symptoms, and input any illness or symptoms that they have, as well as stating whether they have been tested for COVID-19. Beginning in May 2020, a random sample of users is selected (on the first day they report symptoms) for a swab test. Researchers then use statistical analysis to determine which symptoms are likely to indicate COVID-19, rather than the common cold or seasonal influenza. The app does not have any contact tracing functionality.

Based on the data inputted into the app, researchers estimated that when cases peaked on 1 April 2020, 2.1 million people in the UK aged between 20 and 69 may have had COVID-19, and that as of 23 May 2020, 280,000 people in that age range currently had symptoms consistent with COVID-19. The study also estimates the risk level to health workers, compared with the general public. Research based on the app was described in papers in Science on 5 May 2020 and in Nature Medicine on 11 May 2020. Using data from the app, researchers were able to identify six distinct types of COVID-19 and forecast which initial symptoms were more likely to lead to severe illnesses.

== Zoe Limited ==
Zoe Limited also provides in the US and UK, as a separate product, a "personalized nutrition program" whereby the company supplies sensors to quantify a person's gut microbiome, blood fat, and blood sugar responses to food intake, alongside an app which uses this data to recommend dietary modifications.

== See also ==
- NHS COVID-19
