= Rapid reviews =

Systematic survey of literature on a topic

Rapid reviews are a systematic survey of literature on a topic or question of interest. Compared to a systematic review of literature, in a rapid review, several design decisions and practical steps are undertaken to reduce the time it takes to identify, aggregate and answer the question of interest. The Cochrane Rapid Reviews Methods Group proposes that rapid reviews can take different forms, and they define rapid reviews as: "A form of knowledge synthesis that accelerates the process of conducting a traditional systematic review through streamlining or omitting specific methods to produce evidence for stakeholders in a resource-efficient manner".

== In medicine and healthcare ==
Rapid reviews are a form of evidence synthesis, similar to a systematic review, that can be used to inform decision-making and healthcare initiative. The World Health Organization (WHO) considers rapid reviews as a way of generating evidence in a short period using an abbreviated systematic review method. During the COVID-19 pandemic rapid reviews were employed to answer pressing questions under strict time constraints.

== In software engineering ==
For Software Engineering, Rico et al. have recently adapted and extended the rapid review method. Their proposal takes into account the unique requirements of industry-academia collaboration in SE research. The extension proposed by them highlights the ways in which practitioners and researchers can collaborate in the planning, design and conduct of a rapid review. The guidelines by Rico et al. have been used in two rapid reviews, one on machine learning and another on software component selection
