= UK COVID-19 Inquiry =

Public inquiry into the United Kingdom's handling of COVID-19

- Date: 28 June 2022 – (in progress)
- Location: Dorland House, Westbourne Terrace, London, United Kingdom
- Participants: Heather Hallett (chair)
- Website: covid19.public-inquiry.uk

The UK Covid-19 Inquiry is an independent public inquiry into the United Kingdom's response to, and the impact of, the COVID-19 pandemic, and to learn lessons for the future. Public hearings began in June 2023. Boris Johnson announced the inquiry in May 2021, to start in Spring 2022. In December 2021, Heather Hallett was announced as the chair of the inquiry.

The draft terms of the inquiry include the UK's preparedness for the pandemic, the use of lockdowns and other non-pharmaceutical interventions, pandemic management in hospitals and care homes, equipment procurement, and the financial support made available. It covers the period up to and including the Inquiry being established on 28 June 2022, and England, Wales, Scotland and Northern Ireland. There is also a separate Scottish COVID-19 Inquiry.

== Calls for an inquiry ==
The BMJ advocated for an inquiry in May 2020 to take place before an expected second wave of infections.

Covid-19 Bereaved Families for Justice were pressuring the government to launch a judge-led statutory public inquiry into the pandemic and the government's response to it, with a rapid review phase. The group threatened legal action, and lawyers representing the group informed ministers that they were planning to seek judicial review by the High Court. Lawyers representing the group have acted in major public inquiries including into the Hillsborough, Grenfell Tower and Manchester Arena disasters.

Medical professionals who supported an inquiry included Chaand Nagpaul, Donna Kinnair, Paul Nurse, and leading medical think tank the King's Fund. Unions such as the TUC, Unison, GMB the British Medical Association, Royal College of Nursing and Royal College of Physicians were also in support. Equality activists Zara Mohammed and Simon Woolley supported an inquiry.

Calls for an inquiry was supported by political figures Keir Starmer (Leader of the Labour Party and Leader of the Opposition), Ed Davey (Leader of the Liberal Democrats), Bob Kerslake (former Head of the Home Civil Service), and former Conservative Prime Minister David Cameron. Justin Welby, the Archbishop of Canterbury, had also called for an inquiry. The Institute for Government also supported inquiry calls.

Researchers and members of the pressed proposed many topics that should be addressed in the inquiry, including: the scientific advice given to ministers, the death rate in the UK, the test, track and trace system, communication of infection control measures and implementation of lockdown measures, travel restrictions, attempts to redress the disproportionate impact of COVID-19 on ethnic minorities, as well as a review of the functioning of the National Health Service and its staff during the pandemic. Healthcare topics include supplies of personal protective equipment, the transfer of patients from hospitals to care homes, risk assessments (including failures to respond to warnings in 2017's Exercise Cygnus, which reported that the UK was not prepared for a pandemic), isolation, staff testing, the functioning of 111 services, the centralisation of decision-making (including tensions between the government and regional mayors) and the role of austerity in decision-making.

In March 2021 polling, 47% of the British public supported an inquiry, with 35% neither supporting nor opposing or didn't know, and 18% opposed.

== Inquiry ==
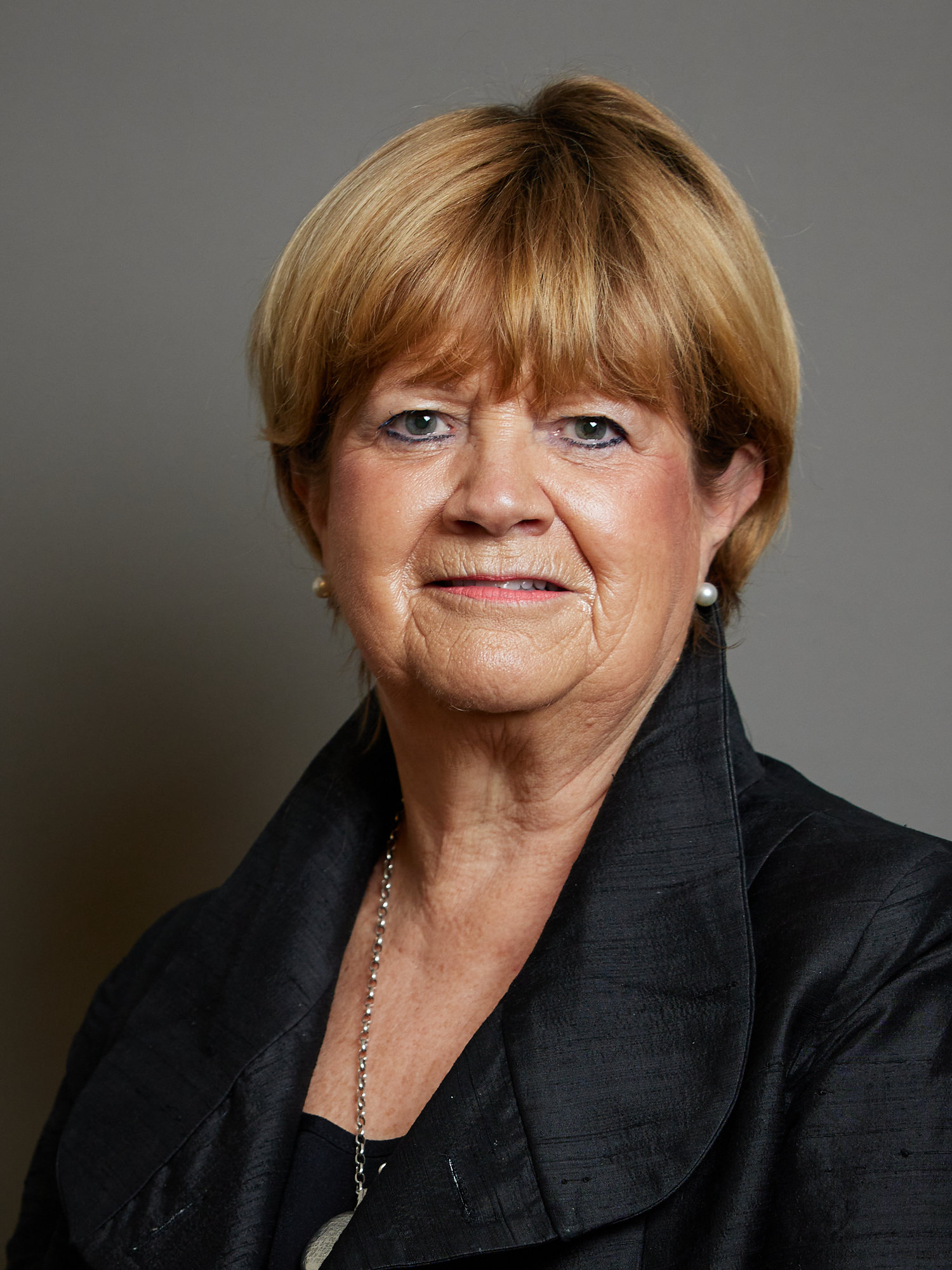
Inquiry Chair Heather Hallett

Boris Johnson announced in May 2021 that an inquiry would take place, and start in spring 2022. He said the date was chosen because of a possible winter surge in infections, but that preparatory work on the terms of reference would start earlier, as would choosing a chair.

On 15 December 2021, Heather Hallett was announced as the chair of the inquiry. Unlike other public inquiries, a statutory public inquiry has the power to subpoena people and take evidence under oath. The inquiry will be the biggest ever such undertaking by the UK government.

Draft terms of reference were announced on 11 March 2022. Issues covered included the UK's preparedness, the use of lockdowns and other non-pharmaceutical interventions, pandemic management in hospitals and care homes, equipment procurement, and the financial support made available.

Keir Starmer, the Leader of the Opposition, and Care Campaign for the Vulnerable both criticised the decision to omit Partygate from the terms. A former Children's Commissioner for England, Anne Longfield, called the lack of focus on children's experiences in lockdown a "shocking oversight".

Public consultation on the terms ran from 11 March until 7 April and received over 20,000 responses. Hallett has said she would consider these responses and present her revised recommendations to Johnson in May 2022. Final terms of reference were published on 28 June 2022, allowing the inquiry to formally commence. The first preliminary public hearing took place on 4 October 2022. Full public hearings began on 13 June 2023 and are expected to conclude on 5 March 2026.

The Inquiry is split into ten modules. As of February 2026, reports had been published relating to the first two modules with all remaining reports expected to be published by the end of the first half of 2027:

1. Resilience and preparedness
2. Core UK decision-making and political governance
3. Impact of Covid-19 pandemic on healthcare systems in the 4 nations of the UK
4. Vaccines and therapeutics
5. Procurement
6. Care sector
7. Test, Trace and Isolate
8. Children and Young People
9. Economic response
10. Impact on society

=== Request for Johnson material ===
The Inquiry asked for diaries, notebooks and WhatsApp messages by Johnson. The request included:

- Unredacted messages sent and received by Johnson from 1 January 2020 to 24 February 2022
- Unredacted diaries for Johnson from 1 January 2020 to 24 February 2022
- Copies of 24 unredacted notebooks filled in by Johnson from 1 January 2020 to 24 February 2022
- Unredacted messages sent and received by adviser Henry Cook from 1 January 2020 to 24 February 2022

Johnson had provided materials to the Cabinet Office, although it later emerged that he had only provided WhatsApp messages from May 2021 when he got a new phone following a security breach on his previous phone.

The Cabinet Office supplied redacted versions, saying they had removed material not relevant to the Inquiry, but the Inquiry asked for the unredacted material using a Section 21 notice, leading to a dispute in May 2023 with the government. The Cabinet Office launched legal action, a judicial review, on 1 June over their concerns that handing over all the material would compromise ministers' and other individuals' right to privacy. The legal action argued against the inquiry having "the power to compel production of documents and messages which are unambiguously irrelevant to the inquiry's work". On 6 July 2023, the High Court ruled that the government must release the documents to the inquiry, and the government said it accepted the ruling.

=== Module 1 – The resilience and preparedness of the United Kingdom ===
Public hearings for Module 1 – resilience and preparedness – began on 13 June 2023. Former prime minister David Cameron told the inquiry that his government had focussed too much on preparations for an influenza pandemic, and that there were failures to act on findings from the 2016 Exercise Alice simulation; he denied that austerity measures had weakened the health service. George Osborne, former chancellor, argued that austerity had left Britain better prepared, making money available for furlough and other programmes. Former Health Secretary Matt Hancock criticised the government's preparedness for a pandemic, saying it was too focused on handling the aftermath of a pandemic rather than preventing one, and that resources were prioritised on planning for the event of a no-deal Brexit. Former Scottish First Minister Nicola Sturgeon told the inquiry that Scotland did not have a "set plan" to deal with a pandemic such as Covid 19. She also stated that the Scottish government was "not happy" that potential pandemic planning resources were reallocated to plan for a possible no-deal Brexit instead.

=== Module 2 – Decision-making and political governance ===
Hearings for module two of the inquiry – Decision-making and Political Governance – began on 3 October 2023. Former Chief Adviser to the Prime Minister Dominic Cummings gave evidence on 31 October 2023. In WhatsApp messages sent to senior adviser Lee Cain, Cummings said that then prime minister Boris Johnson believed that the pandemic would "be like the swine flu". In other messages in reference to deputy cabinet secretary Helen MacNamara, he called her propriety and ethics "bullshit" and said that it was "designed to waste huge amounts of his time". He also said that he wanted to "personally handcuff her and escort her from the building" and that answering her questions was like "dodging stilettos". Cummings was asked if these statements were misogynistic, which he denied. In other messages Cummings called ministers "useless fuckpigs [sic]", "cunts" and "morons".

== Deletion of WhatsApp messages ==
During the Inquiry, it was discovered that various members of the devolved governments had deleted WhatsApp messages discussing their respective responses to the pandemic. In January 2024, it was revealed that the former First Minister of Scotland, Nicola Sturgeon's messages had been deleted. This also happened with her deputy, John Swinney's due to his settings being on auto-delete. The Scottish Government response was that messages were lost during routine changes of government phones. Later in the year, a similar discovery was made about the First Minister of Wales, Vaughan Gething, whom was the Welsh Minister for Health and Social Services during the pandemic. Despite claiming to the inquiry he had not ordered deletion of messages, he had stated in a WhatsApp group that he was deleting all messages from it due to them being subject to freedom of information requests. This formed part of the 2024 Welsh government crisis, that led to Gething resigning as First Minister.

== Critical response ==
The Covid Inquiry was criticised by the director of the University of Oxford's Centre for Evidence-Based Medicine, Carl Heneghan, who gave evidence to the inquiry, for refusing to engage in the core issues of the pandemic and "silencing science" and being too concerned with the offensiveness of language in private messages. Heneghan criticised the inquiry for attempting to attack his credentials while ignoring previous publications, and ignoring generalist analysis which he said would have been useful during the pandemic.

Heneghan said that the inquiry should consider the side effects of the "Protect the NHS", messaging that Heneghan believes reduced care for diseases other than covid; whether the confinement of care-home residents was a good policy, which he believes was both ineffective and had immense human costs; the reliability of test-and-trace; and the accuracy and use of epidemiological modelling in decision making.

Michael Simmons, writing in The Spectator, said that the Inquiry was asking the wrong questions and had learned nothing about the problems of the use of modelling which he thought had led to inaccuracies in decision making. He says that the models failed to consider the effects of behaviour change, citing historic work by Neil Ferguson, and evidence given Ben Warner.

Heneghan argues that there was a need for a "red team" to challenge government policy during future pandemics given Heneghan's belief that young academics were unable to challenge an orthodoxy during the pandemic. Writing in the Financial Times, Camilla Cavendish, says that by June 2020 she had formed an opinion that the government needed a red team to challenge assumptions, she argues that such a team could have answered legitimate questions about whether lockdowns were working, the balance between the young and the old, and the accuracy of scientific models.

Heneghan said that rather than assessing whether lockdowns were an effective policy the inquiry assumed that the correct policy was to impose more severe lockdown restrictions earlier. Simmons said that the Inquiry should answer whether lockdowns worked definitively, citing evidence given by Simon Stevens that expressed the same view.

== See also ==
- Coronakommissionen, a Swedish independent commission to evaluate the government's response to COVID-19
- List of public inquiries in the United Kingdom
