= Scottish COVID-19 Inquiry =

Public inquiry into the United Kingdom's handling of COVID-19

The Scottish COVID-19 Inquiry is an independent public inquiry into Scotland's response to, and the impact of, the COVID-19 pandemic, and to learn lessons for the future.

The Inquiry will investigate aspects of the devolved strategic response to the pandemic, and it will cover health, education and support. It covers the period from 1 January 2020 to 31 December 2022.

== Inquiry ==
The Scottish Inquiry is separate to the broader UK Covid-19 Inquiry. Its initial chair, Lady Poole, quit for personal reasons and was replaced by Lord Brailsford. Four members of the Inquiry's legal team stepped down in October 2022, delaying its start.

In May 2023, the Inquiry launched a website asking Scots to share their personal experience of the pandemic.

The inquiry opened on 26 July 2023, with its first hearing taking place in Dundee.

== See also ==
- Coronakommissionen, a Swedish independent commission to evaluate the government's response to COVID-19
