= Timeline of the COVID-19 pandemic in the United Kingdom (July–December 2021) =

Graph of COVID-19 cases for July–December 2021 from government data

The following is a timeline of the COVID-19 pandemic in the United Kingdom from July 2021 to December 2021.

There are significant differences in the legislation and the reporting between the countries of the UK: England, Scotland, Northern Ireland, and Wales. The numbers of cases and deaths are reported on a government Web site updated daily during the pandemic. The UK-wide COVID Symptom Study based on surveys of four million participants, endorsed by authorities in Scotland and Wales, run by health science company ZOE, and analysed by King's College London researchers, publishes daily estimates of the number of new and total current COVID-19 infections (excluding care homes) in UK regions, without restriction to only laboratory-confirmed cases.

== Events ==
=== July 2021 ===
==== 1 July ====
- The Coronavirus Job Retention Scheme begins to wind down, with plans for it to cease at the end of September. Figures from HM Revenue & Customs show a million people came off the scheme during May 2021, with 2.4 million employees covered by it at the end of the month, the lowest number of workers on furlough during the pandemic.
- Prime Minister Boris Johnson announces he will set out the final step of the roadmap for lifting restrictions in England in the next few days, and says he hopes that life will return to as close as possible to its pre-pandemic status.

==== 2 July ====
- On her final official visit to the UK, German Chancellor Angela Merkel announces that double vaccinated people from the UK should be able to travel to Germany without having to quarantine "in the foreseeable future".
- Following reports that the EU's vaccine passport scheme does not recognise the AstraZeneca vaccine manufactured by India's Serum Institute, Prime Minister Boris Johnson says he is "very confident" there "will not prove to be a problem" for travellers who have received the vaccine.

==== 3 July ====
- As COVID cases rise again, the British Medical Association calls for some COVID restrictions to remain in England beyond 19 July, the day set for the final lifting of all restrictions.

==== 4 July ====
- Downing Street confirms that Prime Minister Boris Johnson will set out the final stages of the road map out of lockdown at a press conference the following day.
- Housing Secretary Robert Jenrick says that from 19 July England will move into a period when legal restrictions are lifted and people will have to exercise "personal responsibility", including whether or not to wear a face mask. The Scottish Government says there will be an "ongoing need" for face masks after its restrictions are fully lifted on 9 August. Mick Antoniw, the Counsel General for Wales, says that Wales is "moving to a stage where we are having increasing normality".
- A group of business leaders under the banner of London First write an open letter to Prime Minister Boris Johnson urging ministers to "set the country clearly on the path to recovery" by encouraging people to return to the office.

==== 5 July ====
- Prime Minister Boris Johnson sets out the last stage of the road map for lifting restrictions, expected to be on 19 July. It will see an end to the compulsory wearing of masks, of social distancing, the rule of six in private homes and the work from home rule. The plans will be confirmed on 12 July.
- The Duchess of Cambridge is required to self-isolate after coming into contact with someone who has tested positive for COVID, meaning that she misses events to mark the 73rd anniversary of the National Health Service, which are attended by her husband, the Duke of Cambridge.
- Germany announces the lifting of restrictions on travellers from the UK from Wednesday 7 July.

==== 6 July ====
- Health Secretary Sajid Javid confirms that people in England who have received both vaccines will no longer be required to self-isolate when a close contact tests positive for COVID, from 16 August.
- Education Secretary Gavin Williamson confirms that the "bubble" system in English schools will cease from 19 July.

==== 7 July ====
- Prime Minister Boris Johnson says the timetable for the road map out of England's restrictions are "balanced and reasonable" with the number of fully vaccinated people meaning it can go ahead as planned.
- The number of COVID cases in the UK rises above 30,000 for the first time since February with 32,548 cases recorded for this date; 33 deaths are recorded over the same period.
- Analysis produced by the BBC suggests 4.5 million people may be asked to self-isolate before the rules in England change for double vaccinated people on 16 August, placing strain on the economy and the health service. Ministers are urged to review the proposals.
- The UK government confirms the £20 Universal Credit top up introduced at the beginning of the pandemic will be phased out in the autumn.
- Figures produced by the Halifax Building Society indicate that house prices fell by 0.5% in June 2021 as the stamp duty holiday began to be phased out.
- More than 60,000 people are allowed to attend England's Euro 2020 semi-final match with Denmark at Wembley Stadium, meaning the stadium is at 75% capacity.

==== 8 July ====
- The UK government confirms that fully vaccinated UK residents arriving into England from amber list countries will no longer be required to quarantine after 19 July, but will still be required to pay for COVID tests. Northern Ireland confirms it will adopt the same policy from 26 July, while Wales and Scotland are undecided on the matter.

==== 9 July ====
- The UK government suggests the NHS contact tracing app will need to change after 19 July amid concerns over people deleting it to avoid self-isolating.
- The NHS COVID-19 app is to be tweaked so that fewer isolation alerts are sent out, it is reported, though the time when this change will be implemented is yet to be confirmed.
- Data from the Office for National Statistics shows that COVID infections are increasing, with one in 150 people estimated to have the virus.
- A study of one million people classed as clinically vulnerable during the early stages of the pandemic shows that vaccines work effectively for them.
- The Immigration Service Union warns that an increase in the number of travellers over the summer could lead to queues of up to six hours at UK airports during peak times.

==== 10 July ====
- The Academy of Medical Royal Colleges warns that cases of COVID-19 will rise 'dramatically' before the situation improves.
- Ministers are reported to be considering exempting fully vaccinated NHS staff in England from having to self-isolate if they are contacted by contact tracing.

==== 11 July ====
- Ahead of a press conference the next day, in which he is expected to confirm the lifting of restrictions on 19 July, Prime Minister Boris Johnson advises people to be cautious, and says that cases, currently at around 30,000 per day, will rise as society reopens.
- The CBI publishes a six-point plan in which it urges the government to bring forward planned changes to the rules governing self-isolation.
- Around 67,000 fans attend England's Euro 2020 final match against Italy at Wembley Stadium. The 90,000 capacity stadium is operating on reduced numbers because of the pandemic. A small number of fans without tickets manage to break into the stadium to watch the game.

==== 12 July ====
- Health Secretary Sajid Javid and Prime Minister Boris Johnson confirm almost all COVID restrictions will be removed in England on 19 July.
- Javid announces that nightclubs and other similar venues will be encouraged to ask people to provide either proof of vaccination, immunity, or a negative test.
- More than 100 members of staff at Heathrow Airport are reported to be self isolating, with passengers complaining of long queues as a result of a staff shortage.
- Speaking Up for the Covid Generation, a report commissioned by I CAN estimates that 1.5 million children have fallen behind with their communication skills because of education time lost as a result of the pandemic.

==== 13 July ====
- Scottish First Minister Nicola Sturgeon announces that Scotland will move to level zero restrictions from 19 July, but that the wearing of face coverings will remain mandatory for some time after that.
- Police say there has been a significant increase in the number of stalking cases in England and Wales during the pandemic, with 80,000 incidents recorded during 2020.
- Companies say they will take a cautious approach to bringing their employees back to the workplace after restrictions are lifted on 19 July in England.
- The House of Commons votes 319–246 to approve legislation requiring the compulsory vaccination of care home staff in England from October 2021.
- The UK government passes legislation to keep the international development budget at 0.5% of Gross Domestic Product with a majority of 35, despite 25 of their own MPs voting to block it. Boris Johnson has said the money is needed to keep down the national debt during the COVID crisis.

==== 14 July ====
- The Welsh Government announces that most COVID restrictions in Wales will be lifted on 7 August. The rules regarding the numbers of people allowed to meet up indoors and outdoors will be scrapped, but face coverings will still be required in most indoor settings, including pubs, restaurants and schools.
- A report compiled by the Academy of Medical Science warns the health service could be placed under pressure by a surge in flu and other respiratory conditions during the coming winter.
- Ibiza, Majorca, Menorca and Formentera are to be moved to the amber list from Monday 19 July, fifteen days after they were moved to the green watch list.
- The Royal College of Obstetricians and Gynaecologists (RCOG) and the Royal College of Midwives (RCM) have warned that the lifting of COVID restrictions in England on 19 July could lead to an increase in the number of infections among pregnant women.
- It is reported that some mortgage lenders are refusing loans to self-employed people who took government grants during the pandemic, with those working in hospitality, travel and entertainment the worst affected.
- Supermarket retailers Sainsbury's and Tesco have announced they will encourage customers to continue to wear face coverings after Monday 19 July, even though they will no longer be a legal requirement in England from that date.
- A group of trade unions has called forMPs to be excluded from the House of Commons if they refuse to wear a face covering. Masks are compulsory for Commons staff, but not for MPs as they are not employed by the House of Commons.
- Organisers of a scaled-down version of the Boomtown Festival titled the Boom Village Festival, and scheduled to be held near Winchester, have cancelled the event because of rising COVID cases in the area.

==== 15 July ====
- A record 618,903 people were alerted to self-isolate by the NHS COVID-19 app in the week of 8–15 July.
- A further 48,553 daily COVID cases are recorded, the highest daily figure since February 2021, but broadly in line with the estimates of 50,000 cases by 19 July. Figures from NHS Test and Trace also show the NHS COVID-19 app sent out over half a million self-isolation alerts in the first week of July, with 530,126 alerts generated.
- Goldman Sachs announces that staff returning to its London offices will be required to wear face masks from 19 July, though unlike other banks they will not be required to have the vaccine.
- The meat industry warns that a shortage of staff because of COVID could affect production.
- A study led by Professor Calum Semple indicates that younger adults admitted to hospital with COVID are almost as likely to suffer complications as those over the age of 50.
- BBC News reports that Guy's and St Thomas' NHS Foundation Trust are trialling a therapy using a patient's own blood cells to treat lung scarring from COVID.
- Airlines UK urges the government to provide clarity on travel to Bulgaria and Croatia to which travellers are advised to avoid all but essential travel even though both are to be added to the green list from 19 July.

==== 16 July ====
- The UK records 51,870 daily COVID cases, the first time the number of daily cases has passed 50,000 since January 2021.
- Fully vaccinated travellers returning to England and Wales from France will still be required to quarantine for 10 days after 19 July, it is announced, because of persistent cases of the Beta variant.
- Fresh concerns are voiced by manufacturing and health representatives about a potential "surge" in people required to self-isolate, particularly after rules are changed in England and Scotland on 19 July, and the UK government is urged to bring forward changes to its rules for self-isolation in England from 16 August.
- Public Health England warns of an unseasonable rise in the number of cases of the winter vomiting bug, with 154 cases reported over the preceding five weeks, a rise from the average of 53.
- The build-up to the 2021 British Grand Prix begins at Silverstone, with 350,000 expected to attend the event over the weekend.
- The Green Man Festival, one of the largest in Wales, is given the go-ahead to be staged from 19 to 22 August.

==== 17 July ====
- The UK government's eleventh hour decision to exclude fully vaccinated travellers arriving from France from forthcoming changes to quarantine rules attracts criticism from holidaymakers and travel sector representatives, an example being EasyJet boss Johan Lundgren, who says the government are "making it up as they go along and causing confusion and uncertainty".
- Health Secretary Sajid Javid confirms he has tested positive for COVID-19 and is self-isolating.
- As the UK experiences a second day in which more than 50,000 new COVID cases are recorded, the UK government confirms that all adults in the UK have been offered a first vaccine. Around 88% have had their first vaccine and 68% their second.

==== 18 July ====
- Supermarkets are warning they may have to reduce opening hours or even close some branches temporarily, and of a potential shortage of food, as the number of staff being "pinged" by the NHS COVID-19 app, and therefore forced to self-isolate, rises. The situation has been described as a "pingdemic".
- Prime Minister Boris Johnson and Chancellor Rishi Sunak are self-isolating after coming into contact with Health Secretary Sajid Javid. The pair had initially said they would not self-isolate as they were taking part in a pilot scheme involving daily COVID tests, but announced they would self-isolate following criticism from opposition politicians.
- The National Institute for Health Research is to contribute £20m of funding towards 15 studies into the condition of Long COVID and its potential causes and treatments.
- Communities Secretary Robert Jenrick confirms a decision regarding the vaccination of under 18s will be made within days.
- Speaking to the BBC's The Andrew Marr Show, Professor Neil Ferguson claims Britain faces a "difficult summer" with as many as 200,000 COVID cases a day, and potential restrictions returning for the winter.

==== 19 July ====
- The final stage of COVID restrictions are lifted in England, allowing nightclubs to reopen and abolishing social distancing rules, with no limits on how many people can meet or attend events, while the wearing of face coverings is recommended but no longer required by law. The date (originally planned for 21 June) was dubbed "Freedom Day" by some media sources.
- Scotland moves to level zero restrictions, allowing larger numbers of people to meet up indoors, as well as attending weddings and funerals.
- Experts recommend COVID-19 vaccine jabs for some under-18s in the UK. This group includes young people who are less than three months short of their 18th birthday, children who are vulnerable to the COVID virus and children living with adults who are in a high risk group.
- Iceland and Greene King shut sites due to staff being force to isolate by the NHS COVID-19 app.
- Prime Minister Boris Johnson announces that fully vaccinated people in critical jobs in England will be able to continue working if told to self-isolate.
- Dominic Cummings, the former adviser to Prime Minister Boris Johnson, tells the BBC Johnson was reluctant to impose a second lockdown in Autumn 2020 because he believed the people dying from COVID-19 were "essentially all over 80".
- London North Eastern Railway announces plans to carry out a review of policy after attracting criticism for saying it would not enforce social distancing rules when trains cross the border from England. Social distancing of 1m is still required in Scotland. In response to this news, First Minister of Scotland Nicola Sturgeon says that a legal review of the 1m rule will be undertaken to establish whether "clarification or tightening" of the rule is necessary.
- The island of Sark confirms it has recorded its first COVID case. The infected person, who arrived on the island over the previous weekend, was already self-isolating before testing positive and has not been in contact with any other residents.

==== 20 July ====
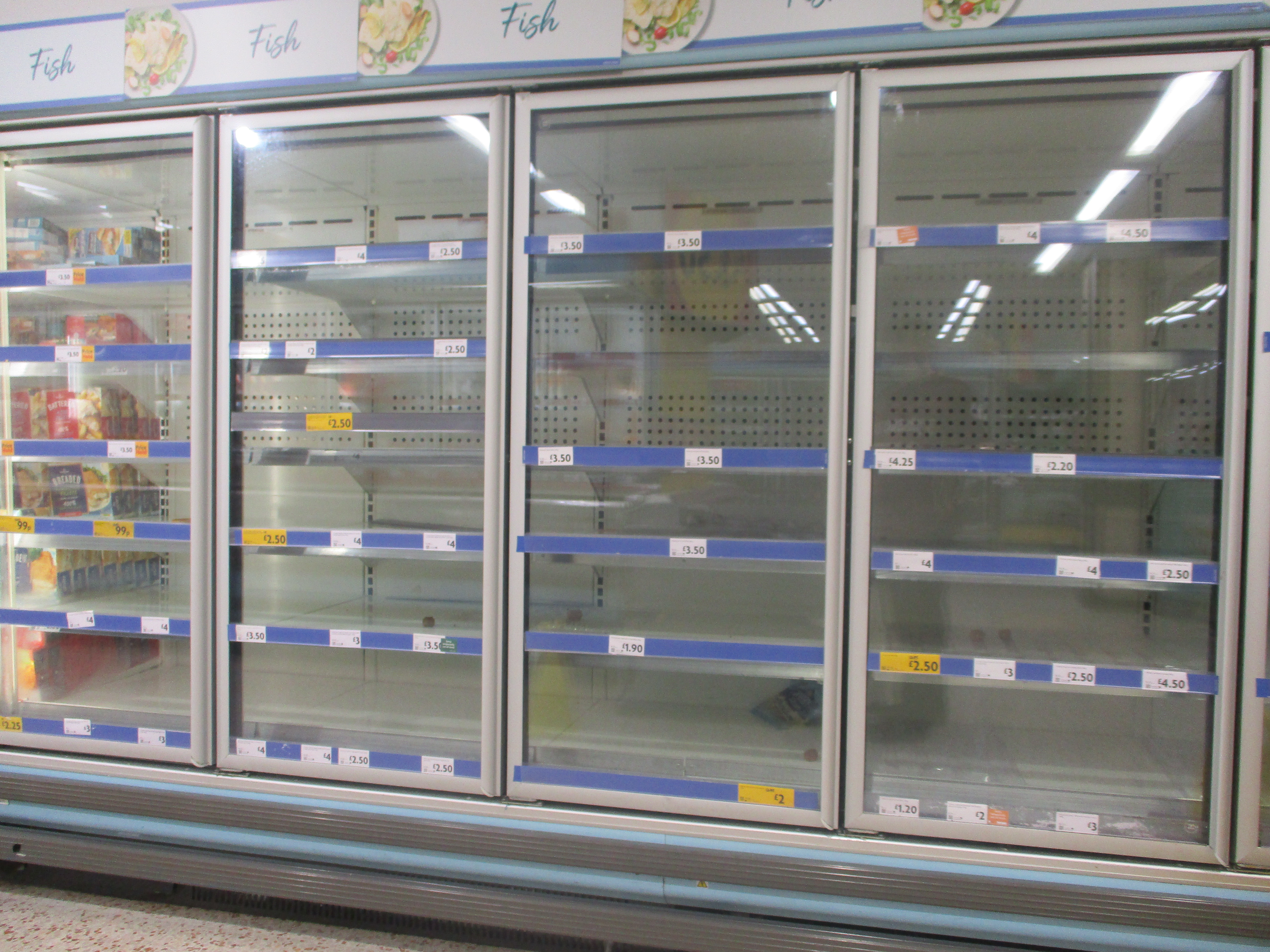
Empty refrigerated cabinets in a Morrisons supermarket in Wetherby on 22 July 2021

- The UK government says there will be a list of critical workers who are exempt from self-isolation, but that individual companies and organisations can apply to have their employees exempted from doing so. Representatives of industries have reacted with dismay to the announcement and questioned whether the scheme is workable.
- Downing Street has said it is "crucial" for people to self-isolate if they are alerted by the NHS COVID-19 app. The advice comes after Business Minister Paul Scully said he would encourage people to self-isolate, but they could make an "informed decision" as to whether or not they choose to isolate.
- Official school attendance figures for England show that 1.7 million pupils (23.3%) were absent from school during the week of 12–16 July. Over a million of those absent were off school for COVID-related reasons, but only 47,000 of those had actually tested positive for the virus.
- First Minister of Scotland Nicola Sturgeon urges the Joint Committee on Vaccination and Immunisation not to rule out giving a COVID vaccine to all teenagers.
- It is reported the UK government is considering making proof of vaccination mandatory for people attending sporting events with more than 20,000 spectators.
- A union official has claimed that travellers arriving from amber and green list countries may no longer face COVID checks on arrival.

==== 21 July ====
- Labour Party leader Sir Keir Starmer self-isolates after one of his children tests positive for COVID.
- At Prime Minister's Questions, Boris Johnson apologises to companies being affected by a rising number of staff absences due to the pingdemic of alerts from the NHS COVID-19 app. He is also urged to apologise for his alleged comments regarding the average age of people dying from COVID.
- A shortage of workers caused by the self-isolation "pingdemic" is reported to be affecting local authorities' ability to carry out refuse collections in some areas of England.
- BP has said a shortage of lorry drivers is causing temporary fuel issues, something it attributes to staff at a supply depot being asked to self-isolate.
- MPs on the Transport Committee have heard that a backlog of 1.4 million cases have built up at the DVLA as a result of decisions by management.
- Data released by the Care Quality Commission shows that 39,000 of the people who died after testing positive for COVID-19 in England between 10 April 2020 and 31 March 2021 were care home residents.
- NHS workers in England are offered a 3% pay rise "in recognition of unique impact of the pandemic" on them.
- The BBC Proms confirms it will have full-capacity audiences for its concerts, having initially planned to allow 1,000 ticketholders for each performance.
- Organisers of the Glastonbury Festival confirm they have decided against plans for a one-off event in the autumn "for a number of reasons", but have not elaborated on their decision.

==== 22 July ====
- The UK government announces that key workers within the food industry, such as supermarket workers and food manufacturers, will be allowed to take daily COVID tests from the following day rather than self-isolating. The announcement comes as supermarkets continue to experience shortages of some products because of the pandemic.
- Figures from Public Health England show the proportion of people in their 20s testing positive in England has reached a record high, with 1,155 people in every 100,000 from that age group over the preceding week.
- A BBC investigation has found that the number of people with eating disorders ending up in hospital has increased during the pandemic, with cases in those aged under 20 rising by 50% when compared to 2019–20.

==== 23 July ====
- The UK records 36,389 new COVID cases, a fall from 20 July when 46,558 cases were recorded, and the third consecutive day on which the number of cases has decreased.
- The start of England's new daily COVID test scheme for food workers is delayed until Monday 26 July.
- Three students from St Andrew's University who have been fully vaccinated, but received their first vaccinations in England and their second in Scotland, have been refused exemption from travel quarantine because NHS Scotland has not logged both jabs.
- England manager Gareth Southgate has recorded a government-endorsed message urging young people to get vaccinated, telling them it is a chance to "get your freedom back".
- The 2021 Latitude Festival, the first major UK music event to be held since the start of the pandemic, gets under way at Henham Park, Suffolk, with 40,000 expected to attend. The four-day event is part of the UK government's Events Research Programme, with festivalgoers required to provide proof of vaccination or a negative COVID test.
- The 2021 Tramlines Festival gets under way at Sheffield, with 120,000 expected to attend over three days.

==== 24 July ====
- The scope of England's planned daily COVID test scheme for key workers is expanded to include police, fire, Border Force, transport and freight staff following criticism it did not go far enough.
- The first Parkrun events to be held in England since March 2020 are staged following the lifting of all restrictions.

==== 25 July ====
- The number of daily COVID cases recorded in the UK continues to fall, with 29,173 new cases recorded, down from 48,161 recorded on 18 July.
- Health Secretary Sajid Javid apologises for his poor word choice after saying the previous day that people should no longer "cower" from COVID-19.
- MPs on the Public Accounts Committee release two reports into the COVID-19 pandemic, and have warned taxpayers will bear the costs of the crisis "for decades".
- The Royal College of Nursing has condemned a "reprehensible" speech made at an anti-lockdown protest in London the previous day in which nursing staff were compared to Nazis executed after World War II. The Metropolitan Police says it is studying video footage of the speech by former nurse Kate Shemirani.

==== 26 July ====
- The number of daily COVID cases falls below 25,000 after a sixth consecutive day of reduced numbers. A total of 24,950 cases are recorded, a drop of 15,000 on the same day the previous week.

==== 27 July ====
- The daily number of new infections falls for the seventh day in a row, roughly halving from the previous week to 23,511. However, 131 deaths are reported, the highest figure since March.
- More workers are to be added to the self-isolation exemption list with a further 1,200 testing sites to be established. Prisons, waste management and the armed forces are among the sectors prioritised.
- The International Monetary Fund has predicted the UK economy will grow faster than originally expected, so upgrades its forecast.
- Analysis of holiday insurance policies by Defaqto highlights the difficulties of having to cancel a holiday after being pinged by the COVID-19 app, with nine in ten of the insurers surveyed willing to honour a claim because of a lost holiday resulting from a positive COVID test, but only six of those willing to do the same for someone required to self-isolate because of an alert from the contact-tracing app.
- Cabinet Office Minister Michael Gove has said that people who turn down a COVID vaccine are "selfish" and put others at risk.
- Figures from the Office for National Statistics show England and Wales to have the highest number of weekly COVID-related deaths since April 2021, with 216 death certificates mentioning the virus in the week to 16 July.

==== 28 July ====
- The UK government confirms that fully vaccinated US and EU citizens arriving into England from an amber list country will no longer be required to quarantine from 4am on Monday 2 August. The changes that international cruises will be able to dock at ports in England from that date. Scotland and Wales also announce changes to their quarantine rules for fully vaccinated US and EU citizens, making arrivals from amber list countries exempt from having to isolate.
- Prime Minister Boris Johnson tells LBC that the lifting of the remaining restrictions for England on 16 August for fully vaccinated people is "nailed on" and will not need a review.
- Katie Rowley, a deaf woman from Leeds, wins a legal case against the UK government over a lack of sign language on two of its daily COVID-19 briefings, something the judge described as having "served to disempower, to frustrate and to marginalise".
- Richard Walker, the boss of Iceland, describes the UK government's COVID testing scheme to prevent people from self-isolating as a "pointless solution" since it excludes supermarket workers.
- Figures produced by the Nationwide Building Society indicate that the housing market slowed slightly during July as a result of the end of the stamp duty holiday, but is still 10.5% higher than July 2020.

==== 29 July ====
- Northern Ireland eases its quarantine rules for fully vaccinated US and EU citizens from Monday 2 August, bringing them into line with England, Scotland and Wales.
- Appearing in a special edition of BBC Radio 1's Newsbeat, Jonathan Van-Tam, Deputy Chief Medical Officer for England, says that the COVID vaccination programme has prevented around 60,000 deaths from the virus, as well as 22 million cases. In the programme, designed to encourage those in the 18 to 25 age bracket to get vaccinated, he says that future lockdowns are less likely as more people are vaccinated against COVID.
- The number of self-isolation alerts from the NHS COVID-19 app rose to a new high of 689,313 in the week up to 21 July, 70,000 higher than the previous week.
- The hospitality industry has been particularly hit by the "pingdemic", with around one in five people employed in that sector self-isolating. It is reported that bar staff are feeling pressured to delete the NHS COVID-19 app as a consequence.
- The Welsh Government announces that fully vaccinated people who are close contacts of someone testing positive for COVID will no longer be required to self-isolate from Saturday 7 August. Under 18s will also be exempt.
- Figures show there were 1.9 million people on the furlough scheme at the end of June 2021, a fall from the peak of the pandemic when almost nine million people were covered by it.
- Foreign Secretary Dominic Raab says university students will get "advance warning" should they be required to have the vaccine before moving into halls of residence.

==== 30 July ====
- The British Retail Consortium reports that the number of empty shops on UK high streets has continued to grow as retailers struggle with the effects of the COVID crisis.
- As Public Health England figures reveal a large number of pregnant women remain unvaccinated, England's chief midwife Jacqueline Dunkley-Bent writes a letter to midwives, obstetricians and GP practices telling them they have "a responsibility to proactively encourage pregnant women" to get vaccinated.
- At a hearing at Westminster Magistrates Court, Lewis Hughes pleads guilty to assaulting England's ChiefMedical Officer, Professor Chris Whitty during an incident at London's St James Park on 27 June. Hughes is sentenced to eight weeks in prison and fined £100. A second man pleads not guilty and iis committed for trial on 23 November.
- The latest NHS hospital data for England indicates that 23% of patients in hospital with COVID were admitted for other reasons.
- Following the Welsh Government's announcement that fully vaccinated people will no longer be required to self-isolate if they come into contact with someone testing positive for COVID-19, Labour Party leader Sir Keir Starmer urges the UK government to bring forward the date for the same changes in England, which are due to come into effect from 16 August.
- Health officials iSuffolk say that 20 people have tested positive for COVID-19 while attending the 2021 Latitude Festival at Hexham Park.
- Data from the Office for National Statistics for the week ending 24 July indicates COVID rates had risen in the UK, with one in 65 estimated to have the virus in England and Northern Ireland, with one in 160 infected in Wales. However, the ONS data also suggests that there are early signs cases may be beginning to fall again in England.

==== 31 July ====
- Medical experts from NHS England and the MHRA are warning that pulse oxygen monitors designed to detect a fall in the level of oxygen in COVID patients work less well on dark-skinned people. This is because the device works by shining a light beam through the blood, which could be absorbed by skin pigmentation.

=== August 2021 ===
==== 1 August ====
- The latest vaccination figures show that 85 million COVID vaccinations have been administered in the United Kingdom.
- The UK government announces plans to offer young people incentives to get vaccinated, including discounts on takeaway food and taxi journeys.

==== 2 August ====
- Plans are announced to tweak the NHS COVID-19 app for England and Wales so that fewer contacts will be advised to self-isolate.
- Following speculation that the UK could introduce an amber travel list of countries that could change to red list status at short notice, Prime Minister Boris Johnson says he wants a "balanced" and "user-friendly" approach to international travel.
- ITV confirms that Series 21 of I'm a Celebrity...Get Me Out of Here! will be filmed in north Wales, the second year the show has taken place there because of COVID travel restrictions.

==== 3 August ====
- Scottish First Minister Nicola Sturgeon confirms that most COVID restrictions in Scotland will be lifted from 9 August.
- Chancellor Rishi Sunak tells LinkedIn he believes working from home could impact negatively on young people because of the benefits working in an office environment provides.

==== 4 August ====
- France is to be removed from England's amber plus list from Sunday 8 August, while other changes are announced. Austria, Germany, Slovenia, Slovakia, Latvia, Romania and Norway are moved from the amber list to the green list, while India, Bahrain, Qatar and the United Arab Emirates are moved from red to amber. Georgia, Mexico, La Reunion and Mayotte are moved from amber to red, while there is no change for Spain which remains on the amber list, but with the advice that returnees from that country should take a PCR test.
- The Joint Committee on Vaccination and Immunisation recommends that all 16 and 17-year-olds should receive a COVID vaccine. They will be offered their first dose of the Pfizer vaccine within weeks, with parental consent to receive the vaccine not required.
- Toy manufacturer Mattel unveils a Barbie doll of Professor Dame Sarah Gilbert, the scientist who designed the Oxford–AstraZeneca vaccine.

==== 5 August ====
- As extra flights are laid on to help bring back an estimated 6,000 British tourists from Mexico, Prime Minister Boris Johnson and Transport Secretary Grant Shapps have defended changes announced to the UK's travel traffic lights system. Johnson says the government has to balance people's desire to travel with the "need to protect us against new variants", while Shapps says that a new plan to review restrictions every three weeks will make for a "simplified system".
- Wales announces the adoption of travel international travel changes in line with those announced for England the previous day, and that will take effect from Sunday 8 August.
- The number of alerts from the NHS COVID-19 app in England and Wales fell by 43% in the final week of July in comparison to the previous week, with almost 396,000 people pinged in that week, compared with 690,129 the week before.
- A government insurance scheme worth £750m is announced to protect music festivals and other live events forced to cancel because of COVID.
- In her first major interview as the new chief executive of NHS England, Amanda Pritchard says that one in every five COVID hospital cases is among people aged 18–34, with about 1,000 younger people experiencing serious illness.

==== 6 August ====
- People aged 16 and 17 are invited to get their first COVID vaccination, with GPs surgeries in England advised they can contact this age group, while invitations to book appointments will be sent out in Wales. Northern Ireland are to make walk-in clinic appointments available for those in the age group.
- 10 Downing Street says that Prime Minister Boris Johnson will not self-isolate after a member of his staff tested positive for COVID during a visit to Scotland. Downing Street says Johnson was not in close proximity to he person, despite reports to the contrary.
- The Edinburgh Fringe Festival returns, having been cancelled in 2020 due to COVID.

==== 7 August ====
- With some exceptions, such as compulsory mask wearing in certain settings, most remaining pandemic related restrictions conclude in Wales.

==== 8 August ====
- Changes to travel rules from France allow fully vaccinated people entering the UK from France exemption from quarantine.
- Health Secretary Sajid Javid asks the Competition and Markets Authority to investigate "excessive" pricing and "exploitative practices" among PCR test firms.
- Scotland unveils its largest ever winter vaccination programme, with four million people set to be offered the flu jab over the coming winter.

==== 9 August ====
- The bulk of pandemic related restrictions are removed in Scotland. Rules that remain include compulsory mask wearing in some locations and restrictions surrounding the administration of schools in the early part of the new academic year.
- It is confirmed that COVID rules for travelling to the UK will be relaxed for around 25,000 delegates scheduled to attend the United Nations COP26 climate summit in Glasgow in November.
- Business Secretary Kwasi Kwarteng dismisses the suggestion civil servants should be paid less if they continue working from home. His comments come after the Daily Mail quoted an unnamed cabinet minister, who said it was unfair for those returning to the office not to be paid more.
- Randox, one of the UK's largest suppliers of PCR tests, commits to providing more drop boxes for the tests after pictures of overflowing boxes appeared online.

==== 10 August ====
- The latest government figures show that 39,688,566 people (75% of the population) have received both COVID vaccines, while a further seven million have received their first vaccine.
- Health Secretary Sajid Javid confirms plans are in place to begin the rollout of a third COVID vaccine for the most vulnerable groups beginning in early September.
- A Level results are published for England, Wales and Northern Ireland, with 44.8% achieving A* or A grades. It is the second year that results have been based on teacher assessment, exams having been cancelled because of COVID. Higher results are published in Scotland, with 87.3% achieving A to C grades.

==== 11 August ====
- Professor Adam Finn has said the UK is moving "cautiously" down the age groups as it decides how many under-18s should receive the vaccine, because of a "delicate balance" between benefits and risks of vaccination.
- The annual Bloodstock Festival returns following its cancellation in 2020 due to COVID.

==== 12 August ====
- GCSE results are published for England, Wales and Northern Ireland, the second year they have been based on teacher assessment because of COVID.
- Figures show that a record number of people are waiting for NHS hospital treatment in England, with a total of 5.45 million on waiting lists.
- Data from the Office for National Statistics shows that the UK economy grew by 4.8% between April and June 2021.
- The Competition & Markets Authority launches an immediate investigation into the cost of PCR tests following concerns about their pricing and "exploitative practices" among test providers.
- Friedrich Joussen, the chief executive of Tui, has said that recovery of the UK holiday sector is lagging behind the rest of Europe, partially due to the ongoing uncertainty over restrictions on travel abroad.
- Travellers begin to gather for the annual Appleby Horse Fair in Cumbria, which was postponed due to COVID, and where health officials plan to establish pop-up vaccination centres to ensure they are vaccinated.

==== 13 August ====
- The UK government announces that the cost of COVID tests for international travellers arriving into the UK will be reduced from £88 to £68. The cost reduction applies to people arriving from green listed countries, and amber list countries when they have been fully vaccinated.
- The UK government asks people who have recently had a COVID test to make a short recording of their cough as part of research into developing an app. They also want people to make voice and breathing recordings.
- Lerwick's annual Up Helly Aa festival, which celebrates the Shetland Islands' Viking history, is cancelled for a second year because of COVID. The winter festival is next scheduled to take place on 31 January 2023.

==== 14 August ====
- Carrie Johnson, the pregnant wife of Prime Minister Boris Johnson, receives her second COVID vaccination, and encourages other pregnant women to get themselves vaccinated.
- The Government of Sark confirms that two people on the island have tested positive for COVID-19 after experiencing symptoms.

==== 15 August ====
- The UK government confirms 23 August as the date by which all 16 and 17-year-olds will in England will have been offered a COVID vaccine, or the chance to book an appointment.
- Ferry operator Caledonian MacBrayne cancels its Campbeltown to Ardrossan service after two crew members tested positive for COVID. The MV Caledonian Isles will be deep cleaned during the suspension of crossings.

==== 16 August ====
- People in England and Northern Ireland who have received both vaccines, and those aged under 18, are no longer required to self-isolate if they have been in contact with someone who has tested positive for COVID-19. Instead they are advised to take a PCR test, wear a face covering indoors, and limit their contact with anyone classed as clinically vulnerable.
- Tom Russell, UK operations manager for TMD Friction, one of the world's largest manufacturers of brake pads, has highlighted the problems faced by businesses whose staff were being alerted by the NHS COVID-19 app. As many of 15% of the company's employees were absent from work at one point because of the "pingdemic" caused by the app, and the firm came close to having to close down operations.
- Andrew Tyrie, former chairman of the Competition & Markets Authority describes PCR tests as "a predictable Covid rip-off".

==== 17 August ====
- The Medicines and Healthcare products Regulatory Agency (MHRA) approves use of the Moderna vaccine for children aged 12–17.
- A further 26,852 daily cases are reported, along with 170 deaths.
- With the online ordering of takeaway food having become more popular during the pandemic, the Information Commissioner's Office warns customers to think carefully about handing over personal data when ordering food and drink via their mobile phones.
- Six of the UK's teaching unions have written to Education Secretary Gavin Williamson to call for urgent action for better ventilation in schools in England amid concerns about a rise in COVID cases when pupils return to the classroom for the new academic year.
- Figures from the Office for National Statistics indicate a record number of job vacancies, with 953,000 vacancies in the three months to July, while unemployment fell by 4.7% in the three months to June.
- Fast food chain Nando's has temporarily closed 50 of its outlets after running short of chicken following the effect of the "pingdemic" on supplies.
- The developers of the AstraZeneca vaccine have given volunteers the first dose of a new plague vaccine.
- The Scottish Government launches a consultation process making some of its emergency COVID powers permanent. The Coronavirus (Scotland) Act 2020 is due to expire in March 2022, but the Scottish Government would like to retain some powers, such as the ability to impose lockdowns, close schools, make it more difficult for landlords to evict tenants and release prisoners early.

==== 18 August ====
- Parliament is recalled to discuss the situation in Afghanistan, and the House of Commons is full for the first time since March 2020. Most Conservative MPs choose not to wear face coverings despite government advice for people to wear them in enclosed spaces.
- A study, the largest of its kind, finds that the best protection against Indian variant COVID is to have both doses of COVID vaccine, with both the Pfizer and Astrazeneca vaccines offering high protection.
- After falling for several weeks, the data shows a slight rise in COVID cases, with the daily average for the preceding seven days standing at 30,177.
- A judge is to decide whether a woman left brain damaged and paralysed from the neck down after being ill with COVID-19 should be allowed to die. Doctors at Addenbrookes Hospital believe the patient should be taken off life support, but her family disagree so the matter will be heard in the Court of Protection.

==== 19 August ====
- Health Secretary Sajid Javid confirms a COVID jab booster programme will take place, with September set as a provisional date for it to begin.
- Scientists at Imperial College London have detected irregularities in the blood of Long COVID patients that could lead to the development of a test for the condition.

==== 20 August ====
- Ronapreve, a drug that uses a pair of laboratory created COVID antibodies to treat the virus, is approved for use in the UK. It is shown to lower hospitalisation or mortality by 70% and to shorten the duration of COVID symptoms by four days.
- Figures show the number of people "pinged" by the NHS COVID-19 app fell dramatically in the week to 13 August, the first full week following modifications to the software, with 261,453 people receiving self-isolation alerts.
- Optometrists have reported an increase in the number of children being diagnosed with myopia since the start of the pandemic, which is attributed to the increased amount of time they have spent using electronic devices.
- Official figures have shown government borrowing to be at £10.4bn in July 2021, £10.1bn less than the same month in 2020. The fall has been helped by the reopening of the economy as restrictions were eased in England and other parts of the UK.
- Data from the UK government's COVID pilot scheme shows major events such as sporting events "can be conducted safely".
- Figures show that UK box office takings for the first month without COVID restrictions were half their pre-pandemic levels as many people continue to be cautious about visiting indoor venues such as cinemas.

==== 21 August ====
- Schools in England are to be provided with around 800,000 carbon dioxide monitors to help improve ventilation and lessen the number of COVID cases.
- A report by the Resolution Foundation argues that the stamp duty holiday is not responsible for the rise in house prices following the pandemic, but instead the rise is due to low interest rates and changing home preferences.

==== 22 August ====
- Antibody tests are to be made widely available in the UK for the first time as part of a government study to determine how much natural protection people have after contracting COVID.

==== 23 August ====
- The UK government orders a further 35 million doses of the Pfizer vaccine to be delivered in the second half of 2022.
- Health Secretary Sajid Javid announces that more than 80 private COVID travel test providers listed on the GOV.UK website will be issued with a two-strikes warning over misleading prices.
- Cornwall Council has said that as many as 4,700 COVID cases may be linked to the Boardmasters Festival held in the county between 11 and 15 August, with more expected to be identified in the coming days.
- A video released by the NHS urging young people to have the vaccine features three people talking about the effects of Long COVID and their personal experiences with the condition.

==== 24 August ====
- As Scotland reports a record 4,323 daily cases, First Minister Nicola Sturgeon says she cannot rule out the reintroduction of some COVID measures, but says these would be as limited and proportional as possible.
- The Scottish Government announces plans to hold a separate public inquiry into the handling of the COVID crisis in Scotland, expected to be at the end of the year.
- As COVID cases rise in Cornwall, the county's tourist board asks people to stay away from the area unless they have pre-booked holidays.
- Data from the Office for National Statistics for the week ending 13 August indicates the number of COVID deaths in England and Wales were at their highest since late March, with 571 death certificates mentioning COVID during that week, an 8% increase from the previous week; the figures are compared to the week ending 26 March when 719 deaths were recorded.
- McDonald's has become the latest food outlet to be troubled by supply chain issues because of the pandemic after running out of milkshake.
- Health figures show that more than 1,000 people who attended July's Latitude Festival went on to test positive for COVID.

==== 25 August ====
- A study of more than a million people shows a decrease in the effectiveness of COVID vaccinations after a few months, with the Pfizer vaccine decreasing from 88% after one month to 74% after five to six months, and the AstraZeneca vaccine decreasing from 77% to 67% after four to five months. Scientists say some decrease in effectiveness is to be expected.
- Scotland's Deputy First Minister, John Swinney, says the surge in cases in Scotland is partly due to the return of schools.
- Premier Foods announce the adoption of a hybrid working model for its 800 office staff, enabling them to choose whether to work at home or the office.
- Analysis by Which? for BBC's Panorama TV series has indicated UK holidaymakers are paying an average of £300 more for a holiday in the UK than compared to 2019.
- Welsh Secretary Simon Hart has spoken about how senior Cabinet ministers feared Prime Minister Boris Johnson would die when he was admitted to hospital with COVID-19 in April 2020.

==== 26 August ====
- Following an inquest into the death of radio presenter Lisa Shaw, Newcastle upon Tyne coroner Karen Dilks has concluded the cause of death was as a result of an extremely rare "vaccine-induced thrombotic thrombocytopenia", a condition which leads to a brain haemorrhage. Shaw died in May after becoming ill a week after receiving the first dose of AstraZeneca vaccine.
- Canada, Denmark, Finland, the Azores, Switzerland, Liechtenstein and Lithuania are to move to the "green" travel list from 4am on Monday 30 August, while Thailand and Montenegro will move to the "red" list from the same date.
- NHS organisations in England have been told to prepare for a possible extension of the COVID vaccination programme to 12–15-year-olds. But the Joint Committee on Vaccination and Immunisation is reported to have concerns about the effect of the COVID vaccine on other vaccines administered to young children.
- Figures show that in July 2021, the UK car industry produced fewer cars than in any other July since 1956. The drop in production is associated with staff shortages brought about by the "pingdemic".
- The latest figures from Public Health England indicate COVID cases are on the rise again in most areas of England, apart from London and Yorkshire and the Humber, where they have fallen.

==== 27 August ====
- The first Reading Festival to be held since 2019 gets under way, with 100,000 expected to attend over three days.
- The spending limit on each use of a contactless card is to rise from £45 to £100 from 15 October, it is confirmed.
- The i newspaper reports that Prime Minister Boris Johnson has devised a cost-benefit analysis to determine whether the UK should enter another lockdown, with restrictions returning if the reported number of COVID-related deaths looks like surpassing 50,000 over the course of a year, with 30,000 deaths an accepted level. The report, which quotes a government adviser, is denied by Downing Street.
- Scientists advising the UK government believe it is "highly likely" there will be high levels of COVID in schools in England by the end of September.
- Scotland records 6,835 new COVID cases, the highest daily increase to date and the third in a week, but First Minister Nicola Sturgeon says the Scottish Government is not considering the introduction of a circuit-breaker lockdown.
- A University of Oxford study concludes that although the AstraZeneca vaccine raises the risk of blood clots and another condition that causes severe bleeding, the risk of these effects is much greater from COVID.
- A Bristol study into the side-effects of the Pfizer vaccine in children aged 12–15 at high risk of COVID are minimal and clear up quickly.

==== 28 August ====
- A study published in The Lancet indicates that someone infected with Indian variant COVID (now referred to as the Delta variant) is twice as likely to end up in hospital than someone with the Alpha variant.
- An organiser of illegal raves known by the pseudonym Joy Circuit warns that the popularity of illegal raves could grow if nightclubs introduce vaccine passports.

==== 29 August ====
- A record number of daily COVID cases is recorded in Scotland, with 7,113 new cases reported. The news comes as Scottish Health Secretary Humza Yousaf says that the NHS in Scotland is facing a "perfect storm".
- Scotland's First Minister, Nicola Sturgeon, self-isolates after being identified as a close contact of someone who tested positive for COVID. She is released from the requirement the following day after providing a negative test.

==== 30 August ====
- Figures indicate COVID cases in Scotland have virtually doubled each week since the lifting of restrictions, leading to an increase in hospitalisations, and prompting the country's National Clinical Director Professor Jason Leitch to suggest a "reverse gear" may be needed with some restrictions.
- The devolved governments of Scotland, Wales and Northern Ireland have urged the UK government to extend the temporary £20 uplift in Universal Credit payments due to end in October.
- The Welsh Government announces a £6million technology fund aimed at stopping the spread of COVID-19 in schools, colleges and universities in Wales, which will seem them pay for 30,000 carbon dioxide sensors and 1,800 ozone disinfecting machines developed by Swansea University.
- The Trades Union Congress is calling for workers in England and Wales to be given an extra bank holiday between September and Christmas, saying it would be "a great way to thank working Britain for getting us through these tough times".

==== 31 August ====
- Michelle O'Neill, the Deputy First Minister of Northern Ireland, confirms she is self-isolating after testing positive for COVID-19.
- Death figures released by National Records of Scotland appear to show the pandemic has widened the gap between those living in deprived areas of Scotland and those living in more affluent areas, with deaths registered in 2020 for deprived areas double those of other areas.
- A business survey conducted by Lloyds Bank indicates confidence is at a level last seen in April 2017, with businesses feeling upbeat about economic recovery following the pandemic.
- The Independent reports that health officials are holding back on giving the green light for full vaccination for teenagers amid concerns it could disrupt the booster programme for vulnerable older people.

=== September 2021 ===
==== 1 September ====
- The Joint Committee on Vaccination and Immunisation recommends people with weakened immune systems should be prioritised for a third COVID vaccine, with a separate booster scheme beginning later. This group includes an estimated 400,000 to 500,000 people with conditions such as blood cancer, advanced HIV, and those who have recently received organ or stem cell transplants.
- Portugal changes its quarantine rules for UK tourists, meaning anyone arriving from the UK will not need to quarantine if they are not fully vaccinated, and can provide a negative PCR test instead.
- A study carried out by Great Ormand Street Institute of Child Health indicates the risk of Long COVID in children is much lower than many had feared.
- Scottish First Minister Nicola Sturgeon confirms that vaccine passports will be required for people who wish to enter nightclubs and attend large events in Scotland. The practicality of the plans are questioned by the Scottish Professional Football League, which says they could have unintended consequences.
- Figures from the Office for National Statistics show the number of COVID-related deaths in Wales have passed 8,000, with the latest weekly figures showing 18 deaths which took the total to 8,002.
- Pub chain Wetherspoons says that the shortage of drivers partially brought about by the pandemic has led to them running out of certain kinds of beer.
- The Tour de Yorkshire cycle race is cancelled for 2022, the third year it has been cancelled, due to "escalating financial challenges and uncertainties".

==== 2 September ====
- At least 18 UK councils have confirmed they are having ongoing problems with their refuse collection due to the shortage of drivers.
- Fitness chain Gym Group reports that young people short of space at home have helped to drive a "rapid recovery" in their membership numbers, which have increased by a third since February, with two thirds of their members now under 34.
- Organisers of the Great North Run, scheduled for 12 September, have chosen four health workers to start the race in celebration of the NHS and its role during the COVID pandemic.

==== 3 September ====
- The Joint Committee on Vaccination and Immunisation decides against recommending COVID vaccinations for healthy children aged 12−15, saying the benefits of doing so would only be marginal.
- Seqirus, one of the world's largest suppliers of flu vaccines, and a major supplier to the NHS, says that there will be a delay in delivering vaccines to GPs surgeries this year because of the shortage in HGV drivers.
- Accolade, suppliers of Hardy's wine, becomes the latest company to be affected by the driver shortage, and warns of potential shortages at Christmas.
- Anti-vaccine demonstrators attempt to storm the headquarters of the Medicines and Healthcare products Regulatory Agency in Central London; four police officers are injured in the incident.
- The Court of Protection rules that a woman left paralysed and brain damaged after falling ill with COVID should be allowed to die; medics at Addenbrookes Hospital want to withdraw life support from the patient in her 50s, but her family had disagreed.

==== 4 September ====
- The UK's chief medical officers have been asked to consider the wider implications of extending the vaccine programme to younger children, prompting the opposition Labour Party to call for clarity on the topic.
- Larry Flanagan, general secretary of the Education Institute of Scotland, has described the decision not to vaccinate younger children as "unethical".

==== 5 September ====
- Vaccines Minister Nadhim Zahawi confirms that vaccine passports will be required for nightclubs and other indoor venues in England from the end of September.
- BBC News reports that opposition to a vaccine passport scheme in Scotland is growing, with Scottish Labour saying it will not support the proposals, which are scheduled to be debated in the Scottish Parliament on 9 September.
- The Resolution Foundation think tank predicts that job creation will remain strong after the furlough scheme ends at the end of September, but that there is a risk of a rise in unemployment.
- Ministers are reported to be consulting on plans to allow the continuation of some outdoor hospitality on a permanent basis, with extra seating introduced during the pandemic to be allowed, but al fresco street dining to end. Street markets may also be allowed to open all year round under the plans.
- Ikea becomes the latest company to be affected by the shortage of HGV drivers, and says it is struggling to supply around 1,000 of its products.
- A senior government source tells the BBC that an extra £5.5bn will be allocated to the NHS over the coming winter to help with the backlog that has built up due to the COVID crisis.

==== 6 September ====
- The total number of confirmed COVID infections since the start of the pandemic exceeds 7 million after a further 41,192 cases are recorded, taking the total to 7,018,927.
- The UK government confirms the NHS in England will get an extra £5.4bn over the coming six months to help deal with the backlog caused by COVID, and to help with its response to the pandemic.
- BBC News reports on how pupils are returning to school after the summer holidays with the majority of COVID restrictions lifted.
- Dr Richard Stanton, a virologist at Cardiff University, has called for all teenagers to be given a COVID vaccine in order to prevent the dangers of them developing Long COVID.

==== 7 September ====
- An unnamed government scientist tells the i newspaper that the government has devised plans for a firebreak lockdown during the October half-term if COVID hospitalisations threaten to overload the NHS. In response the government denies that any such plans have been made.
- Addressing the House of Commons, Prime Minister Boris Johnson announces a new Health and Social Care Tax worth £12bn designed to deal with the backlog caused by COVID and improve social care in England.
- Scottish First Minister Nicola Sturgeon confirms that work will resume on plans for a second independence referendum, which had been suspended during the COVID crisis.

==== 8 September ====
- MPs vote in favour of the government's NHS and social care tax rise plan by 319 votes to 248, a majority of 71.
- Prime Minister Boris Johnson describes the rise in COVID hospitalisations among unvaccinated people as "concerning".
- The BBC reports that the UK government plans to overhaul the traffic lights system for travel.
- Scottish First Minister Nicola Sturgeon says the rate of COVID infections in Scotland may be slowing down, and that hopefully no new restrictions will be needed to control the surge.
- Bosses at pharmaceutical company AstraZeneca warn that moving too quickly to offer people booster COVID vaccines could risk depriving them of the opportunity to study data on the effectiveness of the vaccine.
- Official figures have revealed that people in the north of England were 17% more likely to die from COVID-related illnesses than those in the rest of the country.

==== 9 September ====
- The Scottish Parliament votes to approve vaccine passports, meaning adults must be fully vaccinated to enter nightclubs and major events from 1 October.
- Figures show that 5.6 million people were on NHS England's waiting lists in July, while the average waiting time for an ambulance during a life-threatening call was eight and a half minutes in August; the target is seven minutes.
- The Medicines and Healthcare products Regulatory Agency (MHRA) approves the AstraZeneca vaccine and Pfizer vaccine for use in a booster jab programme.
- Education Secretary Gavin Williamson urges UK universities to give students face-to-face teaching when the new academic year begins.
- Scottish Comedian Janey Godley is dropped from a Scottish Government health campaign urging people to wear face coverings and take lateral flow tests after historic tweets were published in which she made derogatory comments about a number of black performers.

==== 10 September ====
- Professor Dame Sarah Gilbert, the scientist who developed the AstraZeneca vaccine, tells the BBC the vaccine is still providing good protection a year on from the two initial doses, and questions whether booster jabs should be prioritised over providing help to developing nations. In response to her comments, a spokesman for Prime Minister Boris Johnson says the UK can give boosters and donate vaccines to poorer countries.
- Figures from the Office for National Statistics show the UK economy grew by 0.6% in July, the sixth consecutive month of growth, but the increase was dented by the "pingdemic" which kept many workers at home.
- Dogs Trust reports a 35% increase in calls from people wishing to give up their pet dogs since the lifting of restrictions. The sale of pets increased significantly during the pandemic as people stayed at home.
- The UK government confirms plans to speed up the process of obtaining a HGV licence in order to help deal with the shortage of lorry drivers.

==== 12 September ====
- Speaking on BBC One's The Andrew Marr Show, Health Secretary Sajid Javid confirms plans to introduce vaccine passports for nightclubs and other venues in England have been scrapped. 10 Downing Street says the plans will be kept "in reserve".
- HM Revenue and Customs predicts the Health and Social Care Tax will have a "significant" impact on wages, inflation, and company profits, and could also lead to the breakdown of families. In response, Javid says it is the fairest way to fund investment.
- The 2021 Great North Run is held in Tyneside, the first time the event has taken place since 2019 after the 2020 event was cancelled due to COVID.
- Michael O'Leary, the CEO of Ryanair, tells The Sunday Times that an increase in demand for holidays abroad will push up the price of flights during 2022.

==== 13 September ====
- French pharmaceutical company Valneva says the UK government has cancelled an order for 100 million doses of its COVID vaccine over an alleged breach of contract, which the company "strenuously denies". Speaking about the decision the following day, Health Secretary Sajid Javid says the vaccine would not have received regulatory approval for use in the UK.
- The UK's four chief medical officers recommend that healthy children aged 12–15 should be offered a single dose of COVID vaccine. Vaccines Minister Nadhim Zahawi subsequently confirms all children in this age group will be offered a single vaccine.
- Figures obtained by the BC indicate that as many as 300,000 people who arrived into the UK between March and May 2021 may have broken quarantine rules, roughly a third of those who travelled to the UK during that time. In response the UK government says it cannot be sure how many of them actually broke quarantine and how many could not be traced.
- Speaking on BBC Breakfast, Secretary of State for Work and Pensions Therese Coffey gives her backing to plans to end the £20 uplift in Universal Credit, saying removing it amounts to "two hours' extra work every week" for claimants and that the government would help them to "perhaps secure those extra hours". On the same topic, Scottish First Minister Nicola Sturgeon uses her Scottish National Party conference speech to urge Prime Minister Boris Johnson not to end the uplift as it threatens to plunge tens of thousands of people into poverty.
- Figures produced by the Office for National Statistics indicate fully vaccinated people are much less likely to die from COVID-19 compared to those who are unvaccinated, with only 256 of the 51,000 COVID deaths in England between January and July 2021 occurring in people who had been fully vaccinated. These deaths were mostly people at very high risk of illness due to the virus.

==== 14 September ====
- Prime Minister Boris Johnson and Health Secretary Sajid Javid unveil the COVID Winter Plan for England, which includes a Plan A and a Plan B, the former designed to prevent the NHS from coming under pressure, and the latter designed to be enacted as a last resort if the NHS does come under pressure.

Plan A includes the following measures:
- Encouraging those yet to be vaccinated to get vaccinated
- Offer vaccines to children aged between 12 and 15
- Begin a booster jab programme
Plan B includes the following measures:
- Urge the public to act more cautiously
- The introduction of mandatory vaccine passports for large events
- A return of the legal requirement for face coverings in some indoor settings
- Possible advice to work from home
- Lockdown as a last resort.

- Health Secretary Sajid Javid announces that a booster jab programme for 30 million people will begin the following week.
- Pressure group Lawyers for Liberty warns schools that staff could face legal action from parents if they take an active role in the drive to vaccinate children.
- The Health and Social Care Levy Bill, the legislation enacting the Health and Social Care Tax, passes its third reading in the House of Commons with MPs voting 307–251 in favour, a majority of 56.
- England's Chief Medical Officer, Professor Chris Whitty, criticises US rapper Nicki Minaj after she posted a series of tweets claiming her cousin would not get the COVID vaccine because his friend's testicles had become swollen as a side effect of the jab.
- Figures from the Office for National Statistics show that job vacancies rose above one million in the three months to August for the first time since records began in 2001. The number of employees in August was also back to pre-COVID levels.

==== 15 September ====
- Health Secretary Sajid Javid tells the BBC that an increase in pressure on the NHS is the main factor that would lead to tighter COVID restrictions in England.
- The Consumer Price Index jumps from 2 to 3.2%, its biggest increase since 1997.
- Prime Minister Boris Johnson reshuffles his cabinet. Chances include promotion for Vaccines Minister Nadhim Zahawi, who replaces Gavin Williamson as Education Secretary, while also maintaining the Vaccines Minister role.
- A BBC survey indicates that most people believe workers will not return full time to the office after COVID.

==== 16 September ====
- The booster vaccination program begins in England and Wales, starting with NHS staff.
- The Scottish Government asks the Ministry of Defence for military assistance for Scotland's ambulance service after First Minister Nicola Sturgeon describes the situation as being the most challenging set of circumstances in history because of COVID. The Northern Ireland Executive has asked the Ministry of Defence for military medics to be deployed to hospitals in Northern Ireland in October.
- Prime Minister Boris Johnson continues his cabinet reshuffle which includes minor changes to junior health ministers.

==== 17 September ====
- The UK government confirms an overhaul of the traffic lights system, which will see the green and amber lists scrapped from 4 October in favour of a single red list. The changes will also mean fully vaccinated people are no longer required to take a pre-departure PCR test before boarding a flight to the UK, unless from a red list country. The Day 2 PCR test for returning travellers will be replaced by a lateral flow test from a point later in October. Eight countries are also to be removed from the red list from Wednesday 22 September.
- The Scottish Government agrees to the traffic lights system changes, but wants to keep the testing requirements.
- The Welsh Government announces the introduction of vaccine passports for nightclubs and large scale events in Wales from 11 October.
- Figures show that retail sales in the UK have fallen for a fourth consecutive month as people spend more time eating and drinking out.
- The latest Office for National Statistics figures for the week ending 11 September indicate Scotland to still have the highest COVID rate in the UK, with an estimated one in 45 people with the virus, the second week this has been the case.

==== 18 September ====
- A surge in holiday bookings is reported following the UK government's announcement of changes to the travel rules for England.
- Older people, those with Down's Syndrome, and weakened immune systems are among those identified as at high risk of illness from COVID despite vaccination by a calculator developed by researchers.
- Following changes to the traffic lights system in England, Scotland announces that the green and amber lists will merge, but unlike England there will be no changes to the rules regarding COVID tests for returning travellers. Northern Ireland also announces similar changes, effective from 4 October.
- Anne Webb, an 85-year-old nursing home resident from Treorchy, Wales, is believed to be the UK's first nursing home resident to receive a third COVID vaccine.

==== 19 September ====
- The Office for Students urges universities in England to consult students before deciding how much should be taught online.

==== 20 September ====
- The United States confirms plans to lift travel restrictions for fully vaccinated UK and EU citizens from November.
- Prime Minister Boris Johnson says Britain's vaccine priority must be to roll out booster jabs rather than giving surplus supplies to developing nations, but says this "doesn't mean we're not making also a massive commitment to the rest of the world".
- Ronapreve becomes a treatment for the "most vulnerable" hospital patients unable to build up an antibody response to COVID.
- The Welsh Ambulance Service becomes the latest UK ambulance service to ask for help from the military due to increased pressure because of COVID.
- Welsh Labour has called off its party conference, scheduled for 5–7 November, due to concerns about rising COVID cases.

==== 21 September ====
- After Business Secretary Kwasi Kwarteng warns that some households face a "very difficult winter" with food shortages and rising fuel prices, Prime Minister Boris Johnson says people should not worry about putting food on the table this winter.
- Scottish First Minister Nicola Sturgeon outlines details of when and where vaccine passports should be used, and urges venues to use "common sense" when checking them.
- The Ministry of Defence confirms the deployment of 114 military personnel to help the Scottish Ambulance Service with non-essential driving and support work.
- Welsh First Minister Mark Drakeford urges the UK government to keep PCR tests for returning international travellers; changes are scheduled to be made to the rules in October.
- The Chelsea Flower Show gets underway for a rare autumn appearance, having been delayed from May due to COVID.
- Network Rail says that the number of people wearing masks at railway stations in England has fallen to 20%, compared to 80% before restrictions were lifted on 19 July.
- BBC News reports the UK government is proposing to give all workers the right to request flexible working from their first day in a job, allowing them to work from home.

==== 22 September ====
- Turkey, Pakistan, the Maldives, Egypt, Sri Lanka, Oman, Bangladesh and Kenya are removed from the travel red list.
- The Night Time Industries Association Scotland (NTIA), a group representing night clubs in Scotland, confirms plans for a legal challenge against the Scottish Government's decision to introduce vaccine passports from October, saying there are "serious flaws" with the scheme.
- The UK government amends its guidance to clarify that Covishield, India's version of the AstraZeneca vaccine, is an approved jab. The vaccine had previously been omitted from a published list of approved vaccines, something that attracted criticism from MPs and from India itself.
- An inquest into the death of Yorkshire Ripper Peter Sutcliffe, who died after catching COVID-19 in prison, hears that he refused to shield before contracting the illness.
- Scientists report that a COVID-19 treatment made from nanobodies, a version of antibodies produced by llamas and camels in response to infection, is showing positive results.

==== 23 September ====
- BP warns of the temporary closure of some of its filling stations due to a shortage of lorry drivers.
- Figures produced by the Office for National Statistics indicate life expectancy for men in the UK has fallen for the first time in 40 years, with the average age being 79 in 2020, a figure last seen between 2012 and 2014 The figure for women in 2020 was 83, and remained relatively unchanged.
- Wales once again produces the worst performance figures for hospital emergency department waiting times, with only 40.7% of patients attending A&E at one hospital being seen within four hours.
- Andrew Monk, chief executive of investment firm VSA Capital, criticises government plans to give new workers the right to work from home, saying that people abuse the practice.
- Around 250 people gather at Stonehenge to celebrate the Autumn equinox as such gatherings are once again allowed.
- Dr John Nkengasong, director of Africa's Centers for Disease Control and Prevention, warns that the UK's policy of not accepting COVID certificates from some countries could exacerbate vaccine hesitancy.

==== 24 September ====
- Margaret Keenan, the first person in the UK to receive the COVID vaccination, is given her booster jab at University Hospital Coventry.
- The UK government is reported to be working on a temporary visa scheme to make it easier for foreign lorry drivers to come to the UK and help with the shortage of lorry drivers.
- England's R number falls slightly to between 0.8 and 1.0, down from 0.9 to 1.1 the previous week.
- The Scottish Government confirms fully vaccinated travellers returning to Scotland will no longer be required to take a pre-flight COVID test. Scotland will also align itself with the rest of the UK with regard to post-return testing. The Northern Ireland Executive also announces plans to bring its travel testing inline with the rest of the UK.
- A report by the Institute for Public Policy Research suggests it could take up to a decade to clear the backlog of cancer patients waiting for treatment in England.
- A Freedom of Information request reveals the Welsh Government spent £32,000 on an advertising campaign featuring rappers Goldie Lookin' Chain aimed at encouraging people to get vaccinated. This includes paying the band to write the song "Get the Jab Done". The Welsh Government also had a final say on the lyrics.

==== 25 September ====
- The UK government confirms that 5,000 foreign fuel tanker and food lorry drivers and 5,500 poultry workers will be given temporary visas to work in the UK for three months, until Christmas Eve. Other measures announced include using Ministry of Defence examiners to increase teaching capacity for HGV licence training, and writing to one million people who hold a HGV licence to encourage them to return to the industry.

==== 26 September ====
- Transport Secretary Grant Shapps says there is "no shortage of fuel" and people should be "sensible" and fill up only when they need to.
- As panic buying of fuel continues, the UK government announces it is suspending competition law to allow oil distribution firms to work together to distribute fuel to petrol stations. The announcement comes as the Petrol Retailers Association warns that two thirds of its 5,500 outlets have run out of fuel, while the rest are about to do so.
- Strictly Come Dancing contestant Tom Fletcher and dance partner Amy Dowden test positive for COVID a day after the series' first live show, meaning they will miss the next weekend's edition of the programme.

==== 27 September ====
- Following a spate of panic buying during the fuel supply crisis over preceding days, the fuel industry forecasts supplies should return to normal levels in the coming days.
- The UK government confirms members of the armed forces are on standby to help deliver fuel and ease pressure at garage forecourts should they be required.
- Prime Minister Boris Johnson agrees to meet members of the campaign group Covid-19 Bereaved Families for Justice at a private reception in 10 Downing Street the next day. He had previously declined to meet the group in 2020.
- The Northern Ireland Executive agrees to end social distancing restrictions for shops, theatres and a number of other indoor settings in Northern Ireland from 6pm on 30 September.
- Headteachers in England have warned of fake vaccine consent letters being sent to parents that aim to spread anti-vaccine messages.
- The Welsh Government agrees to partially align its COVID travel rules with England from 4 October by merging the green and amber lists and scrapping the pre-departure tests, but remains undecided on whether to change the rules regarding PCR tests after arrival.

==== 28 September ====
- A poll of 27,000 schoolchildren and young people in England aged 9 to 18 indicates that most are willing or eager to have the COVID vaccine.
- Prime Minister Boris Johnson says the fuel situation in the UK is beginning to improve, and urges people to buy fuel in the "normal way".
- Prime Minister Boris Johnson meets representatives of the campaign group Covid-19 Bereaved Families for Justice and promises to appoint a chair of the COVID-19 public inquiry before Christmas.
- An Oxford University study finds that people can suffer from "long flu" in the same way they can suffer from "Long COVID".
- With vaccine passports set to be introduced in Scotland on 1 October, First Minister Nicola Sturgeon announces there will be a "grace period" before their enforcement on 18 October.
- The Welsh Government confirms 5 October as the start date for its COVID pass scheme for large events, and announces that it will be a criminal offence to fake a lateral flow test for a COVID pass.

==== 29 September ====
- The UK government begins deploying its reserve tanker fleet to help with fuel deliveries.

==== 30 September ====
- The Coronavirus Job Retention Scheme reaches its final day, with the Resolution Foundation estimating around one million people have still not fully returned to work and consequently face an uncertain future.
- Chancellor Rishi Sunak announces a £500m package of grants to help vulnerable households over the winter with essentials such as food, clothing and utilities.
- At 6pm, social distancing restrictions for shops, theatres and a number of other indoor settings come to an end in Northern Ireland. Instead some indoor venues are asked to voluntarily introduce rules such as proof of double vaccination or a negative lateral flow test.
- A survey by NHS Digital suggests children's and young people's mental health has not improved since the first lockdown, with girls more affected than boys.
- The Petrol Retailers Association says there has been no improvement in supplies for independent retailers since the previous day.
- A legal challenge against Scotland's vaccine passport scheme is rejected, meaning it will begin the following day. The NHS Scotland Covid Status app is subsequently launched at 5.30pm but runs into technical difficulties within hours of going live.
- Data shows the level of face-to-face GP appointments in England has changed little since the winter lockdown, with 58% of appointments conducted in person during August 2021; this compares with 54% in January and a pre-COVID level of 80%.
- Data from Nationwide Building Society indicates house prices rose by 10% during September 2021.
- The UK government confirms that GCSE and A Level examination grades in England will be returned to pre-COVID levels over the next two years.
- The James Bond film No Time to Die, the premiere of which was delayed repeatedly due to COVID, finally gets its cinema release.

=== October 2021 ===
==== 1 October ====
- The UK government confirms that around 200 military personnel will begin delivering petrol to garages from Monday 4 October.
- Figures from the Office for National Statistics suggest that one in 20 secondary school age children is infected with COVID.
- India announces the imposing of a mandatory ten day quarantine on all travellers arriving from the UK, even if they are fully vaccinated, beginning from Monday 4 October.
- Scotland's Health Secretary Humza Yousaf says he "regrets any inconvenience caused" by the vaccine passport app and suggests it could be fixed "in a matter of hours, but it may be a matter of days".
- JD Wetherspoon reports a record annual loss of £154.7m after its pubs were closed for 19 weeks due to lockdowns in late 2020 and early 2021.
- The temporary VAT reduction from 20% to 5% for hospitality sector businesses comes to an end, rising to 12.5% until April 2022, when it will return to its pre-COVID level

==== 2 October ====
- The Petrol Retailers Association reports a "distinct improvement" in the fuel situation nationally, but warns the situation is still critical in London and the South East.
- As the 2021 Conservative Party Conference gets under way, Prime Minister Boris Johnson pledges to "change and improve" the economy after COVID, saying things cannot "go back to the way they were". before the pandemic.
- Health Secretary Sajid Javid warns care home workers that if they are not willing to get the vaccine they should find another job.
- The Scottish Government says the "teething problems" with its vaccine passport app should be resolved within a couple of days.

==== 3 October ====
- Speaking on the BBC's The Andrew Marr Show, Prime Minister Boris Johnson says he is a "zealous opponent of unnecessary tax rises", but refuses to rule further tax rises out, warning that COVID has hit the UK's economy like a "fiscal meteorite".
- The Petrol Retailers Association says that the fuel crisis is over in most of the country, but that supplies are still not getting to London and the South East, where a fifth of forecourts have run dry.
- An estimated 80,000 people take part in the 2021 London Marathon, doing so either or in person or virtually using an app.
- Around 5,700 people take part in the 2021 Belfast Marathon, the first to take place in the city since 2019.
- Welsh Health Minister Eluned Morgan confirms that all children aged 12–15 will have been offered a COVID vaccine by the end of the October half term.

==== 4 October ====
- The changes to the travel list come into force, with the merger of the green and amber lists, as well as changes to rules regarding tests for fully vaccinated people.
- The Petrol Retailers Association says 20% of garage forecourts in London and the South East are now without fuel.
- Scotland's Deputy First Minister John Swinney says the country's vaccine passport app is up and running and functioning well.
- Shelter Cymru has accused police forces in Wales of "assisting illegal evictions" during the pandemic. Evictions were banned in Wales for much of the pandemic, and remained so until June 2021 when the ban was replaced with a six-month notice for tenants.

==== 5 October ====
- Department for Education figures indicate the number of pupils absent from school in England rose by two thirds in the two weeks to 30 September, with 204,000 (2.5% of school pupils) absent due to COVID-related reasons.
- In a speech to the Conservative Party Conference, Party Chairman Oliver Dowden says that "people need to get off their Pelotons and back to their desks".
- In Wales, Members of the Senedd vote 28–27 in favour of introducing COVID passports for nightclubs and large events on 11 October.
- Scottish First Minister Nicola Sturgeon apologises for the problems experienced during the launch of Scotland's vaccine passport app.
- A Public Health Scotland report into the February 2020 outbreak of COVID at a Nike conference in Edinburgh finds it did not lead to community transmission of the virus.
- Analysis from market researchers Defaqto indicates insurers are increasingly covering the cost of treatment for distressed pets whose owners are returning to work after the pandemic.

==== 6 October ====
- The Foreign and Commonwealth Office confirms that Britons will no longer be advised to avoid holidays to 32 destinations. The countries include Bangladesh, Fiji, Gambia and Malaysia.
- The temporary £20 increase in Universal Credit payments comes to an end, prompting Baroness Philippa Stroud, one of the politicians who designed the system, to call for a vote on the ending of it.
- Addressing the Conservative Party Conference, Prime Minister Boris Johnson sets out his plans for uniting and levelling up the country. He also tells delegates that former Prime Minister Margaret Thatcher would have warned against more borrowing to help public finances after COVID, because it would lead to higher interest rates and taxes.
- The gender pay gap has remained at 10.4% for the second year in a row, with COVID disproportionately affecting women's pay.

==== 7 October ====
- Transport Secretary Grant Shapps announces that England's travel red list will be cut from 54 countries to just seven from Monday 11 October, with South Africa, Brazil and Mexico included in the countries where quarantine upon return to the UK is no longer required. The countries remaining on the red list are Panama, Colombia, Venezuela, Peru, Ecuador, Haiti and the Dominican Republic. Shapps describes the changes as marking "the next step" in opening travel.
- The UK government launches a campaign urging people who are eligible for the flu vaccine to come forward, amid concerns about high rates of flu over the coming winter.
- The Northern Ireland Executive agrees to scrap the requirement for social distancing in bars and restaurants from 31 October, meaning nightclubs will be allowed to reopen from that date.
- BBC News reports that staff working at the Rothera Research Station in Antarctica have been vaccinated with the AstraZeneca vaccine.

==== 8 October ====
- The Foreign & Commonwealth Office lifts its advice to avoid holidays in 51 destinations, including the Bahamas, Jamaica and Cameroon.
- Former Tesco chairman Sir Dave Lewis is appointed as the UK government's adviser for supply chain management following the crises with fuel supply and the supply of other essentials.
- Figures released by the Office for National Statistics for the week ending 2 October show an increase in COVID infections in English secondary schools, with one in 14 believed to have the virus, up from one in 20 the week before. Nationally the rate has risen from one in 85 to one in 70, the rise having been driven by the secondary school increase.
- Setting out the Welsh Government's autumn and winter plan, First Minister Mark Drakeford says that people can look forward to a Christmas "much more like the ones we are used to" providing nothing unexpected happens.
- Health officials confirm that people who took part in trials of COVID vaccines that are yet to be approved, such as the Novavax vaccine, will be offered two doses of another vaccine beginning from the following week, and enabling them to travel.
- Hull Fair, one of Europe's largest travelling funfairs, reopens after being cancelled in 2020 due to COVID.

==== 9 October ====
- Singapore announces it will allow quarantine free travel from a number of countries, including the United Kingdom.
- England's chief nursing officer, Ruth May confirms that over two million booster vaccinations have been given out so far, describing it as "fantastic".
- Genesis confirm they have postponed the final four UK dates of their reunion tour "due to positive Covid-19 tests within the band".

==== 10 October ====
- Jenny Harries, chief executive of the Health Security Agency, tells the BBC the UK faces an uncertain winter with the spread of COVID and flu, with people at "more significant risk of death and of serious illness if they are co-infected" with both viruses.

==== 11 October ====
- The number of countries on the UK's travel red list is reduced to seven.
- NHS England urges pregnant women to get the vaccine following concerns about the growing number of expectant mothers requiring hospital treatment after contracting COVID.
- Michael Rosen, who spend two months in a medically induced coma after contracting COVID in 2020, wins the Centre for Literacy in Primary Education Poetry Award for On the Move, a collection of poems about migration.

==== 12 October ====
- Coronavirus: Lessons learned to date, a joint report published by the House of Commons Health and Social Care Committee and the Science and Technology Committee, as well as MPs from all parties, describes delays in the UK government's response during the early stages of the pandemic as one of the country's worst public health failures, and led to tens of thousands of people dying needlessly. The report is more favourable of the development and deployment of the vaccine programme, which it describes as "one of the most effective initiatives in UK history".
- London's New Year's Eve fireworks display alongside the Thames is cancelled for a second year running due to "uncertainties caused by Covid".
- Former Health Secretary Matt Hancock confirms he has been given a role by the United Nations as a special representative helping Africa's economic recovery from COVID. The job offer is withdrawn a few days later.

==== 13 October ====
- Figures from the Office for National Statistics show the UK economy grew by 0.4% in August 2021, largely as a result of people taking holidays, eating out and attending music concerts.
- The NHS COVID Pass, used to show a person's vaccination status, briefly stops working for three hours following a technical problem with the NHS app.
- The BBC reports that a shortage of care staff in England, who support patients discharged from hospital into the community, is leading to problems at hospitals.
- The journal Nature reports that many scientists whose public profile rose during the pandemic have received online abuse and threats of violence.

==== 15 October ====
- The White House confirms the United States will reopen its borders to fully vaccinated people from a number of countries, including the UK, from 8 November. Other countries include those in the Schengen Area, Ireland, Iran, South Africa, India and Brazil, and travellers will need to produce a negative COVID test 72 hours before travelling.
- An estimated 43,000 people in England and Wales have been incorrectly told their COVID PCR tests were negative following errors at a Wolverhampton laboratory run by a private company, Immensa. Testing at the lab is suspended, and Jenny Harries, chief executive of the UK Health Security Agency, orders an investigation into the length of time it took to identify the problem, around a month.

==== 16 October ====
- The UK records 43,423 new COVID cases, the fourth consecutive day that new cases have been above 40,000, while figures from the Office for National Statistics indicate around one in 60 people may have the virus.
- North Sea energy company Canadian Natural Resources becomes the first major UK employer to mandate its employees to have a COVID vaccination, requiring them to have the vaccine before travelling to its offshore facilities.

==== 17 October ====
- Former Prime Minister Gordon Brown urges the United Kingdom, United States, Canada and Europe to begin an emergency airlift of surplus vaccine supplies to countries who are short of vaccine doses.

==== 18 October ====
- Stage three tests of the Valneva COVID-19 vaccine find it to be very effective in priming the immune system against COVID-19.
- BBC News reports on concerns the booster vaccine rollout, described as "the last piece of the jigsaw", is not happening fast enough.
- Following reports Prime Minister Boris Johnson and his then fiancée Carrie Symonds broke lockdown rules on 25 December 2020 when they were joined at 10 Downing Street by a friend, Nimco Ali, a Downing Street spokesman rejects the claims and says they "followed coronavirus rules at all times". On Christmas Day 2020 residents in London were only permitted to spend time indoors with people in their support bubble.
- A report by the Salvation Army for Anti Slavery Day 2021 voices concerns that the effects of the pandemic could lead to a rise in people trafficking.
- Scotland's vaccine passport scheme becomes enforceable by law.

==== 19 October ====
- Officials are keeping an eye on AY.4.2, a descendant of the Delta variant of COVID that is reported to be responsible for 6% of new infections. The variant is also known as Delta Plus.
- A further 43,738 new COVID cases are recorded, along with 223 deaths, the highest daily number since March. With the number of new cases above 40,000 for the seventh consecutive day, Downing Street says it is "keeping a very close eye" on the situation, but that the Cabinet has not yet discussed enacting its Plan B for the winter.
- Police escort Cabinet Minister Michael Gove away from a group of anti-lockdown protestors in central London after they tried to surround him.

==== 20 October ====
- The NHS Confederation calls for the immediate reintroduction of some COVID measures in order to prevent England "stumbling into a winter crisis".
- At the first government briefing for some time, Health Secretary Sajid Javid warns that the reintroduction of some COVID measures through the UK government's Plan B, such as compulsory face coverings and advice to work from home if possible, is more likely if not enough people get vaccinated. He said the government will not be bringing in the measures "at this point" but warns daily cases could rise to 100,000 a day.
- Javid also sets out the government's Winter COVID Plan and announces that two antiviral treatments, Molnupiravir and PF-07321332/ritonavir, are in the testing phase and could be ready for deployment over the winter.
- Javid also says that MPs should set an example by wearing face coverings in the House of Commons.
- Research published by the University of Edinburgh indicates that COVID vaccination is 90% effective at preventing death from the disease.
- Morocco announces the suspension of flights to and from the UK, Germany and the Netherlands because of rising COVID cases; the suspension takes effect from 11.59pm on 20 October until further notice.
- A man is arrested at an anti-vaccine protest outside the Houses of Parliament after erecting a mock gallows.

==== 21 October ====
- The UK records 52,009 new COVID cases, the first time the daily number has been above 50,000 since 17 July. Prime Minister Boris Johnson urges people to come forward for their vaccinations when they are contacted to do so.
- Responding to comments by Shadow Leader of the House Thangam Debbonaire that MPs should wear masks in the House of Commons, Leader of the House Jacob Rees-Mogg says that Conservative MPs do not need to wear face coverings during debates because they are all friends, and the advice for mask wearing is in the company of people that are unknown to each other.
- After a survey concluded that four in ten adults gained weight during the pandemic, Conservative peer and former minister Andrew Robathan urges the government to "tell people they must not eat so much" in an effort to stop them getting "grossly overweight".
- Figures show that government borrowing in September 2021 was down in comparison to a year earlier, with borrowing at £21.8bn, £7bn less than September 2020.
- Statistics show the NHS in Wales has recorded its worst ever performance figures, with a tenfold increase in the number of people waiting more than nine months for treatment; around 25,000 people were waiting for treatment before the pandemic compared to the latest figures which show 250,000 are waiting.

==== 22 October ====
- The UK Health Security Agency upgrades the Delta Plus COVID variant to the "variant under investigation" category amid concerns it is easier to spread than the original Delta variant.
- Published minutes of a meeting of the Scientific Advisory Group for Emergencies from 14 October show they have advised the government that advice to work from home over the coming winter is the best way of helping to stem the spread of COVID.
- An Office for National Statistics survey indicates changes in mask wearing and social distancing habits. The percentage of adults who say they always or often maintain social distancing has fallen 63% in mid-July to 39% in mid-October, while 82% surveyed in mid-October say they wear a face covering, compared to 97% in mid-June.
- Dr Roland Salmon, former director of communicable diseases for Public Health Wales, says he believes lockdown restrictions are only "at best marginally" beneficial for stopping the spread of COVID, and should not return over the coming winter to protect NHS Wales. Instead he says that efforts should be focused on vaccinating those most at risk.
- Wales's Health Minister, Eluned Morgan, confirms fully vaccinated travellers returning to Wales from overseas will no longer need to take a PCR test from 31 October, bringing Wales in line with rule changes in England. Instead they will need a lateral flow test within two days of their return.

==== 23 October ====
- Chancellor Rishi Sunak is to announce £6.9bn of investment in public transport for the UK's regions in the forthcoming budget.
- Hope Rescue, an animal charity in South Wales, reports that people have attempted to sell dogs they bought during lockdown on Gumtree and even attempted to disguise them as strays so that animal charities will take them in.

==== 24 October ====
- New rules come into force allowing fully vaccinated travellers returning to England to take lateral flow tests instead of PCR tests.
- Shadow Chancellor Rachel Reeves urges the UK government to introduce its Plan B for tackling COVID, but Chancellor Rishi Sunak responds the data does not suggest "immediately moving to Plan B".
- Sunak describes his forthcoming budget will be about "strong investment in public services" in order to help rebuild the post-COVID economy.
- Singer Ed Sheeran confirms he has tested positive for COVID, but says he will continue to give planned interviews and performances from home while he is self-isolating.
- Scotland's Health Secretary, Humza Yousaf says there is "absolutely a risk" of COVID cases rising after the COP26 summit in Glasgow, which will be attended by 25,000 people.

==== 25 October ====
- The UK government confirms the NHS in England is to receive an extra £5.9bn in the forthcoming budget to help clear the record backlog built up during the COVID crisis. The money will also be used to buy extra equipment and improve IT.
- Labour Party leader Sir Keir Starmer calls for legislation to give local authorities the power to prevent anti-vaccine protesters from gathering outside schools by creating exclusion zones.
- Health Secretary Sajid Javid says he believes people will be able to celebrate Christmas 2021 as normal, and that he is minded to make vaccinations compulsory for NHS staff.
- Details of a study published in Nature Medicine suggest people are more likely to get Guillain-Barre Syndrome (GBS), a rare neurological condition, if they are infected with COVID rather than being vaccinated.

==== 26 October ====
- The UK government confirms plans to end the pay freeze on public sector wages.
- Modelling done for the government suggests that COVID cases are set to fall dramatically in the coming weeks.
- Face coverings are made mandatory for everyone working at Westminster apart from MPs.
- An event planned by the Channel Island Integrative Health Alliance (CIIHA) at the Guernsey's States-owned Performing Arts Centre is cancelled by the authorities sparking accusations of it being "an attack on freedom of speech".

==== 27 October ====
- Chancellor Rishi Sunak delivers the second budget of 2021 in which he says the economy is expected to return to pre-COVID levels by the end of the year.
- Labour Party leader Sir Keir Starmer is forced to self-isolate after testing positive for COVID, meaning he is unable to deliver the official opposition's response to the budget; this is done by Shadow Chancellor Rachel Reeves instead.
- Following political differences over the wearing of masks in the House of Commons, the majority of the Conservative front bench are seen wearing them during the budget.
- As it is estimated that as many as 100,000 climate protesters could be present at the forthcoming COP26 conference in Glasgow, Edinburgh University's Professor Linda Bauld cites them as the biggest cause for concern of there being a COVID outbreak because of the conference.
- Rail operator West Midlands Trains says restrictions on training opportunities during COVID have led to a shortage of drivers, and that consequently delays and cancellations to its services could continue for several months into 2022.
- Richard Hughes, chairman of the Office for Budget Responsibility, says that the long-term effects of Brexit may be worse than those of COVID.
- RAJAR published its first set of post-COVID radio audience figures, having had an 18-month hiatus. The figures show a fall in the number of breakfast show listeners to a number of stations when compared to pre-pandemic figures, although RAJAR says this could be as a result of a change in the way it records its figures.

==== 28 October ====
- It is confirmed the final seven countries on the UK's red list – Colombia, Peru, Panama, the Dominican Republic, Haiti, Venezuela and Ecuador – will be removed from the red lists of all four home nations from Monday 1 November, meaning people returning from those countries will no longer be required to pay for hotel quarantine. However, the provision for re-adding countries will be retained.
- A study published in The Lancet suggests double vaccinated people are catching COVID and passing it on to those they live with.

==== 29 October ====
- The Department of Health confirms that seven million people have received a booster vaccine since the programme was launched six weeks ago, with two million having the third vaccine in the past week.
- The clinical guidelines regarding the booster vaccine are to be changed for some people, such as care home workers, to allow them to have the booster five months after their second dose rather than six months. But most people will continue to have it six months after the second dose.
- As the autumn half-term nears an end, the UK Health Security Agency encourages schoolchildren in England and Wales to do a rapid flow COVID test before returning to school.
- Figures show that overseas residents made just under 300,000 visits by air to the UK between April and June 2021, a 97% decline on pre-pandemic levels.
- Welsh First Minister Mark Drakeford announces new measures to tackle COVID in Wales, which has the highest rates. The COVID pass scheme will be extended to cinemas, theatres and concert halls from 15 November, while anyone living with a person who tests positive for COVID will be required to self-isolate until they can obtain a negative PCR test. Drakeford says that further measures will be considered if cases remain high.
- The Lockdown Sessions, an album recorded by Sir Elton John during the pandemic, reaches number one in the UK Album Chart.

==== 30 October ====
- Figures produced by the Rail Delivery Group, the rail industry's body, indicate commuter journeys are at half their pre-pandemic levels.
- Wales hosts its first international rugby match with a full capacity crowd since the beginning of the pandemic. The game against New Zealand at Cardiff's Principality Stadium is attended by 74,000 spectators, the majority of who are required to present COVID passes before entering the stadium. Their tickets also include specified arrival times and entrances in order to stagger entries.

==== 31 October ====
- Health officials from NHS England are to visit around 800 schools in an attempt to accelerate the vaccination programme for 12–15-year-olds; around 600,000 people in that age group have already had the vaccine.
- Nightclubs in Northern Ireland are reopened as some remaining COVID restrictions are lifted; Northern Ireland is the last part of the UK to reopen its night time venues.

=== November 2021 ===
==== 1 November ====
- Vaccine booster doses without a prior appointment become available at walk-in centres in England for around 30 million people who had their second vaccine more than six months ago.
- Ryanair announces plans to cut fares over the coming winter to boost sales.
- The refurbished Island Line on the Isle of Wight is reopened ten months after work began, having been delayed by COVID and other issues.
- Northern Ireland's Department of Health launches the Cert Check NI app to facilitate the "voluntary use" of vaccine checks in the entertainment and hospitality sector.

==== 2 November ====
- Health Secretary Sajid Javid warns the public not to "let down their guard" on COVID.
- Sir Jeremy Farrar steps down from the Scientific Advisory Group for Emergencies (SAGE) to concentrate on his role as chair of the Wellcome Trust.
- MPs and peers are told by parliamentary authorities to wear face masks amid a high number of COVID cases at Westminster.
- Scottish Health Secretary Humza Yousaf confirms 120 military personnel are to be drafted in to help with COVID vaccine and flu vaccine deployment in Scotland.

==== 3 November ====
- England's deputy chief medical officer Jonathan Van-Tam voices his belief that "very high" COVID rates will mean there are difficult months ahead.
- A special Crown Office department established to investigate COVID-related deaths in hospitals in Scotland is investigating 827 cases, it is reported.

==== 4 November ====
- Molnupiravir, the first tablet designed to treat COVID-19, is given approval for use in the UK.
- The Bank of England announces no change in the interest rate, but signals there may be a raise in the coming months in order to offset an expected rise in inflation.

==== 5 November ====
- England's R number is estimated to be between 0.9 and 1.1, a fall from the same day the previous week when it was estimated to be between 1.1 and 1.3.
- A Cardiff University study suggests wearing face coverings could be affecting the way people interact with each other as they are not able to properly see facial expressions.
- Details of another study conducted by Cardiff University in 2020 indicate that primary school age children reported a substantial increase in ‘emotional difficulties’ compared with an identical survey conducted in 2018.
- The Licensed Private Car Hire Association (LPCHA) warns that more than half of licensed taxi drivers have left the industry since March 2020, and expresses fears a shortage of drivers could lead to safety issues for women and workers trying to get home late at night. It is estimated the number of licensed drivers has declined from around 300,000 to 160,000.

==== 6 November ====
- The UK government announces minor changes to the booster vaccine booking process from 8 November, allowing people to book them a month in advance.
- Figures have revealed that GP assessments for dementia patients have fallen by a third since the beginning of the pandemic.

==== 7 November ====
- The number of people receiving a third vaccine dose exceeds 10 million.
- Health Secretary Sajid Javid urges people to get their COVID booster as part of what he describes as a "national mission" to prevent restrictions at Christmas.
- Northern Ireland Health Minister Robin Swann initiates legal proceedings against Sir Van Morrison over the latter's description of him as "very dangerous" for his handling of the COVID pandemic.

==== 8 November ====
- The United States reopens its borders to travellers from the UK, Brazil, China, India, Ireland, South Africa, Iran and the countries in the Schengen area.
- During a series of interviews for news media, Amanda Pritchard, chief executive of NHS England, incorrectly states that COVID hospitalisations are "14 times" higher compared to "this time last year", when figures show cases have fallen in comparison to November 2020. The comments are subsequently reported by a number of media outlets, including Sky News and ITV News before the NHS attempts to clarify the statement by saying that Pritchard was referring to the figures for September 2021, which are higher than September 2020.
- Figures show 4.5 million people in England are yet to have a first vaccine, and NHS bosses are encouraging them to come forward.
- A survey by insurers Aviva suggests one in ten people regret purchases made during lockdown, such as DIY tools, pizza ovens and hot tubs, with an average £1,400 spent on items that are now unused.

==== 9 November ====
- Health Secretary Sajid Javid confirms it will be mandatory for frontline NHS staff in England to have both vaccines, with a deadline of April 2022 set as the date by which they must have the vaccine.
- Northern Ireland's Health Minister, Robin Swann, announces plans for a public consultation over whether to introduce mandatory COVID vaccines for healthcare workers in Northern Ireland.
- The Senedd votes 39–15 to extend Wales's COVID pass scheme from Monday 15 November to include cinemas, theatres and concert halls.
- A YouGov survey of 1,000 adults in Northern Ireland found that only 3% wanted to return fulltime to the office following the pandemic.

==== 10 November ====
- On the eve of new rules coming into force in England that require care home staff to be double vaccinated, some bosses fear losing as much as 8% of their workforce.
- French vaccine manufacturer Valneva is seeking an apology from the UK government after doubt was cast over whether its vaccine would be approved.

==== 11 November ====
- The College of Paramedics warns that people's lives are being put at risk by unacceptably lengthy waits for an emergency response when calling 999.
- The first documented case of a dog testing positive for COVID is reported. The UK Health Security Agency believes the dog caught the virus from its owner, but stresses that such instances are rare.
- The UK government confirms school pupils in England will be given advance notice of some content for 2022 exams due to disruption caused by COVID.
- Labour MP Chris Evans has stressed the need for a Wales-specific COVID inquiry, describing the need as a "moral" one, because bereaved families in Wales have particular questions that need answering.

==== 12 November ====
- Prime Minister Boris Johnson warns of "the storm clouds gathering over parts of the European continent" are a reminder that people should have their booster vaccine if invited. COVID cases in Europe have seen an increase while the UK appears to be bucking that trend.
- AstraZeneca confirms it will begin to draw an income from its vaccine after signing a series of for-profit deals. The company had previously stated it would only begin to make a profit from the vaccine once COVID was no longer a pandemic.
- The Ministry of Defence approves the extension of military help for NHS Lanarkshire and NHS Borders until December. The help from the MoD had been scheduled to expire on 10 November.
- According to i, unnamed sources told them that the UK government has produced three scenarios showing how the final stage of the COVID-19 pandemic could be played out. An optimistic scenario would see the pandemic being declared over between 2021 and 2023, a central scenario (considered the most likely) would see it end between 2023 and 2024, while a pessimistic scenario (considered the least likely) would see the pandemic continuing until 2026, with more restrictions and a waning of vaccine effectiveness.

==== 13 November ====
- Epidemiologist Professor Neil Ferguson suggests that extending the COVID booster vaccine programme to people aged under 50 would help to reduce transmission rates of the virus.
- Former Health Secretary Matt Hancock has reportedly been approached about writing a book about his experiences during the pandemic, but is undecided about doing so.

==== 14 November ====
- Health Secretary Sajid Javid confirms that over a million vaccines have been given to children aged 12–15.

==== 15 November ====
- The Joint Committee on Vaccination and Immunisation extends the booster vaccine programme to all adults over the age of 40, while also offering 16- and 17-year-olds a second dose; previously they had been offered only one.
- A study commissioned by youth charity Ditch the Labels notes that online hate speech in the UK and US increased by 20% during the pandemic.
- COVID pass requirements in Wales are extended to cinemas, theatres and concert venues.

==== 16 November ====
- Figures produced by the Office for National Statistics indicate there were 1.17 million job vacancies during October.
- Figures produced by NHS Digital indicate childhood obesity increased during 2020–21, with 14% of children classed as obese, up from 10% the previous year. Poverty, lockdowns and mental health problems are cited as contributing factors in the rise.

==== 17 November ====
- The vaccination advice for children aged 12–17 is updated, with the new recommendation that they should wait twelve weeks to get vaccinated following a COVID infection; previously the advice had been to wait four weeks.
- Northern Ireland's ministers vote to introduce mandatory COVID passports for Northern Ireland from December, which will need to be produced for entry into pubs, restaurants and nightclubs.

==== 18 November ====
- The latest figures show that almost 13 million people have had a booster vaccine, roughly 24% of the population.
- The UK government publishes a list of 50 companies that were given fast-track VIP contracts to supply personal protective equipment (PPE) following the COVID outbreak.
- Data produced by Imperial College London indicates that a single dose of COVID vaccine is 56% effective at preventing children from catching the virus.
- UK Health Security Agency data for the period up to 14 November indicates COVID cases in England are now highest among children aged 5–9.

==== 19 November ====
- Travellers from England become eligible to add their booster vaccine status to the NHS COVID Pass, enabling them to avoid having to quarantine in countries such as Austria, Croatia and Israel where vaccination status is time sensitive.
- A report produced by the National Audit Office concludes the UK government was not prepared for the pandemic and had made insufficient planning. Plans were in place for a serious flu outbreak or an outbreak of Ebola, but these were prioritised over infectious diseases with similar characteristics to COVID, the report says.

==== 20 November ====
- A University of Nottingham study will look at how to boost COVID vaccination protection in people with suppressed immune systems due to drugs; around 1.3 million people in the UK are in this situation.

==== 21 November ====
- Health Secretary Sajid Javid orders a review into whether medical devices are equally effective regardless of race after research suggests oximeters, which are clipped to a person's finger to measure levels of oxygen in the blood, can produce overstated readings in people from ethnic minorities.

==== 22 November ====
- People aged over 40 in England become eligible to book their COVID booster vaccination.
- Holidaymakers are urged to use £132m in credit notes issued by travel companies during the pandemic before they lose financial protection.
- A bronze sculpture dedicated to COVID heroes and victims is unveiled in Barnsley, South Yorkshire.
- The charity Help Musicians estimates that one third of musicians were earning nothing during the summer, even after the lifting of COVID restrictions allowed the return of live performances.

==== 23 November ====
- COVID advice is updated for England, where people are urged to take a lateral flow test if they expect to be in a “high risk situation” that day, such as spending time in “crowded and enclosed spaces” and where “there is limited fresh air”.
- The Northern Ireland Executive announces it is "strengthening" its advice to people in Northern Ireland to work from home whenever possible as a way of tackling rising COVID infections. People are also advised to limit their social contact and to wear face coverings if meeting up indoors.
- Scottish First Minister Nicola Sturgeon announces that Scotland's vaccine passport scheme will not be extended to cover cinemas, theatres and other hospitality venues following a slight fall in the number of cases, while from 6 December people will no longer need to provide proof of vaccination to enter venues already covered by the scheme, and provide a negative lateral flow test instead.
- Pascal Soriot, the chief executive of AstraZeneca tells BBC Radio 4's Today programme that the Oxford–AstraZeneca vaccine may be helping to keep hospital numbers lower in the UK.

==== 24 November ====
- The Commercial Rent (Coronavirus) Bill, which aims to create a legal process to settle disputes between commercial tenants and their landlords for rent arrears accrued during the pandemic, gets its second reading in the House of Commons.
- In a letter to Transport Secretary Grant Shapps, the Wine and Spirit Trade Association (WSTA) warns of a shortage of wines and spirits at Christmas because of rising costs and supply chain issues.
- Research carried out by the Audience Agency indicates theatre ticket sales in October were down a third on pre-pandemic levels, sparking concerns the ongoing impact of COVID on theatres.
- A man who sent a suspicious package to a Wrexham factory manufacturing the AstraZeneca vaccine in January is sent to prison for 27 months.
- A BBC News article cites COVID and Brexit as contributing factors to smaller Christmas markets in town squares this year, with 10,000 stallholders having left the industry during the pandemic.

==== 25 November ====
- The number of recorded COVID cases in the UK surpasses 10 million, as a further 47,240 cases taking overall the total to 10,021,497.
- Health Secretary Sajid Javid confirms that six countries from southern Africa − South Africa, Namibia, Zimbabwe, Botswana, Lesotho and Eswatini − will be added to the UK's travel red list from midday the following day amid concerns of a new COVID variant that may be more transmissible than previous variants and have the ability to evade the protection offered by vaccination; flights from the countries are also suspended. No cases of the variant have been discovered in the UK, while 59 have been discovered in South Africa, Hong Kong and Botswana.
- Data from England analysed by the UK Health Security Agency indicates COVID vaccinations are safe for pregnant women, reinforcing international data.
- Figures produced by the Office for National Statistics indicate a 27% rise in people dying in England while in treatment for drug and alcohol addiction during the pandemic.
- Relatives of a woman in her 50s left with brain damage and paralysis after contracting COVID are told they can appeal against a ruling that she should be allowed to die.

==== 26 November ====
- Naledi Pandor, South Africa's Foreign Minister, criticises the UK's decision to impose a temporary halt on flights from southern Africa as a "rushed decision" made before the World Health Organization (WHO) had made any announcement on the variant, while the country's Health Minister Joe Phaahla describes the measures as "unjustified". The WHO subsequently declared the new variant to be "of concern", and gives it the name Omicron.
- As it is confirmed that people returning from southern Africa will be required to quarantine in England for 10 days from Sunday 28 November, Health Secretary Sajid Javid tells the House of Commons that no cases of the new Omicron variant have been found in the UK, but that it is likely to spread. England's Chief Medical Officer, Professor Chris Whitty voices his concern that people may not accept further curbs on their activities.
- The FTSE 100 index closes down 3.7% amid concerns for economic recovery following the discovery of the Omicron variant.

==== 27 November ====
- Health Secretary Sajid Javid confirms two cases of the Omicron COVID variant have been found in the UK.
- Microbiologist and SAGE adviser Professor Calum Semple says the Omicron COVID variant is "not a disaster" and some people may be "hugely overstating the situation".
- At a Downing Street press conference, Prime Minister Boris Johnson announces the reintroduction of some measures for England as a result of the discovery of the Omicron variant. These include the requirement for anyone arriving into the UK to take a PCR test and isolate until they receive a negative result, the mandatory wearing of face coverings in shops and on public transport, and the requirement for all contacts of suspected Omicron cases to self-isolate for ten days. However, the government is not moving to its full Plan B of measures and people are not being asked to work from home. Johnson describes the measures, which will be reviewed in three weeks, as "temporary and precautionary", and also says he is "confident" Christmas 2021 will be better than Christmas 2020.
- It is also announced via Twitter that Malawi, Mozambique, Zambia and Angola are to be added to the UK's Red List as of Sunday 28 November at 4:00 a.m.
- Switzerland adds the UK to its "at risk" list along with other countries with cases.

==== 28 November ====
- After a doctor treating the new Omicron COVID variant says its symptoms are mild and there has been unnecessary panic about it, Health Secretary Sajid Javid describes the government's response as being "in a proportionate way".
- Professor Anthony Harnden, deputy chairman of the Joint Committee on Vaccination and Immunisation tells BBC Radio 4's Broadcasting House that adults aged 18 and over "will have an offer of a booster earlier than we had previously envisaged".
- The British Retail Consortium asks people to "respect" the rules regarding mandatory face coverings, but says it will be up to the police to enforce them.
- A third case of Omicron variant COVID has been detected in the UK, but the individual concerned, having travelled from southern Africa, is no longer in the UK.

==== 29 November ====
- The reintroduction of some COVID measures for England is formally announced to Parliament.
- The Joint Committee on Vaccination and Immunisation recommends all adults over the age of 18 should receive a booster vaccine. Furthermore, children aged 12–15 will be offered a second vaccine, and the gap between second vaccines and a booster will be shortened from six to three months.
- Secondary school pupils in England are "strongly advised" to wear face coverings in communal areas.
- On the eve of the reintroduction of compulsory face masks for shops and public transport, shopkeepers fear the impact the rules could have on business, particularly as violence and verbal abuse against retail and hospitality staff is at an all-time high.
- Welsh First Minister Mark Drakeford announces changes to COVID rules for secondary schools, requiring pupils to wear face coverings in classrooms. The changes go further than England, where they are only required in communal areas.

==== 30 November ====
- Rules regarding face coverings in England and PCR tests for travellers arriving into the UK come into force.
- The UK government announces that all adults in England over the age of 18 will receive a booster vaccine by the end of January 2022.
- Scottish First Minister Nicola Sturgeon confirms that all nine cases of the Omicron COVID variant found in Scotland are linked to a single event on 20 November. All nine people tested positive on 23 November and have been self-isolating since then.
- The Royal College of Veterinary Surgeons holds an urgent meeting in which it highlights the problem of an increasing number of animals needing treatment coupled with a decline in the number of veterinary surgeons.
- At a court hearing in Swansea, Anna Redfern, owner of Cinema & Co is ordered to close the business by a district judge for refusing to implement COVID passport checks. She is also fined £5,265 in costs.
- Prime Minister Boris Johnson tells Welsh First Minister Mark Drakeford that whoever leads a UK-wide COVID inquiry will want the investigation to be "visible and properly accessible to the people of Wales".
- Jenny Harries of the UK Health Security Agency, advised all people in the UK to reduce social contact while fears increase that current vaccines will work less well against Omicron than against other variants. Harris recognises that people socialise more over Christmas but advises cutting down on unnecessary socialising. She also wants people to get vaccinated as booster vaccination provides some degree of protection.

=== December 2021 ===
==== 1 December ====
- The UK government signs a contract for the supply of a further 114 million doses of COVID vaccine for 2022 and 2023.
- The number of cases of Omicron variant COVID in the UK rises to 32.
- Health Secretary Sajid Javid says the possible impact of Omicron variant COVID could be known in a fortnight.
- Javid says there is no need for people to call off their Christmas party plans, in spite of the emergence of the Omicron COVID variant.
- Following a report in the Daily Mirror that COVID rules were broken in 10 Downing Street in December 2020 when a number of Christmas parties were held in the premises, Prime Minister Boris Johnson tells Prime Minister's Questions that no rules were broken.
- The Scientific Advisory Group for Emergencies suggests that pre-travel COVID tests for anyone returning to the UK would be "useful".
- The Co-op joins Tesco, Aldi, Lidl and Iceland in deciding not to challenge customers over the wearing of face coverings, citing abuse of their staff as a reason.
- The Scottish Government apologises after some people over the age of 40 reported being turned away for their booster vaccines, and says updated guidelines have been issued to all of Scotland's health boards.

==== 2 December ====
- The Covid-19 Bereaved Families for Justice group says it is "sickened" by news of a party held at 10 Downing Street on 18 December 2020 during the height of COVID restrictions when such gatherings were banned. Prime Minister Boris Johnson says no restrictions were broken at the party.
- Technical problems that led to some people being turned away for the COVID booster vaccinations in Scotland have been resolved, First Minister Nicola Sturgeon confirms.
- Sotrovimab is approved in the UK as a COVID antibody treatment; tests have found it to be effective against COVID, and scientists believe it may be effective against new variants such as the Omicron variant.

==== 3 December ====
- The number of confirmed cases of Omicron in the UK exceeds 100. The Health Security Agency publishes a risk assessment of the new variant.
- A UK study trialling different COVID vaccines suggests the Pfizer and Moderna vaccines provide the best overall immunity response when used as booster doses.
- Conservative Party chairman Oliver Dowden says he has no plans to cancel Conservative Party Christmas parties after Labour said its parliamentary Christmas party would not be going ahead. Dowden says he would "urge people to keep calm and carry on with their plans".
- The first case of Omicron variant COVID is identified in Wales.

==== 4 December ====
- Health Secretary Sajid Javid confirms that travellers to the UK will need to take a pre-departure COVID test from 4:00am on 7 December.
- GP surgeries in England will be allowed to defer non-urgent health checks for over-75s in order to focus on providing the booster vaccine. The move is welcomed by doctors' leaders.
- Following calls from two Labour MPs for a police investigation into the Christmas party held in Downing Street on 18 December 2020, the Metropolitan Police says it does not routinely probe "retrospective breaches" of COVID laws, but will do so on this occasion.

==== 5 December ====
- A further 86 Omicron cases are found in the UK, bringing the total to 246.
- SAGE member Professor Mark Woolhouse describes the new travel regulations as "a case of shutting the stable door after the horse has bolted".

==== 6 December ====
- Health Secretary Sajid Javid confirms there is community transmission of Omicron variant COVID in several communities within England, with a total of 336 UK cases confirmed so far.
- A trade body describes the UK government's website for finding COVID tests as "not serving its purpose" amid warnings about misleading prices.

==== 7 December ====
- New travel rules requiring people to take a pre-departure COVID test before travelling into the UK come into force.
- The official spokesman for Prime Minister Boris Johnson says early evidence suggests the Omicron variant of COVID is more transmissible than the Delta variant, but that any impact caused by it will determine on whether it causes severe illness; currently there are 437 cases of the new variant in the UK.
- A video obtained by ITV News shows senior Downing Street staff joking about a party days after one was held while the UK was under COVID restrictions in December 2020, and as the government continues to claim no party occurred. Keir Starmer says "They knew there was a party, they knew it was against the rules, they knew they couldn't admit it, and they thought it was funny". Starmer maintains the government have lost the moral authority to lead.
- Scottish First Minister Nicola Sturgeon announces plans to review COVID rules on a daily basis amid concerns about the rise in numbers of cases of the Omicron variant; a total of 99 have now been identified in Scotland.
- The first case of the Omicron variant is identified in Northern Ireland, and is believed to be linked to travel from the UK mainland.

==== 8 December ====
- The booster jab program opens to over-40s, meaning an extra seven million people can get a third vaccine dose.
- A leaked copy of the minutes of a SAGE meeting contains speculation that the Omicron variant could lead to 1,000 hospitalisations per day by the end of the month.
- Allegra Stratton resigns as the Downing Street press secretary after video footage of staff joking about a Christmas party emerged.
- The Metropolitan Police confirms it will not investigate the Downing Street Christmas Party.
- At a Downing Street press conference, Prime Minister Boris Johnson announces new Plan B rules for England that will see masks become compulsory in indoor public places from Friday 10 December, and a requirement for COVID passports in order to enter nightclubs and other large venues from Wednesday 15 December. People will also be advised to work from home if they can from Monday 13 December.
- At the same press conference Johnson says that although there are no plans for mandatory vaccinations in the UK, there needs to be a "national conversation" about protecting the public.
- The NHS COVID Pass crashes within hours of the above announcement.

==== 9 December ====
- The Conservative Party confirms that a party, separate to the one at Downing Street, was held at its headquarters by Shaun Bailey's mayoral campaign in December 2020. The Telegraph reports the party "featured dancing and wine-drinking into the early hours despite indoor social mixing being banned at the time".
- Paymaster General Michael Ellis confirms a Cabinet Office investigation into the Downing Street party held on 18 December 2020 will look at two other events held while England was under COVID restrictions; a leaving party for a Downing Street employee on 27 November 2020, which was allegedly attended by the Prime Minister, and a Christmas party at the Department for Education on 10 December.
- Fresh developments emerge over the Downing Street Christmas party controversy, with allegations Jack Doyle, who at the time was Deputy Director of Communications, gave a speech and handed out awards to 50 attendees.
- The UK Health Security Agency says that Omicron cases are doubling every 2.5 to 3 days, and predicts that recorded cases are underestimated. The Agency forecasts there could be over a million cases by the end of December 2021.

==== 10 December ====
- The UK records 58,194 daily COVID cases, its highest number since January 2021.
- The UK Health Security Agency forecasts that the Omicron variant could be the dominant strain of COVID by the end of December, with a million cases; 581 have been confirmed to date. Early analysis also suggests two vaccines are less effective against the Omicron variant than the Delta variant, but that a third vaccine provides 70–75% protection against developing COVID symptoms.
- New guidelines for care homes in England restrict residents to three visitors and one essential care provider.
- Former Downing Street chief adviser Dominic Cummings tells Sky News there are pictures of the 2020 Downing Street Christmas party that will "inevitably get out", and that there were "invites sent across Whitehall".
- BBC News reports that Downing Street denies claims that Jack Doyle offered his resignation as Downing Street Director of Communications in the wake of revelations he gave a speech at the 18 December gathering and that it was rejected.
- UK residents who received their vaccine overseas or in Northern Ireland are now eligible to use England's NHS COVID Pass.

==== 11 December ====
- A study published by the London School of Hygiene and Tropical Medicine suggests a substantial increase in the number of Omicron variant cases in January 2022 without further restrictions, with a prediction of double the number of hospitalisations compared to winter 2020–21 and anything from 25,000 to 75,000 deaths by April 2022. But the scientists behind the study say its modelling is uncertain, while its worst-case scenario is dismissed by infectious diseases expert Professor Paul Hunter as unlikely.
- A further 633 Omicron cases are identified in the UK in the largest daily increase so far.
- Fresh allegations emerge of another civil service gathering while England was in lockdown in late 2020, with reports that two dozen HM Treasury staff gathered for drinks on 25 November to celebrate Chancellor Rishi Sunak's Autumn Spending Review.

==== 12 December ====
- Downing Street confirms that Prime Minister Boris Johnson took part in an online virtual Christmas quiz on 15 December 2020 after the Sunday Mirror publishes a picture of him on a screen during the event.
- The Independent reports that senior police officers fear people will be less likely to comply with any new COVID restrictions because of the scandal surrounding parties held by Downing Street and UK government departments. The newspaper says they have gathered anecdotal evidence of terse exchanges between police officers and members of the public in the days following the onset of the scandal.
- The UK COVID alert level is raised from three to four by the four chief medical officers due to the spread of the Omicron variant.
- Johnson brings forward the booster programme for all eligible people from the end of January to the end of December, declaring "there is a tidal wave of Omicron coming"; the booster programme will be extended to all over 18s from the following day.
- People in England who have received both vaccines will be told to take daily lateral flow tests if they have been in close contact with someone who tested positive for COVID from Tuesday 14 December.

==== 13 December ====
- The first UK death linked to the Omicron variant is reported.
- Health Secretary Sajid Javid says the Omicron variant now makes up 20% of the new COVID cases in England, and is expected to become the dominant variant in London in 48 hours.
- The UK government announces that members of the armed forces will be drafted in to help with the booster programme.
- The NHS website crashes as thousands of people in England attempt to book their booster vaccines.
- BBC News reports that around 70 Conservative MPs are expected to vote against tighter COVID restrictions when they are brought before parliament later in the week.
- Speaking about the Westminster Christmas parties controversy, Prime Minister Boris Johnson says he "certainly broke no rules".
- COVID Passes become enforceable for hospitality businesses in Northern Ireland, with a £10,000 fine for any venue that does not comply.

==== 14 December ====
- MPs vote 369–126 in favour of introducing COVID passes for nightclubs and large venues in England, with 100 Conservative MPs voting against the measure, the largest Conservative rebellion since Boris Johnson became prime minister. MPs also vote in favour of the use of compulsory face masks in most indoor settings, replacing mandatory self-isolation with daily lateral flow tests for any fully vaccinated people who come into contact with someone testing positive for COVID, and compulsory vaccines for NHS and other healthcare workers from April 2022. The measures become law from the following day.
- The UK removes all 11 African countries from the travel red list, allowing easier travel between them and England. Anyone quarantining in a hotel will also be allowed to leave early.
- The UK records 59,610 new COVID cases, the largest number since January, and there is a warning from Professor Chris Whitty, England's Chief Medical Officer, that hospitalisations will face a significant increase in the number of admissions.
- Scotland's First Minister, Nicola Sturgeon, urges people to limit their gatherings to three households in the run up to Christmas.
- Dr Angelique Coetzee, the South African physician who first raised the alarm about the Omicron variant, and who has been asked to look at the UK government's response to it by the House of Commons Science and Technology Select Committee, suggests Prime Minister Johnson has over reacted to the situation and is creating "hysteria". Coetzee tells Sky News there is a "huge gap" between "the science and what is actually happening".

==== 15 December ====
- The UK records its highest number of daily cases since the pandemic began, at 78,610.
- England's Chief Medical Officer, Professor Chris Whitty warns that COVID records "will be broken a lot" in the coming weeks as cases increase.
- A leaked photo emerges of former London mayoral candidate Shaun Bailey and 23 colleagues holding a Christmas party at the Conservative headquarters in London, during the COVID-19 restrictions of December 2020.
- Business groups have urged the government to provide assistance to companies impacted by a rise in COVID cases.
- Hotel quarantine guests in England are told they can leave as long as they have a negative COVID test, and they will be refunded.
- More than 30 local authorities have told the BBC their schools are prepared to switch to online learning again after Christmas should that be required, with children being given laptops to take home over the holidays.
- The Scottish hospitality sector estimates it has taken a "£1bn hit" because of cancelled events in the run up to Christmas.

==== 16 December ====
- A further 88,376 new COVID cases are reported, while 745,183 booster vaccines are given.
- First Minister of Wales Mark Drakeford announces the closure of nightclubs in Wales from 27 December as a result of the spread of the Omicron variant.
- The Daily Mirror reports another Westminster staff Christmas party held during December 2020's lockdown, this time at the Department for Transport on 16 December. The Department for Transport apologises for holding the party.
- Chancellor Rishi Sunak announces plans to cut short a trip to the United States in order to have discussions with business leaders about the problems facing businesses because of COVID. The chancellor had been accused of being "missing in action" over the trip.
- The Scottish Government issues new guidelines for hospitality and retail businesses in Scotland advising the return of social distancing and one-way systems for shops and supermarkets; the guidelines are effective from 12.01am the following day.

==== 17 December ====
- A further 93,045 COVID cases are reported, the third day on which the highest number of the pandemic so far has been reported.
- A total of 861,306 were given on the previous day, figures show.
- Research from Imperial College London indicates a booster vaccine is 85% effective against the Omicron variant. Figures show more than 50% of eligible adults have received a booster.
- Minutes of a meeting held by the Scientific Advisory Group for Emergencies (SAGE) the previous day contain the prediction that there will be 3,000 hospitalisations a day without further restrictions in England.
- A YouGov survey carried out for The Times indicates a majority of people have no plans to change their plans in the run up to Christmas despite the spread of the Omicron variant. The survey finds 10 per cent of those questioned had changed plans to go to a pub or restaurant, while 16 per cent said they had avoided a Christmas party, and 90 per cent said they were going to work as normal.
- The Premier League and UK government urge footballers to get the vaccine after half the upcoming weekend's fixtures are postponed due to COVID outbreaks at clubs.
- Simon Case recuses himself from his role of leading an inquiry into alleged government staff parties during lockdown, after it is reported that a similar event was also held in his own office.
- The Omicron variant is believed to have replaced the Delta variant as the most dominant variant in Scotland.
- France imposes a ban on travellers from the UK from 11pm GMT, apart from in exceptional circumstances.

==== 18 December ====
- A further 90,418 COVID cases are confirmed, with 10,000 of them being Omicron variant cases.
- The increase in Omicron cases prompts Mayor of London Sadiq Khan to declare an emergency.
- The Scientific Advisory Group for Emergencies (SAGE) says that more stringent measures need to be brought in for England to prevent hospitalisations reaching 3,000 per day. Their recommendation follows reports in The Times that the UK government is planning a two-week "firebreaker" lockdown after Christmas that would see mixing indoors banned and pubs and restaurants restricted to outdoor service.
- Lord David Frost resigns from the Johnson ministry, citing the government's direction, as well as its continued use of COVID measures. In a letter to the Prime Minister, Frost says measures to reopen the economy in July "did not prove to be irreversible...I hope we can get back on track soon and not be tempted by the kind of coercive measures we have seen elsewhere".
- Germany announces it is imposing tighter restrictions on travellers from the UK from 11pm GMT the following day.

==== 19 December ====
- A further 82,886 COVID cases are recorded, 12,133 of which are identified as Omicron variant cases.
- Speaking to the BBC's The Andrew Marr Show, Health Secretary Sajid Javid refuses to rule out further restrictions to tackle the Omicron variant.
- The Guardian publishes a photograph showing Prime Minister Boris Johnson, his then partner Carrie Symonds and 17 members of staff attending a gathering at which cheese and wine were present in the garden of 10 Downing Street in May 2020, at a time when the number of people who were allowed to meet up outside was limited. Downing Street has previously described the gathering as a "work meeting".
- Piers Corbyn is arrested by the Met Police after a video emerges of him urging people to "hammer to death those scum, those scum who have decided to go ahead with introducing new fascism", as well as suggesting that the offices of MPs who had voted for COVID-19 restrictions should be burned down.

==== 20 December ====
- Following a cabinet meeting, Prime Minister Boris Johnson rules out any immediate new restrictions, but says the government "won't hesitate" to introduce further restrictions for England, adding that the data is being reviewed "hour by hour" and there are "some things that we need to be clearer about before we decide to go further". However, media reports circulate of plans for a four-week ban on indoor socialising from 27 December.
- For the second year in a row The Queen cancels the traditional royal family Christmas at Sandringham in favour of festive celebrations at Windsor Castle.
- New Year's Eve celebrations in Trafalgar Square are cancelled by London Mayor Sadiq Khan.
- BBC News reports on how fraudsters are offering unvaccinated people fake COVID passes.
- The English Premier League confirms that its programme of fixtures for the Christmas period will go ahead as planned.
- ITV confirms that its breakfast television programme Good Morning Britain will go into hiatus over the Christmas period as a result of rapid increase in COVID-19 cases. A special edition of the programme is planned for Christmas Day, but editions scheduled for 29, 30 and 31 December will not go ahead.
- The Department for Education asked for recently retired teachers and for trained teachers who had moved to other professions to return to teaching from January in anticipation of staff sickness due to Omicron variant cases.

==== 21 December ====
- Prime Minister Boris Johnson confirms there will be no new COVID restrictions for England before Christmas, but does not rule them out for afterwards.
- Chancellor Rishi Sunak announces £1bn of funding to help leisure and hospitality sector businesses affected by COVID.
- New measures are announced for Scotland effective from Boxing Day (26 December) that limit the number of spectators at outdoor sporting events to 500, and indoor events such as concerts to 200 if seated and 100 if standing. Pubs and restaurants must also offer table service only. Edinburgh's Hogmanay Street Party is also cancelled.
- The Welsh Government announces the levy of fines on employees and employers if people are not working from home without a good reason, effective from Monday 27 December. Workers will receive a £60 fixed penalty fine while employers will receive a £1,000 fine for each breach of the rules.
- Train operators have reported the cancellation of hundreds of services in the run up to Christmas as staff become ill with COVID and are required to self-isolate.

==== 22 December ====
- The self-isolation requirement for contacts of anyone testing positive for COVID in England is shortened from ten to seven days.
- A further 106,122 new COVID-19 cases are confirmed, the largest daily number so far.
- A study of Omicron variant cases in Scotland and published in the UK and South Africa indicates the variant could be milder than previous COVID variants, with a reduction in hospitalisations of anything from 30% to 70%, but there is still concern that cases could still overwhelm hospitals.
- Government scientists have recommended that some primary school age children classed as clinically vulnerable32 should be offered a low-dose COVID vaccine. There is also a recommendation that some older children could receive a boost doe in response to the Omicron variant. A decision by health officials is yet to be made.
- The Welsh Government announces the reintroduction of the rule of six and outdoor social distancing from Boxing Day, with groups of six allowed to meet in pubs and restaurants, while hospitality will once again be limited to table service. Outdoor events will be limited to 50 people, while indoor events will be limited to 30, although life events such as weddings and funerals will be unaffected.
- Restrictions are also announced for Northern Ireland from Boxing Day, with nightclubs required to close and indoor standing events prohibited. Dancing at venues will also be prohibited, but this rule will not apply at weddings.

==== 23 December ====
- The UK records a further 119,789 COVID cases, the largest daily number to date.
- A major analysis of the Omicron variant carried out by the UK Health Security Agency indicates people catching it are 50–70% less likely to require hospital treatment.
- The COVID Symptom Study warns that as many as half of those experiencing cold-like symptoms could actually have COVID, and urges people in such a situation to take a COVID test.
- Clarence House confirms that the Queen will spend Christmas Day with the Duke and Duchess of Cornwall.
- Scotland's Deputy First Minister John Swinney announces that nightclubs will close for three weeks from 27 December.
- Figures released by the UK Health Security bench indicate as many as 19,000 NHS staff were absent from work in England on 19 December due to COVID related reasons.

==== 24 December ====
- A further 122,186 COVID cases are reported, the third day the figure has been over 100,000.
- Data from the Office for National Statistics indicates that1.7 million people in England had COVID during the preceding week, the highest figure since Autumn 2020.
- Dr Jenny Harries, the chief executive of the UK Health Security Agency describes data indicating the Omicron variant is less serious than the Delta variant as a “glimmer of hope”.
- The UK government announces the temporary relaxation of immigration rules for overseas care workers in order to make it easier t recruit and keep care staff.
- The number of Christmas Eve shoppers on the high streets of city centres is down significantly on the same day the reviews week, early data shows. In London, where Omicron is widespread, the number of town centre shoppers is believed to be down by as much as 30.3%.
- The Duke and Duchess of Cambridge organise a special carol concert for people who helped their communities during the pandemic at which the Duchess makes a surprise appearance playing the piano.

==== 25 December ====
- Vaccination centres in England are remaining open over the festive period in order to facilitate the ongoing vaccination programme. The programme is suspended over the holidays in Wales though. Test centres remain open in Northern Ireland.
- In an interview with the BBC, Cardinal Vincent Nichols, the Archbishop of Westminster and leader of the Roman Catholic Church in England and Wales, urges the UK government not to close churches again in the event that restrictions are tightened after Christmas.
- The most frequent symptoms of Covid caused by Omicron are, "a running nose, headaches, fatigue, sneezing and sore throats." Omicron affects the upper respiratory tract more than previous variants making it more transmissible and also causing cold-like symptoms. Experts advise the government to update advice on symptoms urgently.
- Newly published documents show that the golf course owned by former president of the United States Donald Trump and located in Scotland claimed over £3,000,000 furlough money from the UK government.

==== 26 December ====
- Tighter COVID restrictions come into force in Scotland, Wales and Northern Ireland, limiting the hospitality sector and reintroducing social distancing, as well as placing limits on the numbers at social gatherings.
- The latest health statistics show that 51 million first doses of a COVID vaccine have been administered, along with 47 million second doses.

==== 27 December ====
- Both England and Scotland continue to report high numbers of COVID cases, with data for the Christmas holiday released. England reported 113,628 new cases on 25 December, 103,558 on 26 December and 98,515 on 27 December, while Scotland reported 8,252 cases on 25 December, 11,030 for 26 December and 10,562 on 27 December.
- Health Secretary Sajid Javid confirms there will be no new restrictions for England before the new year, but urges people to celebrate the occasion cautiously and outside if possible.
- New data from analysts Springboard shows a 32% decline in post-Christmas high street sales when compared to 27 December 2019.

==== 28 December ====
- The UK government's decision to avoid new COVID restrictions in England before the new year is disputed by a number of scientists, who describe it as "the greatest divergence between scientific advice and legislation" since the pandemic started.
- Care Minister Gillian Keegan urges people to enjoy themselves at new year but to be cautious by taking a lateral flow test before they attend any events.
- High levels of demand for PCR tests have left some people waiting up to five days for their results, meaning they have had to alter Christmas plans due to having to self-isolate until they receive a negative test. The UK Health Security Agency apologises to those who have had to wait "a little longer" than usual.
- Innsbruck Airport refuses 110 Britons entry into Austria because they did not follow updated COVID restrictions introduced on Boxing Day that require a negative PCR test 48 hours before travelling.
- A further 117,093 daily cases are reported for England, its highest number so far.
- Figures for COVID cases in Wales over Christmas are released, showing 12,378 cases were reported in the 48 hours up to Boxing Day.
- Figures produced by aviation analytics company Cirium indicate a 71% decrease in the number of international flights to and from the UK during 2021, with 406,060 international flights operated in 2021, compared with 1,399,170 in 2019.

==== 29 December ====
- The UK reports 183,037 new COVID cases, the largest number to date, although it is the first time data has been reported for the whole of the UK since 24 December.
- Pharmacists are warning of patchy supplies of lateral flow tests following changes to self-isolation rules in England that allow anyone testing positive for COVID to end their self-isolation after seven days (rather than ten) if they provide a negative test.
- Scots are warned not to travel to England as a way of circumventing Scotland's tighter COVID rules that have seen New Year celebrations cancelled north of the border.
- Health Secretary Sajid Javid criticises the Welsh Government's decision to ban outdoor mass exercise as disproportionate and unjustified after Parkrun events were cancelled in Wales.
- Police appeal for information following the appearance of video footage of an anti-vaccination demonstration at a COVID testing centre in Milton Keynes during which a woman is seen to apparently pick up medical equipment and papers from the facility then dump them in a bin.

==== 30 December ====
- In anticipation of the possibility of an increase in hospitalisations because of the Omicron variant, NHS England announce plans to set up COVID "surge hubs" at eight hospital sites, each with capacity for 100 patients. Building work will begin in January 2022, with sites being pinpointed for a further 4,000 beds.
- The trade unions representing doctors and nurses, the British Medical Association and Royal College of Nursing, have called for NHS staff to be prioritised for lateral flow COVID tests.
- Health Secretary Sajid Javid says the UK government plans to triple the supply of lateral flow tests to 300 million per month by February 2021.
- The Welsh Government announces that Wales will lend England four million lateral flow tests to help with the current shortage of tests being experienced by England.
- France suspends its travel restrictions for UK nationals, allowing them to travel through France if they are going to their home in another European Union country.
- People with travel plans for New Year's Eve are being urged to alter them as rail strikes and COVID isolations lead to reduced services on some lines. Staff working for CrossCountry have planned strike action for New Year's Eve leading to a limited service on its routes, while Southern Trains have suspended services to London Victoria until 10 January 2022 due to what it describes as "coronavirus isolation and sickness".
- Wales moves forward by several days its plans to cut the self-isolation period of anyone testing positive for COVID from ten to seven days. A negative test will be required before the self-isolation period can be ended, with the changes coming into effect from New Year's Eve rather than 5 January 2022 as originally planned. Northern Ireland also announces a cut in the period from ten to seven days from New Year's Eve, with First Minister Paul Givan describing the decision as one made to avoid a "workforce crisis".
- The Technical Advice Cell, the scientific group which analyses data and advises the Welsh Government, advised a two-week post-Christmas lockdown as the only way of reducing COVID cases in a document published on 15 December, it is reported, then changed its mind two days later to recommend a four-week lockdown. Ministers met the following day and announced that nightclubs would close.

==== 31 December ====
- In his New Year message, Prime Minister Boris Johnson says the situation is “incomparably better” than at the previous New Year, but warns people to be cautious as they celebrate.
- The anti-COVID drug Paxlovid, which can cut hospitalisation in vulnerable people by as much as 89%, is approved for use in the UK.
- Data produced by the UK Health Security Agency suggests that a booster vaccine is 88% effective against requiring hospital treatment because of the Omicron variant.
- Although official events to celebrate New Year were cancelled in London and Edinburgh, crowds gather at both locations to welcome in 2022. London's fireworks display goes ahead as planned, but people are asked to stay away because of the risk of COVID.

== See also ==
- Timeline of the COVID-19 pandemic in the United Kingdom (January–June 2020)
- Timeline of the COVID-19 pandemic in the United Kingdom (July–December 2020)
- Timeline of the COVID-19 pandemic in the United Kingdom (January–June 2021)
- Timeline of the COVID-19 pandemic in the United Kingdom (January–June 2022)
- Timeline of the COVID-19 pandemic in the United Kingdom (July–December 2022)
- Timeline of the COVID-19 pandemic in the United Kingdom (2023)
- Timeline of the COVID-19 pandemic in the United Kingdom (2024)
- Timeline of the COVID-19 pandemic in England (2021)
- Timeline of the COVID-19 pandemic in Scotland (2021)
- Timeline of the COVID-19 pandemic in Wales (2021)
- Timeline of the COVID-19 pandemic in Northern Ireland (2021)
- History of the COVID-19 pandemic in the United Kingdom
- COVID-19 vaccination programme in the United Kingdom
