= 2021 United Kingdom budget =

2021 United Kingdom budget may refer to:

- March 2021 United Kingdom budget
- October 2021 United Kingdom budget
