= Health and Social Care Levy =

Proposed health and social care tax in the United Kingdom

Health and Social Care Levy Act 2021
- Act of Parliament
- Parliament of the United Kingdom
- Long title: An Act to make provision imposing a tax (to be known as the health and social care levy), the proceeds of which are payable to the Secretary of State towards the cost of health care and social care, on amounts in respect of which national insurance contributions are, or would be if no restriction by reference to pensionable age were applicable, payable; and for connected purposes.
- Citation: 2021 c. 28

Dates
- Royal assent: 20 October 2021
- Repealed: 25 October 2022
Other legislation
Repealed by	Health and Social Care Levy (Repeal) Act 2022

Status: Repealed

History of passage through Parliament

Text of statute as originally enacted

Health and Social Care Levy (Repeal) Act 2022
- Act of Parliament
- Parliament of the United Kingdom
- Long title: An Act to make provision for and in connection with the repeal of the Health and Social Care Levy Act 2021.
- Citation: 2022 c. 43

Dates
- Royal assent: 25 October 2022
- Commencement: 25 October 2022
Other legislation
Repeals/revokes	Health and Social Care Levy Act 2021

Status: Spent

History of passage through Parliament

Text of statute as originally enacted

The Health and Social Care Levy was a proposed tax in the United Kingdom to be levied by the UK government for extra health spending, expected to be launched in 2023. Provision for the tax was given under the Health and Social Care Levy Act 2021 (c. 28) and it was designed to deal with the backlog of patients waiting for treatment following the COVID-19 pandemic as well as to improve social care. The tax, which was initially to be raised from a 1.25% increase in National Insurance contributions, was expected to raise £12 billion a year.

== Legislation ==
Details of the Health and Social Care Levy were announced in the House of Commons by Prime Minister Boris Johnson on 7 September 2021, with plans for its introduction in April 2023. Under the proposals, there would be firstly a rise in National Insurance contributions before a separate 1.25% tax on earned income would begin in April 2023. This would be calculated in the same way as National Insurance, except that it would also have been paid by workers who had reached State Pension age; the new tax would appear separately on payslips. Income tax rates on share dividends would also rise by 1.25%. The measures were expected to raise £12 billion a year.

At the same time it was confirmed that a share of the tax would go to the NHS in Scotland, NHS in Wales and Northern Ireland's Health and Social Care system, with an extra £1.1bn for Scotland, £700m for Wales, and £400m for Northern Ireland.

The proposals attracted criticism from some backbench MPs in Johnson's Conservative Party who accused him of reneging on a manifesto commitment made at the 2019 general election not to increase tax contributions. In response, Johnson accepted the tax broke a manifesto pledge, but argued the "global pandemic was in no-one's manifesto". Senior figures in the care sector expressed their concern the Health and Social Care Levy would not address problems with the system, with Nadra Ahmed, the executive chairman of the National Care Association describing it as "misleading because the body of the plan [is] about NHS recovery". Political parties in Northern Ireland criticised the plans as "inequitable" and "regressive". On 12 September 2021, HM Revenue and Customs predicted the tax would have a "significant" impact on wages, inflation, and company profits, and could also lead to the breakdown of families. In response, Health Secretary Sajid Javid said it was the fairest way to fund investment.

On 8 September 2021, MPs voted in favour of the tax rise plan by 319 votes to 248, a majority of 71. On 14 September, the Health and Social Care Levy Bill, the legislation enacting the tax, passed its third reading in the House of Commons with MPs voting 307–251 in favour, a majority of 56.

== Subsequent events ==
The October 2021 budget implemented a 1.25% increase in National Insurance contributions, effective from April 2022, as an initial step towards the levy.

The increase was reversed by new chancellor of the exchequer Kwasi Kwarteng under the Truss ministry: the rate reverted to 12% from 6 November 2022, and money for health and social care would now come from general taxation. The 2021 act was repealed in October 2022.
