= Calum Semple =

British physician and academic

Malcolm Gracie "Calum" Semple is a British physician and academic. He is Professor of Child Health and Outbreak Medicine at the University of Liverpool and a consultant respiratory paediatrician at Alder Hey Children's Hospital Liverpool.

Semple was an undergraduate medical student at the Middlesex Hospital Medical School when he met Richard Tedder at the hospital Burns supper, both playing their bagpipes. This led to Semple interrupting his medical studies to read an intercalated bachelor's tripos in cell pathology, immunology and virology supervised by Lewis Wolpert, Ivan Roitt, and Richard Tedder. During this time he contributed to probably the first description of what has become a core technique in molecular biology: quantitative polymerase chain reaction (qPCR). He continued to study clinical virology as a doctoral student supervised by Richard Tedder and Dr Clive Loveday at University College London. Semple completed his medical degree at Merton College, Oxford.

Semple led a clinical trial of Ebola convalescent plasma in Sierra Leone and a follow-up study of Ebola survivors with Dr Janet T Scott and Paul J Steptoe.

== Honours ==
Semple was awarded the Ebola Medal for Service in West Africa in 2016.

He was appointed Officer of the Order of the British Empire (OBE) in the 2020 Birthday Honours for services to the Covid-19 response.

In 2026 Semple became a Prix Galien UK Laureate for his joint leadership of the ISARIC4C study, the world’s largest prospective study of patients hospitalised with COVID-19. The Prix Galien is awarded by the Galien Foundation for innovations that benefit the human condition, and widely recognized as the biopharmaceutical industry's highest accolade.
