= Richard Tedder =

British virologist (born 1946)

Richard Tedder is an English virologist and microbiologist, was head of the Department of Virology at the University College London Medical School, and worked as virologist at Public Health England

== Life ==
The youngest son of Marshal of the Royal Air Force Lord Tedder, Richard Tedder was born 1946 and educated at Dauntsey's School, Glenalmond College, the University of Cambridge and the Middlesex Hospital. He holds degrees in Zoology and Medicine; he has been a Medical Virologist since 1975.

He was research assistant to Richard Harrison at the London Hospital Medical School, then worked with J. D. H. Slater at the Middlesex Hospital from 1973 to 1974 and with A. Grabham at Kettering General Hospital for a year, before being appointed as assistant lecturer and honorary senior house orderly registrar in the School of Pathology at Middlesex Hospital Medical School (1975 to 1976). From 1977 to 1979 he was Wellcome Research Fellow at Middlesex in the Department of Medical Microbiology's virology section and a lecturer in the same department from 1980 to 1981. He was appointed a senior lecturer at University College London Medical School in 1981, head of the Division of Virology there in 1982, continuing to 1995, in 1991 being appointed a professor of medical virology. He became head of the Department of Virology in 1995.

In 2001, Tedder wrote to Sir Brian Follett, who chaired 'The Royal Society Inquiry into Infectious Diseases in Livestock'; the Inquiry produced a report examining the scientific aspects of the 2001 United Kingdom foot-and-mouth crisis, such as the efficacy of vaccinations and the way the virus spreads. Tedder wrote that "it came as something of a surprise" to him that Follett had not involved any virologists in his work.

On severe acute respiratory syndrome, or Sars, he said in 2003 "What Sars has done is rekindle the concept of the global village. Somebody's problem on a peninsula in South East Asia is Toronto's problem a few days later."

Tedder's first published work was on Hepatitis B, with later work on the diagnostic development and treatment of HIV and Hepatitis C. He also has interests in chronic viral infections of the liver. He is a consultant virologist to the National Blood Service and a member of several Department of Health, Royal College of Pathologists and SHA working parties and groups in the fields of virology and pathology.

== Other appointments ==
- Honorary consultant, Department of Microbiological Reagents, Public Health Laboratory Service, Colindale, 1981-
- Short-term external consultant, Global Project on AIDS, World Health Organisation, Geneva, Switzerland, 1987-
- Director of Virology Service, UCL Hospitals 1991 onwards
- Honorary consultant microbiologist, North London Blood Transfusion Centre, Colindale, 1981 onwards
- Department of Health Advisory Group on Hepatitis
- Consultant virologist to the National Blood Service, 1995 onwards
- Head of Blood Borne Virus Unit at the Centre for Infections, Health Protection Agency, Colindale
- Standing Advisory Committee on Transfusion Transmitted Infections
- Advisory Committee on the Safety of Blood, Tissues and Organs (SaBTO)

== Membership of professional bodies ==
- Fellow of the Royal College of Physicians
- Fellow of the Royal College of Pathologists, and Council Member
- Society for General Microbiology
- European Association for the Study of the Liver
- European Rapid Viral Diagnosis Group
