= COVID-19 passports in the United Kingdom =

COVID-19 prevention measures in the UK

Trials to assess the effectiveness of an immunity passport scheme, also known as a COVID passport or COVID certification scheme, were confirmed by the UK government on 3 April 2021 as a way of helping to restart public events in England during the COVID-19 pandemic. The announcement was made following much discussion and speculation about the idea by politicians and in the British media. The government announced that trials of a scheme for England would begin on 16 April, starting with a comedy evening in Liverpool.

In December 2021, COVID passports or similar verification methods became mandatory to access certain high-density venues per government regulations to address the spread of the infections Omicron variant of COVID-19.

== History ==
The idea of some kind of immunity or vaccine passport was first mentioned in February 2021, when the Greek Prime Minister said his country would welcome British holidaymakers who had been vaccinated. The UK government ruled out the idea of issuing a vaccine passports for those who had been vaccinated. On 23 February, Prime Minister Boris Johnson announced a review into the idea of vaccine passports to allow people to go on holiday and into venues, describing the proposal as having "deep and complex issues". On 25 March, Johnson said an update on proposals would be given in April, but suggests it may not be possible to introduce such a scheme until every adult in the UK has been offered a vaccine.

On 2 April 2021, The Daily Telegraph reported that COVID passports would be trialled at a series of venues to test their use, prompting a group of more than 70 MPs from across the political spectrum to voice their opposition to the idea. The group, which included Jeremy Corbyn, a former leader of the Labour Party and Iain Duncan Smith, a former leader of the Conservative Party, describing it as "dangerous, discriminatory and counterproductive". In response the UK government said that no decisions had been made as regards the idea.

On 3 April the government confirmed that a COVID passport system would be trialled as a way of enabling large events, such as sports and music events, to restart. The first trial was announced to take place at a comedy evening at Liverpool's Hot Water Comedy Club on 16 April and continue at other events in England through to mid-May. The government subsequently confirmed that any such scheme would be time limited.

A 2021 FA Cup Semi-Final match on 18 April, the 2021 EFL Cup Final on 25 April and the 2021 FA Cup Final on 15 May were also announced as potential candidates for trialling the scheme. The passport, a certificate, would be issued upon the supply of information including whether a person has been vaccinated, any recent negative test, or natural immunity through recent positive test.

On 11 May 2021, the UK government announced that from 17 May people in England who had received both COVID vaccines would be able to use the NHS app as a vaccine passport; a paper version would also be available by calling 119.

In May 2021, a scheme in Scotland was unveiled that allows people to download a certificate giving details of their vaccination status from the NHS Scotland website. The document is intended for anyone planning to travel overseas, and people were advised to download it 21 days before travelling. On 22 May it was reported that a security flaw in the software would allow people to edit their vaccination status by using popular computer programs. The Scottish Government said it was working to rectify the situation. On 1 September 2021, it was announced that vaccine passports would be required for entry to nightclubs and many large events in Scotland.

There has been some investigation into the possible impact that vaccine passports may have in the UK. This evidence shows that vaccine passports may lower inclination to vaccinate and may discriminate against certain socio-demographic groups.

In December 2021, new regulations made a COVID passport, equivalent proof of vaccination, or negative lateral flow test mandatory for entry into many high-density venues in England to combat the spread of the Omicron variant.

== NHS COVID Pass ==
NHS COVID Pass exists in England, and Wales, with a similar verification scheme (not using the same name) available in Scotland.

The Department of Health has introduced an automated method for Northern Irish citizens who have received both their COVID-19 vaccinations in Northern Ireland to apply for COVID vaccination certification.

The England domestic NHS COVID Pass was discontinued on 12 May 2022, following the discontinuation of the domestic NHS COVID Pass letter on 1 April 2022. As of 9 June 2022 the England NHS COVID Pass is only used for international travel.
