= October 2021 United Kingdom budget =

- Presented: Wednesday 27 October 2021
- Country: United Kingdom
- Parliament: 58th
- Party: Conservative Party
- Chancellor: Rishi Sunak

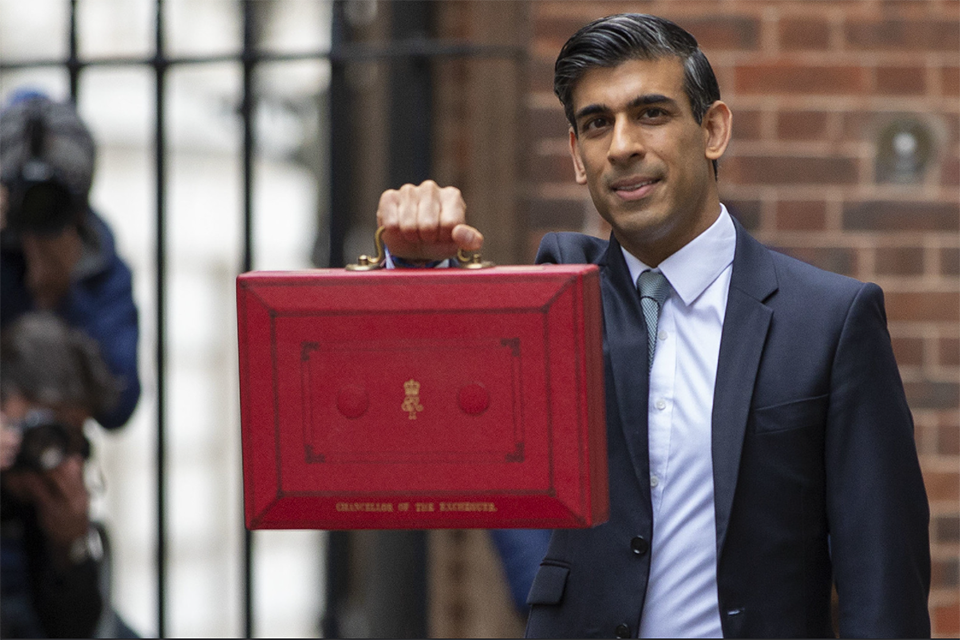
Rishi Sunak making the announcement of the autumn budget

The October 2021 United Kingdom budget, officially known as the Autumn Budget and Spending Review 2021. A Stronger Economy for the British People, was a budget statement made by Chancellor of the Exchequer Rishi Sunak on 27 October 2021. It was the third and final consecutive budget delivered by Sunak before his resignation in July 2022.

Many of the announcements to be made in the budget were previewed before budget day, drawing criticism and anger from the House of Commons. In response to the criticism, Sunak said the budget "begins the work of preparing for a new economy".

== Key issues ==
BBC News reported six key issues expected to be addressed in the budget:

- Value-added tax on energy bills for the crises in fuel supply and natural gas suppliers
- Alcohol tax
- Capital gains tax
- Student loans
- Minimum wage rise
- Pension rate allowance

Other issues included regional transport, High Speed 2 and the Northern Powerhouse.

== Changes announced ==
The budget increased in-work support through the Universal Credit system by increasing the work allowances by £500 a year, and reducing the post-tax deduction taper rate from 63% to 55%. It also simplified alcohol duties in a way which benefited lower-strength drinks and cut the surcharge on UK bank profits to 3% and raised the surcharge threshold to £100m.

Development funding of £5m was allocated for the reopening of Wellington and Cullompton railway stations. Devon County Council was given £50,000 toward the cost of creating of a new Tavistock railway station and the reconstruction of the line to serve it.

£560m of investment was announced for the Levelling Up White Paper.

== Response ==
Labour leader Keir Starmer tested positive for COVID-19 and so was replaced by Ed Miliband at Prime Minister's Questions. Shadow Chancellor of the Exchequer Rachel Reeves responded to the budget in the House of Commons. Leader of the Liberal Democrats Ed Davey said the budget made Sunak appear "out of touch". Tom Harris in The Daily Telegraph described the budget as Brownite.

The Institute for Fiscal Studies (IFS) said the budget would leave millions of people worse off in 2022, predicting that inflation and higher taxes on incomes would offset small wage increases for middle earners, while poorer households would feel "real pain". The Resolution Foundation calculated, that the budget would increase incomes of the poorest fifth of households by 2.8% but reduce middle incomes by about 2%. The budget increased public spending to levels not seen since the 1970s, according to The Daily Telegraph.

The IFS also noted that changes to alcohol duty may not apply to Northern Ireland because of the Northern Ireland protocol agreed between the UK and the European Union following Brexit.
