= Timeline of the COVID-19 pandemic in the United Kingdom (January–June 2022) =

Graph of COVID-19 cases for January–June 2022 from government data

The following is a timeline of the COVID-19 pandemic in the United Kingdom from January to June 2022.

There are significant differences in the legislation and the reporting between the countries of the UK: England, Scotland, Northern Ireland, and Wales. The numbers of cases and deaths are reported on a government Web site updated daily during the pandemic. The UK-wide COVID Symptom Study based on surveys of four million participants, endorsed by authorities in Scotland and Wales, run by health science company ZOE, and analysed by King's College London researchers, publishes daily estimates of the number of new and total current COVID-19 infections (excluding care homes) in UK regions, without restriction to only laboratory-confirmed cases.

== Events ==
=== January 2022 ===
==== 1 January ====
- A further 162,572 COVID cases are reported for England, the highest daily figure so far.
- Although official events to celebrate New Year were cancelled in London and Edinburgh, crowds gather at both locations to welcome in 2022. London's fireworks display goes ahead as planned, but people are asked to stay away because of the risk of COVID.
- Professors Chris Whitty and Jonathan Van-Tam, the respective Chief Medical Officer and Deputy Chief Medical officer for England, are both knighted in the 2022 New Year Honours. Also to be recognised with Honours are Dr Jenny Harries, chief executive of the UK Health Security Agency, and Dr June Raine, chief executive of the vaccines regulator, the Medicines and Healthcare products Regulatory Agency, who are both made dames. Scotland's Chief Medical Officer, Dr Gregor Smith and Wales's Chief Medical Officer, Dr Frank Atherton are also knighted.
- Writing in the Daily Mail, Health Secretary Sajid Javid says further COVID restrictions must be that "absolute last resort" and that the UK must learn to "live alongside" the virus in 2022.
- Chris Hopson, chief executive of NHS Providers, says the next few days will be vital to understanding the effect of the Omicron variant on the NHS.
- With the continued spread of Omicron variant cases, the UK government warns of a worst-case scenario that could see as many as 25% of the country's workforce absent. Ministers are tasked with developing "robust contingency plans" for the public sector in such a situation.
- A COVID-19 testing centre is deliberately set on fire in Dumbarton.

==== 2 January ====
- A further 137,583 COVID cases are reported for England and Wales, down on the previous day's figure.
- Ministers have said there is nothing in the data to suggest new COVID rules are needed for England. Health Minister Edward Argar urges "cool, calm heads", while Steve Barclay says there have been "significant behaviour change" as a result of Plan B measures.
- The UK government announces that face masks are to be worn in schools in England when classes resume following the Christmas holiday.

==== 3 January ====
- During a visit to a vaccination centre in Aylesbury, Buckinghamshire, Prime Minister Boris Johnson says that England must stick with Plan B measures as the NHS comes under increasing pressure, but adds the UK is in a "much better position" than the previous winter.
- The Royal College of Nursing urges the UK government to take a more cautious approach as the Omicron variant continues to spread.
- Scotland reports 20,217 cases, its highest daily figures so far, and the first time cases have gone above 20,000.
- Staff shortages continue to affect the hospitality and retail sectors, with warnings of closures if they worsen.
- A letter signed by Education Secretary Nadhim Zahawi advises schools in England to prepare for staff absences by merging classes into larger groups, and to consider what it describes as "flexible" teaching options.
- Figures produced by NHS Digital and obtained by the Press Association show that thousands of people in England required hospital treatment during the lockdowns of 2020 and 2021 after undertaking activities such as DIY, remote work, cookery and dog walking.
- Staff shortages at local authorities have led to the cancellation of refuse collections across the UK, it is reported.

==== 4 January ====
- Sir Andrew Pollard, chair of the Joint Committee on Vaccination and Immunisation, warns that giving booster vaccines every six months is "not sustainable", and there needs to be more evidence before a fourth vaccine is implemented.
- A record 218,724 daily COVID cases are recorded for England and Scotland; it is the first time the daily figure has been over 200,000, but delays in reporting some cases over Christmas likely to be responsible for the high number.
- At a Downing Street press conference, Prime Minister Boris Johnson announces that around 100,000 critical workers will be offered daily COVID tests from 10 January in order to help to keep the Omicron variant at bay, but is confident further restrictions may not be needed, telling reporters "we have a chance to ride out this Omicron wave without shutting down our country once again".
- A number of hospital trusts have now declared critical incidents, although it is not unusual for that to happen in January.
- An article by BBC News Health Correspondent Nick Triggle points to a difficult month ahead due to the rise in Omicron variant infections, but says early evidence is suggesting the current wave will be different to previous waves, with Omicron causing less severe illness, and hospitalisations five times lower than at the same point in 2021.
- ScotRail puts in place a temporary revised timetable until 28 January amid a high number of absences among its staff due to COVID.
- The Rail Delivery Group estimates as many as one in ten rail workers is absent from work due to COVID-related issues, with services subject to cancellation and amended timetables. As well as ScotRail, LNER and CrossCountry services are also badly affected.
- Hong Kong announces the suspension of all flights from eight countries, including the UK and US, for two weeks from 8 January.

==== 5 January ====
- A further 194,747 COVID cases are recorded for the UK.
- As figures suggest one in fifteen people in the UK had COVID on New Year's Eve, Prime Minister Boris Johnson confirms that Plan B measures in England will stay in place for a further three weeks.
- In the House of Commons Johnson is urged by Conservative MPs to outline an exit strategy from COVID restrictions, and to explain how the UK can "live with this virus".
- Rules regarding PCR tests in England are to change from the following week, meaning anyone testing positive for COVID with a lateral flow test but who have no symptoms will no longer need to follow the test with a PCR test; they will still be required to self-isolate for seven days though. Wales also announces the same changes, but plans to bring them in from the following day.
- At least ten hospital trusts in England have declared critical incidents due to COVID, with Manchester University NHS Foundation Trust being the latest to do so.
- The Welsh Rugby Union is considering playing some of its 2022 Six Nations Championship matches in England due to crowd restrictions imposed by the Welsh Government.
- The family of Captain Sir Tom Moore thank Milton Keynes radio station MKFM for being the first media organisation to get behind his 2020 fundraising campaign for the NHS.

==== 6 January ====
- Data from the UK Health Security Agency shows London is no longer the epicentre of COVID infections and that areas of the north west, such as Liverpool, Manchester and the Lake District, are recording higher cases. The data also shows the uptake of booster vaccines has also slowed.
- Prime Minister Boris Johnson says that anti-vaccination campaigners who are spreading misinformation about COVID through social media are "totally wrong" and that it is time "to call them out".
- An Office for National Statistics survey suggests as many as 1.3 million people in the UK have Long COVID symptoms that persist four weeks after an initial infection.
- On the eve of changes to the rules regarding PCR tests for travellers to and from England, Transport Secretary Grant Shapps describes them as having "outlived [their] usefulness" because Omicron is now "widespread and worldwide".
- Details of a review used by the UK government to reintroduce face masks in schools for England comes to light in which the evidence of their effectiveness is described as "not conclusive".
- Professor John Watkins, an epidemiologist for Public Health Wales and an honorary research fellow at the University of Cardiff says it is time to return COVID restrictions to pre-Omicron levels because the booster programme has made the risk from it no worse than the Delta variant.
- Scotland reduces the period of self-isolation following a positive COVID test from ten to seven days, bringing it in line with England, Wales and Northern Ireland.
- The number of confirmed COVID cases in Scotland since the start of the pandemic has passed one million.

==== 7 January ====
- From 4am people in England who are fully vaccinated are no longer required to take a pre-departure COVID test before travelling abroad, while anyone arriving in England who has had both vaccines is not required to self-isolate while waiting for the results of a PCR test. Similar changes are also made in Scotland.
- The change in travel rules leads to a surge in holiday bookings; travel company Jet2 reports bookings have returned to "around pre-Covid levels".
- Confirming there is to be no relaxation of COVID rules in Wales, First Minister Mark Drakeford accuses Prime Minister Boris Johnson of failing to take the necessary precautions to protect people in England.
- COVID-related staff absences in the NHS in England increased threefold during December 2021 according to BBC News, while other reports suggest the number of staff absences increased by a third from 60,316 at the beginning of December to 82,384 on 2 January. The nursing trade union, the Royal College of Nursing, describes the situation as "simply not safe".
- A further 178,250 COVID cases are recorded in the UK.
- Figures produced by the Office for National Statistics estimate that one in fifteen people tested positive for COVID in the final week of December 2021, which equates to around 3.7 million people having the virus.
- Around 200 military personnel have been deployed to help short-staffed hospitals and ambulance services in England.
- Health Secretary Sajid Javid says he is concerned about a rise in hospital admissions among older people.
- The Joint Committee on Vaccination and Immunisation (JCVI) says a fourth vaccine dose is not yet needed since the booster dose continues to provide good protection against the Omicron variant in older adults.
- Drinks arranged by a "senior No. 10 official" in May 2020 around five days after Boris Johnson and other staff were pictured at another gathering may have broken COVID rules according to former Downing Street special adviser Dominic Cummings.

==== 8 January ====
- The number of UK recorded COVID deaths passes 150,000, as a further 313 deaths take the total to 150,057. A further 146,390 new cases are recorded. Prime Minister Boris Johnson says that COVID has taken a "terrible toll on our country".
- Business owners in Wales have expressed their concern for the economy if Wales plays its Six Nations matches in England as a way of getting around prohibitions on large crowds, with estimates each game could cost Cardiff alone £20million.

==== 9 January ====
- Clive Kay, chief executive of King's College Hospital, expresses his concern that the mandatory requirement for NHS staff to be vaccinated, which begins in April 2022, will lead to an exodus of staff, as the latest figures show one in ten NHS workers have not had the vaccine.
- Education Secretary Nadhim Zahawi tells the BBC the UK is on the road "from pandemic to endemic" and that cutting the COVID isolation period from seven to five days would "certainly help" current staff shortages in healthcare. He also rejects reports that charges could be introduced for lateral flow tests except for those in high risk situations and/or with symptoms.
- Dr Clive Dix, former chair of the Vaccine Taskforce, calls for an overhaul of government strategy on vaccines and testing, suggesting mass vaccination should end following the booster campaign, and says it is "pointless trying to stop Covid infection".
- Mark Harper, chair of the Parliamentary COVID Recovery Group, warns Prime Minister Boris Johnson he faces a backbench rebellion if he attempts to extend COVID restrictions beyond 26 January.
- BBC News reports on the plight of Chester F.C., whose ground straddles the England–Wales border and which has been issued warnings by North Wales Police and Flintshire Council for playing two games over Christmas at which 2,000 spectators were in attendance. Such gatherings are prohibited in Wales, but allowed in England. The club says that it will face financial hardship if spectators are not allowed to attend games.

==== 10 January ====
- Witnesses tell BBC News that as many as 100 people were invited to a "bring-your-own-booze" drinks event in the Downing Street garden while the UK was still in the first COVID lockdown and social gatherings were prohibited. The allegations have emerged following the publication of an email by ITV News and dated 20 May 2020, which invited people to "socially distanced drinks in the No 10 garden this evening". ITV News alleged around 40 people attended, and ate picnic food and were drinking, including Prime Minister Boris Johnson and his wife Carrie. Johnson declines to confirm whether or not he was present, while the Metropolitan Police says it is in contact with the UK government over "widespread reporting relating to alleged breaches" of COVID rules.
- A UK government campaign is launched to encourage pregnant women to have the vaccine after data from the UK Obstetric Surveillance System indicated that 95% of pregnant women admitted to hospital with COVID are unvaccinated.
- Furniture retailer Ikea cuts sick pay for unvaccinated employees required to self-isolate because of COVID, but says it will consider individual cases on a case-by-case basis. Wessex Water has also similarly cut sick pay.
- The findings of new research published in Nature Communications suggests natural defences against a common cold could also offer some protection against COVID.
- The media regulator Ofcom says it will not launch an inquiry into the ITV series Lorraine following an incorrect statement regarding COVID made on the 6 December 2021 edition of the programme by Dr Hilary Jones, who had said 90% of COVID hospital patients were unvaccinated. The figure equates to intensive care patients rather than general hospital patients, and a statement correcting this error was made two days later.

==== 11 January ====
- People in England without COVID symptoms no longer need a PCR test to confirm a positive lateral flow test following a change in the rules.
- Figures published by Heathrow Airport show that around 600,000 travellers cancelled flight plans in December 2021 because of uncertainty over the Omicron variant.
- BBC News reports that sources have claimed senior political staff had to intervene to prevent a number of leaving dos from going ahead at 10 Downing Street in the first half of 2021, while restrictions on social gatherings remained in place.
- Labour and Conservative MPs have demanded Johnson confirm whether or not he attended a Downing Street gathering on 20 May 2020.
- Two snap polls from Savanta ComRes and YouGov/Sky indicate a majority of those questioned believe Johnson should resign as Prime Minister over the Partygate scandal. In response Paymaster General Michael Ellis says the Prime Minister "is going nowhere".
- Data shows that in the same week as the 20 May gathering, more than 800 fines were issued for breach of COVID regulations that limited people to meeting up with one other person outdoors.
- Data shows that 6.6% of teachers in England, roughly one in 12, were absent from schools in England during the first week of the winter term.
- First Minister of Scotland Nicola Sturgeon confirms some COVID rules will be relaxed in Scotland from Monday 17 January, with the limit of 500 spectators at outdoor events such as rugby and football matches removed. But restrictions on indoor venues will remain until at least 24 January.
- Former Health Secretary Matt Hancock has tested positive for COVID for a second time.
- English football club Chester F.C. postpones a forthcoming match scheduled for Saturday 15 January following accusations it broke Welsh Government COVID rules which restrict the number of spectators.

==== 12 January ====
- Speaking at Prime Minister's Questions, Prime Minister Boris Johnson admits that he attended a party in the garden of 10 Downing Street held on 20 May 2020. He apologises for doing so, but says he "believed implicitly" the event was a works gathering, and that on reflection he "should have sent everyone back inside". Senior political figures, including Scottish Conservative leader Douglas Ross and prominent Conservative backbencher William Wragg, call for Johnson to resign.
- The High Court of England and Wales rules that the UK government's use of a "VIP lane" to award contracts for personal protection equipment (PPE) was unlawful.
- Office for National Statistics data estimates around 4.3 million people had a COVID infection in the week up to 7 January, up from 3.7 million the previous week.
- BBC News reports that around 3,000 people testing positive for COVID have received antiviral tablets in a trial being run by Public Health Wales, Health and Care Research Wales and Cardiff University, and which began on 8 December 2021.

==== 13 January ====
- The Daily Telegraph reports on a further two alleged parties, said to have been held at 10 Downing Street in April 2021 on the eve of the funeral of Prince Philip, Duke of Edinburgh, when the UK was observing a period of national mourning following the Duke's death the previous week, and as England remained in Step Two lockdown restrictions where people were only permitted to meet up outdoors. The parties are believed to have been leaving dos for Downing Street officials, while Prime Minister Boris Johnson is thought to have departed for the weekend to Chequers.
- Tortoise Media reports Boris Johnson commuted between Downing Street and his second home, Chequers, between 16 March and 27 March 2020, when non-essential travel was banned. This is confirmed by Downing Street.
- The Metropolitan Police confirms it will wait for the outcome of the inquiry into the May 2020 party attended by Boris Johnson before deciding whether to launch an investigation.
- The Information Commissioner's Office warns those caught up in the investigation not to delete messages relating to the Downing Street gatherings, warning that to do so constitutes a criminal offence.
- Professor Sir Jonathan Van-Tam announces he will step down as England's deputy chief medical officer.
- Health Secretary Sajid Javid confirms the period of self-isolation in England following a positive COVID test is to be cut to five full days from Monday 17 January.
- The number of people on hospital waiting lists in England reaches six million, with roughly one in 20 waiting for routine operations such as knee surgery for over a year.
- France announces it will relax its restrictions for travellers from the following day, allowing those who are fully vaccinated to travel without a compelling reason and to skip the requirement to self-isolate on arrival.
- BBC News reports that retailers Ocado and Next have cut sick pay for unvaccinated employees required to self-isolate because of COVID.
- Almost one in three local authorities in England report they are having to ration care for elderly and disabled people because of Omicron variant-related absences.
- The Daily Telegraph reports that the leader of the opposition, Keir Starmer, had been pictured drinking beer with party staff in a constituency office, in May 2021, when the country was still under Covid restrictions. The Labour Party said "no rules had been broken".

==== 14 January ====
- The Omicron variant is relatively mild for most adults and this can be stated with good confidence, according to the UK Health Security Agency assessment. This is mainly because vaccines give good protection against serious illness from the Omicron variant.
- Data shows that more babies are being admitted to hospital as a precautionary measure during the Omicron phase of the pandemic, but they are not very ill. Around 50 babies have been treated in hospital during the latest wave.
- A further 99,652 COVID cases are recorded in the UK, the first time for 23 days that the daily figure has been below 100,000.
- Downing Street apologises to Buckingham Palace for two parties held on the eve of the funeral of Prince Philip, Duke of Edinburgh.
- It emerges that Kate Josephs, a former Director-General of the COVID Taskforce, hosted leaving drinks in the Cabinet Office in December 2020, while London was under Tier 3 regulations. She apologises and says she is co-operating fully with the inquiry into gatherings at Westminster.
- Fresh allegations are made of regular weekly parties being held at Downing Street throughout COVID lockdowns in England, and that staff held "wine-time Fridays" between 4pm and 7pm on Fridays.
- First Minister of Wales Mark Drakeford confirms that most COVID restrictions in Wales will be lifted over the next two weeks if cases continue to fall and as Wales moves to Alert Level Zero.

==== 15 January ====
- The UK records a further 81,713 COVID cases, the lowest daily number since 15 December.
- No deaths are recorded for Northern Ireland on this date.
- Downing Street has urged the public to reserve judgement on the Partygate controversy until an inquiry into it has concluded, but six Conservative MPs have so far publicly declared they have written to Boris Johnson urging him to resign as Prime Minister in the wake of revelations about parties during lockdown. Tobias Ellwood, chair of the Defence Select Committee, tells the BBC he believes Johnson should "lead or step aside".
- There are calls for former COVID Taskforce chief executive Kate Josephs to resign from her current post of chief executive of Sheffield City Council following revelations she held farewell drinks at the Cabinet Office.
- The Daily Telegraph reports that Prime Minister's wife Carrie Johnson was pictured hugging a friend in September 2020 at a time when people were urged to maintain a social distance of two metres from anyone not in their household.
- Shadow Health Secretary Wes Streeting sets out the Labour Party's ten point plan for living with COVID. It includes COVID tests manufactured in the UK, the prevention of any future sale of the UK's vaccine manufacturing centre and better ventilation for schools.

==== 16 January ====
- Labour Party leader Sir Keir Starmer says a photograph of him drinking with a number of colleagues in a constituency office while England was still under COVID regulations that limited social gatherings is "no breach of the rules" and that there was "no comparison" with the Prime Minister.

==== 17 January ====
- The booster programme is opened to teenagers aged 16 and 17.
- Avanti West Coast, c2c, East Midlands Railway and South Western Railway all introduce emergency timetables in order to cope with staff shortages.
- Train operator Avanti West Coast reduces its services between London Euston and Manchester Piccadilly from three trains per hour to one train per hour in a bid to make the service more reliable while its staff experience a high number of absences due to COVID. The revised timetable is scheduled to be in place until 25 February with a weekly review.
- Education Secretary Nadhim Zahawi says that Prime Minister Boris Johnson is not in danger of losing his job following revelations about parties at Downing Street, and that "he's human and we make mistakes". But Conservative MP Steve Baker says his constituents are "about 60 to one against the PM".
- Fresh allegations are made by former Downing Street advisor Dominic Cummings that Prime Minister Johnson was warned about a lockdown party held on 20 May 2020, but "waved away" concerns. Downing Street says it is "untrue" that Johnson was "warned about the event" in advance.
- The Big Issue carries a story about an alleged party at the Home Office on 24 March 2021 where staff "mingled" and had drinks to celebrate a Home Office policy making the headlines on the BBC Six O'Clock News.
- Royal Mail publishes a list of 56 postcode areas affected by COVID staff absences that have led to slower than usual mail deliveries, and says it plans to "rotate deliveries" to minimise the delays. Areas affected include London, Glasgow, Manchester and Yorkshire.
- COVID regulations in Scotland are relaxed to allow large outdoor events such as football matches with spectators, to resume, but they require at least 50% of the crowd to be checked for vaccine certificates.

==== 18 January ====
- Prime Minister Boris Johnson "categorically" rejects claims he was told a drinks party in the garden of 10 Downing Street broke COVID regulations, saying "Nobody warned me that it was against the rules".
- Following Johnson's comments, Conservative MPs begin to openly speculate about a possible challenge to his leadership of the party.
- The Guardian reports that Johnson plans to scrap all COVID rules in England by March in a bid to regain the support of his MPs. This includes the requirement for anyone testing positive for COVID to self-isolate or face a £10,000 fine.
- Health Secretary Sajid Javid says he is "cautiously optimistic" that the final Plan B restrictions can be "substantially reduced" when they are reviewed the following week.
- A £550,000 COVID contract awarded to PR firm Public First, whose founders were friends of Dominic Cummings, is ruled lawful by the Court of Appeal.
- A cross-party committee is to decide the future of Sheffield City Council chief executive Kate Josephs after she held a leaving party at the Cabinet Office when leaving her job as the chief executive of the COVID Taskforce. The council says it will decide "what steps, if any, should be taken".
- First Minister of Scotland Nicola Sturgeon confirms COVID regulations will be further relaxed from Monday 24 January, with nightclubs reopening, large indoor events resuming and social distancing rules dropped.
- Birmingham's 112-year-old Electric Cinema, and the UK's oldest cinema, is reported to be reopening once again after being closed in March 2020 due to COVID.

==== 19 January ====
- Figures from the Office for National Statistics show a significant fall in the number of COVID cases, with data for the week ending 15 January showing 3.5 million infections, a fall from 4.3 million the previous week.
- At Prime Minister's Questions, the former cabinet minister David Davis joins calls for Boris Johnson to resign as Prime Minister, while shortly before PMQs, MP Christian Wakeford crosses the floor of the House of Commons from the Conservatives to the Labour Party, citing what he describes as Johnson's "disgraceful" conduct for doing so.
- Prime Minister Johnson confirms that England's Plan B COVID measures will not be renewed when they expire on 26 January. This will mean the requirement for COVID passports in venues such as nightclubs and at events such as football matches will end from 27 January, while remote work advice is also set to end with immediate effect. The compulsory wearing of facemasks on public transport and in enclosed spaces will end when the Plan B measures expire, but the government will continue to advise people to wear them in enclosed spaces, particularly if in the company of strangers, and facemasks in schools will be scrapped from 20 January.
- The children's commissioner for England, Dame Rachel de Souza, says she intends to literally "go out and find" as many as 100,000 children who are not attending school as expected following the pandemic.

==== 20 January ====
- Several large employers, including banks, insurers and advertising companies, say they have made plans for their staff to return to the office following the UK government's decision to end remote work advice in England with immediate effect.
- Conservative MP William Wragg has claimed opponents of Prime Minister Boris Johnson within the party have been blackmailed and threatened by Downing Street with bad publicity and cuts to services in their constituencies. Responding to the claims, Johnson says he has "seen no evidence" of such behaviour. Downing Street subsequently declines to investigate the claims.
- ITV News reports that Sue Gray, the civil servant investigating the Partygate scandal has uncovered an email warning the Prime Minister's private secretary, Martin Reynolds against holding a party at 10 Downing Street, which Political Editor Robert Peston describes as saying the party "should be cancelled because it broke the rules".
- Ministers in Northern Ireland agree to scrap the use of COVID passports in pubs and restaurants from Midday on 26 January.

==== 21 January ====
- The Daily Telegraph reports the Downing Street party held on the eve of the funeral of Prince Philip, Duke of Edinburgh went on until 1am.
- UK health officials are reported to be monitoring an offshoot of the Omicron variant which first appeared in December.
- Police have warned that anti-vax campaigners are attempting to use a crime number issued to them by the Metropolitan Police to clam vaccination centres are operating illegally. The crime number was issued following a complaint to the Met, but is merely an acknowledgement of the complaint.
- The NHS launches a publicity drive aimed at the four million people who remain unvaccinated and the 16 million who have not yet received a booster.
- The major incident declared in London in December by Mayor Sadiq Khan as Omicron cases spread in the city has been stood down.
- Scottish First Minister Nicola Sturgeon is reported to the UK Statistics Authority for "seriously" twisting Office for National Statistics figures relating to COVID during the previous day's First Minister's Questions.
- The period of self-isolation in Northern Ireland following a positive COVID test is cut from seven to five days. The rules requiring table service at pubs and restaurants are also relaxed.
- Wales scraps limits on the number of people who can attend sporting events, and lifts the rule of six requirements for pubs and restaurants operating outdoors. But while confirming the changes, First Minister Mark Drakeford accuses the UK government of caring more about distracting people from its troubles than it does about COVID.

==== 22 January ====
- The Royal College of GPs urges the UK government to extend the deadline for NHS staff in England to be vaccinated beyond 9 February in order to prevent a shortage of staff.
- Conservative MP William Wragg is to meet police about allegations of MPs being bullied by Downing Street officials.
- Ruth Davidson, the former leader of the Scottish Conservatives, describes Prime Minister Boris Johnson as being "unfit for office" following revelations about parties at Downing Street.
- Data shows that a growing number of learner-drivers are waiting up to ten months for a test, while some face an eight-hour round trip to a test centre because of staff shortages resulting from COVID.

==== 23 January ====
- Deputy Prime Minister Dominic Raab plays down suggestions the deadline for compulsory vaccination for NHS workers could be extended.
- After Ocado, Next and Ikea reveal that they are only paying the minimum sick pay for unvaccinated employees who are absent due to COVID-related reasons, John Lewis says that it is paying its staff the same rate, regardless of vaccination status, and that it would not be "right" to differentiate.
- Scottish First Minister Nicola Sturgeon tells the BBC's Sunday Morning programme that although she understands the "very adverse" effect Scotland's COVID measures have had on businesses and hospitality, she believes they have been "worth it".
- Welsh First Minister Mark Drakeford says he would "not rule out" recruiting NHS staff from England who lose their jobs because they have not received the vaccine.

==== 24 January ====
- ITV News alleges that up to 30 people, including Prime Minister Boris Johnson's then-fiancée Carrie Symonds, gathered in the Cabinet Room for a surprise get-together for Johnson's birthday on 19 June 2020, while England was still subject to lockdown rules. Downing Street says Johnson attended for less than 10 minutes. In the evening, Johnson celebrated outside with family, as allowed under the then rules. However, ITV News further alleges family friends then went up to Johnson's flat, something 10 Downing Street has denied.
- The UK and Scottish Governments announce that double vaccinated people arriving in England and Scotland will no longer be required to take COVID tests from 11 February.
- Lord Agnew resigns as a Treasury minister over the UK government's handling of fraudulent COVID business loans.

==== 25 January ====
- Metropolitan Police Commissioner Cressida Dick confirms officers have launched an investigation into "potential breaches of Covid-19 regulations" at Downing Street and Westminster since 2020.
- Although it is initially thought any investigation would delay publication of the Gray Report, Sky News reports that the Metropolitan Police do not object to details of the inquiry being released before its investigation, and that Gray is in communication with the police.
- The International Monetary Fund predicts that the UK economy will grow much slower than forecast during 2022.
- Holiday bookings for the forthcoming half-term have risen sharply since it was announced COVID tests for fully vaccinated people arriving back into the UK are to be scrapped, with Jet2 reporting a 30% increase in bookings.
- Health Secretary Sajid Javid says that 77,000 NHS staff remain unvaccinated, and that plans to introduce compulsory vaccination for NHS staff are being "kept under review".
- Scotland confirms its remote work advice will be scrapped in favour of a "hybrid" system involving office and remote work from Monday 31 January.
- Figures show that around one million children were absent from school in England on Thursday 20 January for COVID-related reasons.
- Northern Ireland follows England and Scotland by announcing that fully vaccinated travellers from abroad will no longer need COVID tests when arriving back in Northern Ireland after 11 February.

==== 26 January ====
- At Prime Minister's Questions, Boris Johnson faces renewed calls for him to resign, but says he intends to continue in office. He is also urged to publish in full the Gray Report into the Partygate scandal.
- Northern Ireland scraps COVID passports for pubs, bars and restaurants from 12pm, but they continue to be required for nightclubs and large events. Nightclubs can also reopen while indoor standing events can resume.
- The growth in pet ownership during the pandemic has continued, with retailer Pets at Home forecasting record sales and profits.
- One million face masks, described by a confidential government report as counterfeit, were sent out for use in NHS hospitals despite warnings about their authenticity, it has been reported.

==== 27 January ====
- Plan B measures are lifted in England bringing an end to the mask mandate, but a number of retailers, including Sainsbury's, Tesco, John Lewis, Waitrose and Morrisons will continue to encourage people to wear them, along with several rail operators.
- Prime Minister Boris Johnson confirms that the Gray Report will be published in full, but says he does not know when it will be published.
- The Scottish Government has officially rejected suggestion that any social gatherings were held by ministers or civil servants during December 2020. The statement comes in response to a Freedom of Information request from The Scotsman.
- A man is sentenced to eight months in prison after accosting England's chief medical officer, Sir Chris Whitty in London's St James's Park in June 2021.

==== 28 January ====
- There is confusion about when the Gray Report will be published after the Metropolitan Police issues a statement saying it has asked for civil servant Sue Gray to make "minimal reference" in her report to certain events that are under police investigation. But the Met says it has not asked for a delay to the report's publication. BBC News reports that Gray will not wait for the police investigation to conclude before handing her report to Downing Street.
- The UK government announces that the antiviral drug Ritonavir will be made available for the most vulnerable patients who test positive for COVID from Thursday 10 February.
- Amanda Blanc, the chief executive of Aviva, urges companies to ensure the return to working in offices does not "jeopardise" career opportunities for women.
- Rules on physical distancing and the wearing of face masks in certain circumstances are relaxed in Scotland. The changes apply to indoor settings such as religious services where the two metre rule is changed to become a one-metre rule, while adults are no longer required to wear face coverings if taking part in organised activities with children under the age of five.
- Wales cuts the period of self-isolation following a positive COVID test to five full days, bringing it into line with rules in England and Northern Ireland. Other changes include the reopening of nightclubs, an end to the rule of six requirement in pubs and restaurants and the scrapping of social distancing requirements.

==== 29 January ====
- A small study using a xenon gas scanning method has indicate people with Long COVID may have lung damage.
- Senior Conservatives have joined opposition politicians in calling for the Gray Report to be published in full after doubt emerged about how complete the report would be.

==== 30 January ====
- An article in The Sunday Times reports on a freedom of information request that identifies the number of UK COVID deaths where there was no other underlying health condition as 17,000.
- The Mail on Sunday claims that Prime Minister Boris Johnson planned to introduce restrictions preventing people from mixing over Christmas 2021, but was forced to abandon them following objection from three senior cabinet colleagues – Brexit Minister David Frost, Chancellor Rishi Sunak and Commons Leader Jacob Rees-Mogg.

==== 31 January ====
- The initial findings of a report by Sue Gray into Downing Street parties are published. She notes that, "At least some of the gatherings in question represent a serious failure to observe not just the high standards expected of those working at the heart of Government but also of the standards expected of the entire British population at the time," and concludes that "a number of these gatherings should not have been allowed to take place or to develop in the way that they did. There is significant learning to be drawn from these events which must be addressed immediately across Government."
- Following the report's publication, Prime Minister Boris Johnson tells the House of Commons he accepts the findings and will make changes to how 10 Downing Street and the Cabinet Office are run.
- Health Secretary Sajid Javid announces the legal requirement for frontline NHS staff in England to be vaccinated by 1 April will be scrapped, saying the measure is "no longer proportionate".
- Education Secretary Nadhim Zahawi and Foreign Secretary Liz Truss both test positive for COVID.
- Restrictions for care homes in England are relaxed. From this date there is no limit on the number of visitors residents can receive, while the period of self-isolation following a positive COVID test is cut from fourteen to ten days, and the protocol following an outbreak is now required for fourteen rather than twenty-eight days.
- Children in England aged 5–11 and considered to be most at risk from being seriously ill with COVID become eligible for their first vaccine.

=== February 2022 ===
==== 1 February ====
- Following confusion over whether details of any possible fine Prime Minister Boris Johnson may receive because of lockdown breaches would be published, he says that Downing Street will "publish everything that we can".
- The Telegraph alleges Johnson attended a further three parties at 10 Downing Street, including one to celebrate the departure of Dominic Cummings on 13 November 2020 at which a number of ABBA hits were played.
- Accounts show the UK government has written off £8.7bn it spent on protective equipment bought during the pandemic.

==== 2 February ====
- 534 coronavirus-related deaths are reported, the highest daily figure since February 2021.
- Tobias Ellwood, Anthony Mangnall and Sir Gary Streeter become the latest Conservative MPs to publicly state their intention to submit a letter to Sir Graham Brady, chairman of the party's 1922 Committee calling for a vote of no confidence in Prime Minister Boris Johnson following the Partygate scandal. This brings to nine the number of MPs who have publicly declared their intentions to do so.
- BBC News reports on the world's first COVID "challenge trial", a London-based study which saw 36 young, healthy and unvaccinated people deliberately infected with COVID in order to help develop the next generation of vaccines and drugs to treat the virus.
- New data shows shoppers have been hit by the highest price rises in nearly 10 years after shop inflation almost doubled over the past month.

==== 3 February ====
- The Novavax COVID vaccine, which offers up to 89% protection against the virus, is approved for use in the UK, becoming the fifth vaccine to do so.
- Chancellor Rishi Sunak says the Partygate scandal has damaged the public's trust in government, but plays down speculation that he could become prime minister.
- Munira Mirza resigns as Director of the Number 10 Policy Unit, and is then followed by three other senior aides later the same day – Director of Communications Jack Doyle, Chief of Staff Dan Rosenfield, and Principal Private Secretary to the Prime Minister Martin Reynolds.

==== 4 February ====
- Policy adviser Elena Narozanski becomes the fifth of Johnson's aides to resign within 24 hours.
- Aaron Bell becomes the latest Conservative MP to submit a letter to Sir Graham Brady, chairman of the 1922 Committee, calling for a vote of no confidence in Johnson.
- Media reports allege that the Metropolitan Police have a photograph of Boris Johnson with a can of beer at a lockdown party in June 2020.
- Unions express their anger after Andrew Bailey, Governor of the Bank of England, receives a substantial pay rise, then warns people not to ask for big pay rises, describing it as "outrageous".

==== 5 February ====
- Nick Gibb becomes the latest Conservative MP to submit a letter of no confidence in Boris Johnson's leadership.
- Cabinet Office minister Steve Barclay is appointed as the prime minister's new chief of staff, while former BBC journalist Guto Harri becomes Downing Street's director of communications.
- Speaking about the Partygate scandal, Caroline Slocock, who became the first female private secretary at 10 Downing Street and served under Margaret Thatcher and John Major, says such events would have been "unthinkable" under both former prime ministers.

==== 6 February ====
- The Sunday Times reports that Boris Johnson's team believe 35 letters calling for a no confidence vote have been submitted by Conservative MPs to Sir Graham Brady.
- The news comes as Sir Charles Walker says it is now "inevitable" that Johnson will be forced from office.

==== 7 February ====
- Prime Minister Boris Johnson announces what he describes as "tough targets" to reduce the record NHS waiting lists in England.
- Two people are arrested after Labour leader Sir Keir Starmer was surrounded by a mob of protesters near Parliament, who criticised his record on COVID, called him a traitor and repeated comments made by Johnson at the previous week's Prime Minister's Questions that Starmer had failed to prosecute Jimmy Savile during his time as Director of Public Prosecutions.
- GCSE and A Level grades in 2022 are to be graded more generously than in pre-pandemic years.
- NHS Grampian confirms that 42 people were mistakenly given out-of-date doses of a vaccine at a vaccination centre, but say the vaccine is safe and should still offer some protection.
- Northern Ireland's Health Minister, Robin Swann, has said he is taking legal advice on how he can "replace the bulk of remaining Covid-19 restrictions", with a view to doing so "this week".

==== 8 February ====
- Health Secretary Sajid Javid announces plans to help reduce NHS waiting lists in England, but warns numbers will not begin to fall until 2024, and are likely to increase in the short term.
- Prime Minister Boris Johnson carries out a minor cabinet reshuffle in order to "rejuvenate" his government.
- ScotRail announces that 150 daily services will be re-added to the timetable from the end of May, but that peak-time services will not return to pre-pandemic levels.

==== 9 February ====
- Prime Minister Boris Johnson tells MPs he hopes to bring all of England's domestic COVID rules to an end, including the requirement for those testing positive to self-isolate, later in the month providing the positive trend in the data continues. The measures are currently due to expire on 24 March.
- In contrast, the Scottish Government announces plans to extend its COVID powers by another six months, with legislation covering mask mandates and COVID passports to be extended from 28 February to 24 September.
- Another new photo of Johnson is leaked, this time appearing to show him next to a bottle of champagne, with a tinsel-wearing official and other staff members, apparently taken on 15 December 2020.
- Following reports of the latest picture the Metropolitan Police announces a review of its decision not to investigate the 15 December gathering.
- Officers working on Operation Hillman, the investigation into 12 gatherings at Downing Street, announce that 50 members of Downing Street staff will be sent a questionnaire in which they will be asked to provide an account of the events.

==== 10 February ====
- COVID restrictions, notably the requirement to self isolate after testing positive for COVID, are set to end in England on 24 February 2022. Evidence is not clear whether scientific advice was given for this. It is recommended that people with COVID should not go to work. It is unclear if vulnerable groups with compromised immune systems can resume normal lives. It is further unclear if vulnerable groups will be able to access fourth vaccines or anti-viral drugs.
- Prince Charles has tested positive for COVID, the second time he has done so. It is further reported that he met with the Queen at Windsor Castle two days earlier, but that she is not showing any symptoms.
- Former Prime Minister Sir John Major says that Boris Johnson and Downing Street officials "broke lockdown laws" over parties held in the property and accuses the government of feeling it "need not obey the rules".
- Data from NHS England shows that of the 122,000 A&E patients seen in January, a third of those ill enough to require treatment on a ward waited over four hours.

==== 11 February ====
- Official figures show the UK economy experienced 7.5% recovery during 2021, but fell back in December because of concern about the Omicron variant.
- Spanish tourism minister Fernando Valdés confirms that unvaccinated British teenagers will be allowed to enter Spain provided they give a negative PCR test from Monday 14 February.
- Prime Minister Boris Johnson is sent a questionnaire as part of the Metropolitan Police's Operation Hillman investigation into parties at Downing Street. The investigation is unaffected by the previous day's resignation of Cressida Dick as the Met's Commissioner.

==== 12 February ====
- France announces that fully vaccinated travellers from the United Kingdom are no longer required to take a pre-departure COVID test.

==== 13 February ====
- Scotland's Health Secretary, Humza Yousaf, warns that plans to lift COVID rules in England should not "force the hand" of the Scottish Government in doing the same.
- Chris Hopson, chief executive of NHS Providers, describes UK government plans to reach 130% of pre-COVID elective activity levels in England by 2024–25 as "very stretching", and warns they may not be enough to prevent the number of people on waiting lists from growing.

==== 14 February ====
- An investigation by The Times reveals that YouTube is making money from conspiracy videos, including those providing COVID-19 misinformation, by using an algorithm that shows commercials whenever they are viewed.
- The Covid-19 Bereaved Families for Justice group (representing over 6,000 families) want Boris Johnson to give up control over issues the pandemic public inquiry will investigate. They maintain Johnson is not impartial because police are investigating what Johnson did at 10 Downing Street. The present arrangement gives Johnson the last say on inquiry topics, which could enable him to prevent full investigation of what Johnson and senior officials did.
- The Duchess of Cornwall tests positive for COVID and begins self-isolating.
- The UK government suggests medical face masks could be turned into curtains or bedsheets as a way of tackling pandemic-related PPE plastic waste.
- Northern Ireland's Health Minister, Robin Swann, announces that all remaining COVID regulations in Northern Ireland will be lifted from the following day and replaced with guidelines.

==== 15 February ====
- The latest death figures from the Office for National Statistics show a fall in the number of COVID-related deaths in the week ending 4 February; of the 13,472 deaths registered in that week, 1,390 involved COVID, a fall of 155 on the previous week.
- Wales becomes the first of the UK's constituent countries to announce plans to offer COVID vaccinations to children aged between five and eleven.
- The High Court of England and Wales rules that former Health Secretary Matt Hancock failed to comply with equality legislation when hiring then-chair of NHS Improvement Dido Harding and former Sainsbury's CEO Mike Coupe as part of the UK government's response to COVID-19.
- All COVID regulations are lifted in Northern Ireland.

==== 16 February ====
- Scotland becomes the UK's second constituent country to announce plans to offer COVID vaccines to children aged five to eleven following advice to the Scottish Government from scientists. But the announcement comes before the Joint Committee on Vaccination and Immunisation has made a decision on its recommendations for that age group. England and Northern Ireland subsequently announce children from that age group will be offered vaccines.
- The number of patients in hospital with COVID-19 in England falls below 10,000 for the first time since December, with figures showing 9,804 on 16 February, the lowest number since 28 December 2021.

==== 17 February ====
- Health data from Wales shows there were 683,331 people waiting for non-urgent surgery in December 2021, a record number and the 20th consecutive month where records have been broken.
- After a UK minister says the "direction of travel" is to end free lateral flow tests, Wales's Health Minister Eluned Morgan says that "England alone" cannot make such a decision.
- The Welsh Government announces the scrapping of COVID passes for large events in Wales, and venues such as nightclubs and cinemas, from the following day.

==== 18 February ====
- Prime Minister Boris Johnson is reported to have returned the questionnaire about allegations of parties during lockdown to police officers investigating the matter.
- The High Court of England and Wales rejects a claim of discrimination against the UK government by four claimants of "legacy benefits" who were not eligible for the £20 increase in Universal Credit during the pandemic.

==== 19 February ====
- Downing Street confirms that all remaining COVID regulations for England are set to end in the coming days, including the legal requirement to self-isolate if symptomatic following a positive test.
- Data produced by accountancy firm PricewaterhouseCoopers indicates more than 17,000 chain store outlets closed during 2021 due to an increase in online retail spurred on by the pandemic, but closures are beginning to slow as independent retailers take on space vacated by the major outlets.

==== 20 February ====
- As England prepares to lift all COVID measures, Prime Minister Johnson says people should not throw caution to the wind.
- During an appearance on BBC One's Sunday Morning, Johnson refuses to say whether he would resign if found by police to have broken COVID laws.
- Buckingham Palace confirms that the Queen has tested positive for COVID and is experiencing mild symptoms, but that she expects to continue with "light duties" at Windsor Castle.

==== 21 February ====
- Prime Minister Boris Johnson confirms that all COVID measures in England will be lifted from Thursday 24 February. This includes the legal requirement to self-isolate and the £500 isolation payment for people on low incomes who are required to self-isolate, but COVID provisions for statutory sick pay will continue for a further month. Johnson also confirms that mass free lateral flow testing will stop on 1 April, after which it will be targeted at certain sections of society.
- The Joint Committee on Vaccination and Immunisation recommends adults over the age of 75, residents in a care home with older people, and those aged over 12 who are immunosuppressant should receive a second booster vaccine in the spring, with either the Moderna vaccine or Pfizer vaccine offered to adults and those aged 12–18 offered the Pfizer vaccine.

==== 22 February ====
- Scotland's First Minister, Nicola Sturgeon, announces that all COVID legal measures in Scotland, including the wearing of face coverings, will be lifted on 21 March.
- Health Secretary Sajid Javid defends plans to lift COVID measures in England, saying the time is right to do so.
- The Queen cancels her virtual engagements for the day as Royal officials confirm she is still suffering mild, cold-like COVID symptoms.

==== 23 February ====
- Boots begins selling single lateral flow tests for £5.99 through its online store, while a pack of four tests can be purchased for £17. Superdrug has them on sale for £1.99.
- While free mass testing for COVID is to end on 1 April in England, Scotland's deputy first minister John Swinney says it will continue in some form in Scotland beyond then.
- Passenger numbers at Heathrow Airport during 2021 fell to 19.4 million, down from 22 million in 2020 and the lowest since 1972, with the numbers not expected to return to pre-pandemic levels until at least 2025.

==== 24 February ====
- All legal COVID restrictions are officially lifted in England.
- The Queen suspends her virtual engagements for the second time in a week following a positive COVID test.

==== 25 February ====
- The UK government agrees to extend the financial bailout for Transport for London implemented during the pandemic until the end of June while they work out a deal to secure long-term funding.

==== 26 February ====
- A Telegraph article reports that COVID modelling published in March 2020 that prompted the first lockdown in the UK was based on inaccurate data.
- A BBC News article reports on the five things that need to be monitored now that COVID rules have ended in England, listing them as new variants, waning immunity, Antiviral drug resistance, how close to normality the country can return, and Long COVID.
- Following advice from the Foreign Office, the Queen cancels a diplomatic reception at Buckingham Palace scheduled for 2 March, which would have been her first public engagement since testing positive for COVID.

==== 27 February ====
- Data shows that COVID deaths in England have been at least 30% higher in deprived areas since the start of 2022.

==== 28 February ====
- Some rail services cut by Avanti West Coast, East Midlands Railway and Southeastern during December and January because of staff shortages caused by Omicron are restored. For example, the volume of services between London Euston and Manchester and Birmingham is doubled by Avanti.
- Changes to COVID regulations in Wales mean that facemasks are no longer required in classrooms and venues such as museums and cinemas, but they continue to be a legal requirement in shops, salons, hairdressers, health and social care settings, as well as on public transport.
- Changes also take effect in Scotland, where schoolchildren are no longer required to wear facemasks in class, but must continue to do so in corridors, and the requirement for large venues to implement COVID passports also ends.

=== March 2022 ===
- 1 March –
  - The UK government confirms the lifting of compulsory vaccines for care home workers in England from 15 March.
  - Buckingham Palace confirms the Queen has returned to work and carried out two virtual engagements.
- 2 March –
  - Jet2 becomes the first carrier to end the requirement for facemasks to be worn on its flights. Ryanair boss Michael O'Leary subsequently says he would like to see them end on Ryanair flights by the spring.
  - BBC News online reports on the phenomenon of "pandemic brain", a condition that sees people experiencing memory loss, fatigue and lack of concentration because of disruption to routine and uncertainty.
- 4 March – The Welsh Government confirms plans to phase out free mass testing for COVID in Wales from the end of March, and gives a provisional date of 28 March for all regulations to be lifted.
- 7 March –
  - A study published in Nature magazine suggests there may be changes to the brain following a COVID infection, notably that a slight shrink in overall size following infection. The study compared MRI imaging before and after infection.
  - Scotland begins offering a second COVID booster vaccine to older care home residents, people aged over 75, and those over 12 who have a suppressed immune system.
- 8 March – It is reported the UK government plans to burn around £8.7bn of unusable personal protective equipment bought at the beginning of the pandemic.
- 10 March –
  - The draft terms of the inquiry into the UK government's handling of the COVID-19 pandemic are published.
  - Douglas Ross, leader of the Scottish Conservatives, withdraws his call for Boris Johnson to resign as prime minister over the Partygate affair, saying it is important to get behind the UK government while there is war in Europe.
- 11 March –
  - A report published by the House of Commons Education Select Committee highlights the "devastating" impact of England's school closures during the pandemic, which it says is leading to greater inequality, with Yorkshire and the Humber and the North East of England the most seriously affected areas.
  - The most recent figures from the Office for National Statistics suggest COVID cases are increasing again, with one in 25 thought to have the infection.
  - Baroness Hallett, chair of the COVID inquiry, confirms that public hearings will not begin until 2023, while her team will spend the time before that gathering evidence in preparation for then.
- 13 March –
  - The 75th British Academy Film Awards are held in London, their first fully in person ceremony to take place since 2020.
  - The UK government plan to cut funding for monitoring COVID has been widely criticised by scientists as shortsighted. The React study, randomly testing roughly 150,000 people in England monthly will end at the end of March, The Zoe covid symptom study will also lose funding, health workers and care homes workers will no longer be monitored and mass free testing will end on 1 April. Scientists maintain without data the government will not know if testing should restart. The disruption when COVID develops without testing will, according to scientists probably cost more than the money saved by ending testing.
- 14 March –
  - Transport Secretary Grant Shapps confirms all remaining COVID travel rules will end from 4am on 18 March.
  - COVID cases are increasing across the UK and Sajid Javid expects cases to increase further since restrictions have ended. People are urged to get vaccination and get booster shots.
- 15 March –
  - Scotland's rules requiring the wearing of facemasks in shops and on public transport are extended until 4 April against the backdrop of rising COVID cases, but all other requirements on businesses are to change from legal to advisory from 21 March.
  - COVID cases are rising throughout the UK notably among older age groups. Many older people had their booster dose of vaccine some time ago and their immunity is waning. The Omicron BA.2 variant is driving the increase in infections. Professor James Naismith of the Rosalind Franklin Institute at the University of Oxford said, "For the UK, my main concern is for the vulnerable, for whom this disease is serious and for those whose lives will be blighted by long Covid. Every effort must be made to triple-vaccinate as many people as possible, quadruple-vaccinate the most vulnerable and make available antivirals."
- 17 March – Data from the Association of Leading Visitor Attractions (Alva) shows the number of visitors in 2021 increased 25% in comparison to 2020, but was still 57% lower than in 2019.
- 18 March –
  - Data from the Office for National Statistics suggests that COVID-19 cases have continued to rise in the UK, with an estimated one in 20 people infected. The number is believed to be one in 14 in Scotland, and one in 25 in Wales.
  - All COVID travel restrictions are lifted for travellers entering the UK.
- 21 March –
  - NHS England launches its Spring Booster Programme, offering a booster vaccine to 600,000 people aged over 75, who are residents in a care home, and those aged over 12 considered to be medically vulnerable.
  - Officers from the Metropolitan Police who are investigating the Partygate affair have sent out 100 questionnaires so far.
- 24 March –
  - The Welsh Government confirms plans to proceed with the scrapping of some COVID regulations in Wales from Monday 28 March despite an increase in case numbers. From that date face coverings will no longer be a legal requirement in shops and on public transport, but will continue to be required in health and care settings. Companies will also need to continue making workplace risk assessments. All rules were scheduled to expire on 28 March, but the remaining measures have been extended for three weeks, with a review planned for 14 April.
  - Overnight programming on BBC Radio 5 Live is temporarily suspended due to Covid-related staff shortages at the station's MediaCityUK studios. The station will instead simulcast the BBC World Service between 01:00 and 05:00 daily until at least 4 April.
  - Northern Ireland's Health Minister, Robin Swann, confirms that most people in Northern Ireland will no longer be eligible for free COVID testing from 22 April, although lateral flow tests will continue to be free for people displaying symptoms. Swann also confirms that routine contract tracing is to be phased out in Northern Ireland between mid-April and June.
- 25 March – Figures from the Office for National Statistics suggest 4.3 million people were infected with COVID in the week ending 19 March, an increase of 30% from 3.3 million the previous week.
- 28 March –
  - The Guardian publishes an article in which scientists warn that ending free COVID testing will mean people will not know if they are infected, will go to public places with the virus and will pass the virus on, something that will be exacerbated in deprived communities. Professor Azra Ghani of Imperial College London says that most at-risk patients may not get rapid intervention they need, while GP surgeries could become high risk venues for infection. Ending free testing could also delay finding out about new variants with possible worldwide implications, the article says.
  - The BBC reports that the Metropolitan Police are poised to begin issuing fines for breaches of COVID regulations made by those involved in the Partygate affair, with as many as fifteen fines issued initially.
  - The planned lifting of COVID measures announced for Wales goes ahead.
- 29 March –
  - The Metropolitan Police say that 20 fixed penalty notices have been issued for alleged breaches of lockdown rules relating to the Partygate affair, and confirm they will not identify those who have been issued with the notices.
  - The UK government publishes the list of those in England who will still be eligible for free lateral flow tests from 1 April. They are as follows:
    - NHS staff
    - Patients in hospital, where a PCR test is required for their care
    - People who are eligible for community COVID drug treatments because they are at higher risk of getting seriously ill
    - Care home residents
    - People working in some high-risk settings, including care homes and prisons
- 30 March – Scottish First Minister Nicola Sturgeon confirms that rules regarding face coverings in shops and on public transport in Scotland will remain in place until 18 April.

=== April 2022 ===
- 1 April – The latest figures from the Office for National Statistics indicate that 4.9 million people in the UK had COVID in the week ending 26 March, meaning that every one person in 13 had the virus. This is the highest recorded number of cases since records began in April 2020.
- 2 April – Low-dose vaccines for COVID-19 become available for children aged five to 11 in England, with five million eligible. A second dose is recommended after 12 weeks.
- 4 April –
  - EasyJet have cancelled around 100 flights, including 62 from UK airports, due to high levels of staff absences from COVID-19.
  - Rules requiring people to wear face coverings in places of worship, and at weddings and funerals, come to an end in Scotland.
  - The UK government adds a further nine symptoms to the list of COVID symptoms. These are: Shortness of breath, feeling tired or exhausted, an aching body, a headache, a sore throat, a blocked or runny nose, loss of appetite, diarrhoea, feeling sick or being sick. The original recognised symptoms were fever, new continuous cough, and loss of sense of smell or taste.
  - Helen MacNamara, a former civil servant who was in charge of ethics at the Cabinet Office, is named as one of the recipients of a fixed penalty notice in relation to the Partygate affair. She apologises for her actions, describing them as an "error of judgement".
- 5 April –
  - The Health and Social Care Committee warns that staff shortages and disruption from the pandemic are causing delays for early cancer diagnosis.
  - A further 60 EasyJet flights are cancelled as the company continues to be impacted by staff absences through COVID, with the disruption expected to continue into coming days.
  - Figures released by the UK government show the number of absences from school in England because of COVID are stabilising, with 179,000 pupils (about 2.2%) absent on 31 March, down from 202,000 (about 2.5%) in mid-March.
- 6 April –
  - The UK Health Security Agency confirms it has identified another COVID variant, Omicron XE, which has been found in 637 cases so far.
  - The final REACT study is published by Imperial College London, as the government withdraws funding as part of its "Living with Covid" strategy.
- 7 April – Hospitals in England are under "enormous strain", with some so busy they are having to divert ambulances to other sites; 20 hospitals have issued such instructions in the past week.
- 8 April –
  - Figures produced by the Office for National Statistics estimate the number of COVID infections in the UK for the week ending 2 April to be around 25,000 lower than the previous week.
  - People hoping to travel abroad for the Easter holidays face huge disruption as airlines struggle to deal with the number of customers because of COVID staff absences.
- 10 April – News emerges of a virtual hospital tour made by the Queen the previous week during which she described how she was left feeling "very tired and exhausted" after catching COVID.
- 12 April – Prime Minister Boris Johnson, his wife, Carrie, and Chancellor Rishi Sunak are among the latest raft of people to be fined by the Metropolitan Police for breaking the law over the Partygate affair. Johnson's fine makes him the UK's first serving prime minister to be sanctioned for breaking the law.
- 13 April –
  - Johnson and Sunak have rejected calls for them to resign in the wake of their Partygate fines.
  - Lord David Wolfson resigns as justice minister in protest at the Partygate affair.
  - The Scottish Government confirms that the law requiring the wearing of face coverings in many indoor settings will end from Monday 18 April, although people will continue to be strongly advised to wear them in crowded indoor spaces.
  - The law requiring workplaces in Wales to take COVID-safe precautions is to be lifted from Monday 18 April, the Welsh Government confirms.
- 14 April –
  - Figures released by the Office for National Statistics indicate 4.4 million people in the UK were infected with COVID in the week ending 9 April, a fall from the previous week's 4.9 million.
  - Valneva is approved as the UK's sixth vaccine.
  - The Moderna vaccine is approved for use in 6 to 11-year olds.
- 17 April – Leading historian Peter Hennessy describes Prime Minister Johnson's fine for breaching lockdown rules as the "most severe constitutional crisis involving a prime minister".
- 18 April – Scotland's rules regarding the wearing of face coverings in shops and restaurants, and on public transport, are lifted.
- 19 April –
  - In a statement to the House of Commons, Prime Minister Johnson apologises following his receipt of a fine for breaching lockdown rules, and says that he did not realise he had breached rules at the time.
  - Patients waiting in NHS hospitals, GP surgeries and emergency departments in England are no longer required to socially distance.
- 21 April –
  - MPs approve an investigation by the House of Commons Privileges Select Committee into claims Prime Minister Boris Johnson misled Parliament over the Partygate affair.
  - The Metropolitan Police says it will not give any further updates on its Partygate investigation until after the local elections on 5 May.
  - Market research carried out by Kantar suggests that lockdown has led to women using fewer cosmetics.
- 22 April –
  - Figures released from the Office for National Statistics for the week ending 16 April indicate the number of people in the UK infected with COVID-19 continues to fall, with 3.76 million having the virus during that week, roughly one in 17.
  - Figures from the Office for National Statistics indicate the number of COVID-related deaths in Wales has passed 10.000, with 10,019 deaths recorded as of the week up to 8 April.
  - Free universal PCR tests come to an end in Northern Ireland.
- 23 April – Downing Street confirms that the Prime Minister has not received any further fines connected with the Partygate affair.
- 24 April – As the Prime Minister comes under increasing pressure from MPs over the Partygate affair, Conservative Party chairman Oliver Dowden warns that removing Boris Johnson from office would lead to "instability and uncertainty" in the country. Cabinet Minister Jacob Rees-Mogg says he does not believe the public are "losing faith" in Johnson.
- 26 April –
  - A Cardiff University study of hospital admissions in England and Wales indicates serious violence increased by 23% after lockdown restrictions were eased in 2021, but remained below pre-pandemic levels.
  - Scientists are exploring possible links between the pandemic and rare cases of child hepatitis after 114 children in the UK become ill, 10 of who needed a liver transplant.
- 27 April –
  - The High Court of England and Wales rules that the UK government's policies on discharging untested patients from hospital to care homes in England at the start of the pandemic was unlawful because they failed to take into account the potential risk of COVID-19 to elderly and vulnerable people.
  - It is confirmed the Royal Edinburgh Military Tattoo will return in August, the first time the event has been staged since 2019.
- 29 April –
  - The latest Office for National Statistics figures show a record drop in the number of COVID-19 infections, with 2.87 million people estimated to have the virus in the week to 23 April – 900,000 fewer than the week before.
  - The Labour Party confirms that its deputy leader, Angela Rayner, was at an event where leader Sir Keir Starmer was filmed drinking beer during lockdown in 2021.
- 30 April –
  - Health agencies have dismissed social media claims linking COVID-19 vaccines to a recent spike of cases of hepatitis in children, pointing out that those affected were under the age at which they would have been given the vaccine.
  - Lichfield MP Michael Fabricant has written a letter of apology to the National Association of Headteachers after suggesting teachers and nurses enjoyed a "quiet drink" in staff rooms during lockdown, while defending Prime Minister Boris Johnson over the Partygate affair.

=== May 2022 ===
- 1 May – Self-isolation guidance for people testing positive for COVID in Scotland comes to an end and is replaced by "stay at home" advice for those who are unwell.
- 3 May – Sir Keir Starmer accuses the Conservative Party of "mud-slinging" after some of its MPs suggest he may have broken COVID rules over the Beergate affair.
- 6 May – Durham Police launch an investigation into whether Sir Keir Starmer broke lockdown rules after he drank beer at an MP's constituency office during a visit to the area in 2021.
- 8 May – Deputy Prime Minister Dominic Raab accuses Labour Party leader Sir Keir Starmer of "hypocrisy" after police launch an investigation into whether he breached COVID rules in 2021.
- 9 May –
  - Beergate: Sir Keir Starmer says he will resign as leader of the Labour Party if he is given a fine by Durham Police for breaching COVID rules.
  - Face masks are no longer required to be worn in schools in Wales.
- 12 May – Partygate: Police issue another 50 fixed penalty notices for breaches of COVID-19 rules in Downing Street and other government buildings.
- 13 May – The exam watchdog Qualifications Wales confirms that pupils in Wales will continue to receive advance notice of exam content during the 2022–23 academic year.
- 18 May – England's former deputy chief medical officer, Professor Sir Jonathan Van-Tam, has missed the ceremony at which his knighthood was due to be given after becoming infected with COVID-19.
- 19 May –
  - The Joint Committee on Vaccination and Immunisation recommends adults over the age of 65, frontline health workers and people aged 16–64 who are classed as vulnerable should receive a COVID booster vaccine in the autumn.
  - Partygate: Downing Street confirms Prime Minister Johnson will not receive any further fines after police conclude their investigation into the Partygate affair; the Metropolitan Police have issued a total of 126 fines to 83 people for events happening across eight different dates.
  - As of midday the daily reporting of COVID statistics in Wales comes to an end, with figures reported weekly from now on.
- 20 May –
  - The UK's COVID Alert Level is downgraded from four to three, but two new variants of the Omicron virus, BA.4 and BA.5, are reclassified as variants of concern, although there is no evidence they cause any new or more serious symptoms.
  - Figures from the Office for National Statistics estimate that one in 50 people (or around 1.27 million) had coronavirus in the week ending 13 May, a fall of 14% from the previous week.
  - Partygate: With the police investigation now concluded, civil servant Sue Gray is free to publish her report, and it is reported she plans to name some of the senior officials who breached regulations.
  - Scotland's First Minister, Nicola Sturgeon, tests positive for COVID-19 after experiencing mild symptoms. The positive test comes shortly after she held talks with Sinn Féin vice president Michelle O'Neill at her official residence in Edinburgh.
  - Northern Ireland's Department of Health publishes its final set of daily COVID statistics after two years of doing so. 262 positive cases are recorded and no deaths.
- 21 May –
  - The Spanish government confirms that unvaccinated travellers from countries outside the EU, including the UK, can enter the country by providing a negative PCR or antigen test.
  - Partygate: Opposition parties are calling for Prime Minister Johnson to explain a meeting he had with Sue Gray over her report into the scandal.
- 22 May – Partygate: The deadline for Downing Street officials to object to being named in Sue Gray's Report expires.
- 23 May – Partygate: ITV News publishes four photographs taken of Prime Minister Boris Johnson drinking at a Downing Street party on 13 November 2020. Downing Street responds by stating that the police had access to the photographs, taken at the leaving party for Director of Communications Lee Cain.
- 24 May –
  - Partygate: Staff who attended events at Downing Street during lockdown tell the BBC's Panorama programme that people crowded together, sat on each other's laps and mocked those anxious about COVID-19. The programme also alleges that Johnson asked Sue Gray to scrap her report, although this is denied by Downing Street.
  - Partygate: Mayor of London Sadiq Khan says he has asked the Metropolitan Police for a "detailed explanation" of its decision-making process over who should be fined during its investigation.
- 25 May –
  - Partygate: The full version of the Gray Report is published. In the 37-page document, Sue Gray concludes that senior Downing Street officials, both political and non-political, "bear responsibility" for the culture prevailing during COVID lockdowns, adding "It is my firm belief, however, that these events did not reflect the prevailing culture in Government and the Civil Service at the time".
  - Partygate: Johnson addresses the House of Commons, telling MPs he takes "full responsibility for everything that took place on my watch", and has been "humbled" and learned lessons.
- 26 May –
  - Partygate: Acting Metropolitan Police Commissioner Sir Stephen House says there is "no clear evidence" Johnson had breached COVID rules many times in Downing Street.
  - Partygate: Four Conservative MPs – John Baron, David Simmonds, Stephen Hammond and Julian Sturdy – have called for Boris Johnson to resign as Prime Minister since the publication of the Gray Report.
- 27 May –
  - The latest Office for National Statistics figures, for the week ending 21 May, indicate around one million people in the UK (or one in 60) had the COVID-19 virus. Cases have declined again in England, Wales and Northern Ireland, but remain relatively unchanged in Scotland.
  - Partygate: Conservative MP Paul Holmes resigns from his junior ministerial position at the Home Office over the findings of the Gray Report. Five MPs, including former minister Sir Bob Neill, have also called for Johnson to resign since the report was published.
- 29 May – Partygate: A further two Conservative MPs – Former health minister Steve Brine and Newton Abbot MP Anne Marie Morris – confirm they have submitted letters of no confidence in Johnson, while Elliot Colburn is the latest Conservative to submit a letter of no confidence.
- 30 May –
  - Partygate: Former Attorney General Jeremy Wright becomes the latest Conservative MP to call for the resignation of Boris Johnson as Prime Minister, while backbench MPs Elliot Colburn and Andrew Bridgen become the latest Conservatives to submit letters of no confidence in the Prime Minister.
  - The wearing of face coverings in health and social care settings in Wales is no longer a legal requirement, thus ending the last of Wales's COVID regulations.
  - Archbishop of Canterbury Justin Welby confirms he will not be attending the Platinum Jubilee National Service of Thanksgiving on 3 June due to a positive COVID-19 test. His place will be taken by Archbishop of York Stephen Cottrell.
  - Sir Van Morrison launches legal action against Northern Ireland's Department of Health and Health Minister Robin Swann over an op-ed piece that appeared in Rollins Stone magazine in September 2020 that criticised Morrison's stance on COVID-19 restrictions.
  - A report compiled by Wales's Auditor General, Adrian Compton, estimates it could take as long as seven years to get hospital waiting lists in Wales back to pre-COVID levels.
- 31 May –
  - Partygate: John Stevenson becomes the latest Conservative MP to write a letter of no confidence in Boris Johnson. The Prime Minister is also criticised by Dame Andrea Leadsom, although she stops short of calling for his resignation.
  - Partygate: Lord Geidt, the Independent Adviser on Ministers' Interests, says there is a "legitimate question" over whether Johnson broke the ministerial code after being fined over the Partygate affair.
  - Beergate: It is confirmed that Labour Party leader Sir Keir Starmer and his deputy, Angela Rayner, have received questionnaires from Durham Constabulary as part of their investigation into the gathering both politicians attended on 30 April 2021.

=== June 2022 ===
- 1 June –
  - Recent disruption at airports continues to affect holidaymakers, with many flights being cancelled. The cause is attributed to staff shortages, as the industry struggles to recruit replacements for the workers laid off during the COVID-19 pandemic.
  - The Office for National Statistics (ONS) reports that the number of people suffering from Long COVID now exceeds 2 million, or about 3% of the UK population.
  - A chronic backlog of driving tests has built up because of the pandemic, with learner drivers reporting they are having to pay up to twice the usual cost for a test as tests are block-booked and resold for profit. The Driving and Vehicles Standards Agency (DVSA) confirms the next day that it is closing down accounts not associated with driving instructors to end the practice of reselling the tests.
- 2 June – The Duke of York has tested positive for COVID-19 and will therefore not be present at the Platinum Jubilee National Service of Thanksgiving at St Paul's Cathedral the following day.
- 6 June – Sir Graham Brady, Chairman of the 1922 committee of the Conservative Party, announces a vote of confidence in Boris Johnson's leadership of the party. A secret ballot is held from 6-8pm. The party's MPs decide that they do have confidence in Johnson's leadership, returning a vote of 211 to 148.
- 10 June – The latest Office for National Statistics figures indicate a small rise in the number of COVID-19 cases in England and Northern Ireland, something that is believed to be being driven by the BA.4 and BA.5 strains of the Omicron variant. Statistics for Scotland show an increase in cases from one in 50 to one in 40 over a week.
- 13 June – Figures released by the ONS show the economy contracted by 0.3% in April, prompting concerns that the UK is going into recession. The ONS says that the fall was driven by all main parts of the economy but accentuated by the effect that the winding down of COVID-19 testing had on the health sector.
- 17 June –
  - The latest Office for National Statistics figures indicate another rise in COVID-19 cases, with the Platinum Jubilee celebrations thought to have contributed to the increase. Figures show 1.4 million people with the virus, or one in 45, a rise from one in 65 the previous week.
  - Beergate: The Labour Party confirms that leader Sir Keir Starmer and his deputy Angela Rayner have returned their questionnaires to Durham Constabulary.
- 21 June – The partner of a former rock star who died eight days after receiving the AstraZeneca vaccine is awarded £120,000 damages, becoming the first person in the UK to receive such a payment.
- 24 June – The latest Office for National Statistics data suggests another rise in the number of people infected with COVID, with 1.7 million people with the virus in the week up to 18 June, roughly one in 38.
- 28 June – COVID-19 in the United Kingdom: A public inquiry begins into the UK's handling of the pandemic.

== See also ==
- Timeline of the COVID-19 pandemic in the United Kingdom (January–June 2020)
- Timeline of the COVID-19 pandemic in the United Kingdom (July–December 2020)
- Timeline of the COVID-19 pandemic in the United Kingdom (January–June 2021)
- Timeline of the COVID-19 pandemic in the United Kingdom (July–December 2021)
- Timeline of the COVID-19 pandemic in the United Kingdom (July–December 2022)
- Timeline of the COVID-19 pandemic in the United Kingdom (2023)
- Timeline of the COVID-19 pandemic in the United Kingdom (2024)
- Timeline of the COVID-19 pandemic in England (2022)
- Timeline of the COVID-19 pandemic in Scotland (2022)
- Timeline of the COVID-19 pandemic in Wales (2022)
- Timeline of the COVID-19 pandemic in Northern Ireland (2022)
- History of the COVID-19 pandemic in the United Kingdom
- COVID-19 vaccination programme in the United Kingdom
