= Timeline of the COVID-19 pandemic in England (2022) =

Daily English events related to the pandemic in 2022

The following is a timeline of the COVID-19 pandemic in England during 2022. There are significant differences in the legislation and the reporting between the countries of the UK: England, Scotland, Northern Ireland, and Wales.

== Timeline ==
=== January 2022 ===
- 1 January –
  - Although official events to celebrate New Year were cancelled in London, crowds gather to welcome in 2022. The fireworks display goes ahead as planned, but people are asked to stay away because of the risk of COVID.
  - Professors Chris Whitty and Jonathan Van-Tam, the respective Chief Medical Officer and Deputy Chief Medical officer for England, are both knighted in the 2022 New Year Honours. Also to be recognised with Honours are Dr Jenny Harries, chief executive of the UK Health Security Agency, and Dr June Raine, chief executive of the vaccines regulator, the Medicines and Healthcare products Regulatory Agency, who are both made dames.
- 2 January –
  - Ministers have said there is nothing in the data to suggest new COVID rules are needed for England. Health Minister Edward Argar urges "cool, calm heads", while Steve Barclay says there have been "significant behaviour change" as a result of Plan B measures.
  - The UK government announces that face masks are to be worn in schools in England when classes resume following the Christmas holiday.
- 3 January –
  - A letter signed by Education Secretary Nadhim Zahawi advises schools in England to prepare for staff absences by merging classes into larger groups, and to consider what it describes as "flexible" teaching options.
  - A major incident is declared at four Lincolnshire hospitals due to staff shortages because of COVID. It is one of six NHS trusts where major incidents have been declared.
  - The Royal College of Nursing urges the UK government to take a more cautious approach as the Omicron variant continues to spread.
  - Figures produced by NHS Digital and obtained by the Press Association show that thousands of people in England required hospital treatment during the lockdowns of 2020 and 2021 after undertaking activities such as DIY, remote work, cookery and dog walking.
- 5 January –
  - As figures suggest one in fifteen people in the UK had COVID on New Year's Eve, Prime Minister Boris Johnson confirms that Plan B measures in England will stay in place for a further three weeks.
  - Rules regarding PCR tests in England are to change from the following week, meaning anyone testing positive for COVID with a lateral flow test but who have no symptoms will no longer need to follow the test with a PCR test; they will still be required to self-isolate for seven days though.
  - At least ten hospital trusts in England have declared critical incidents due to COVID, with Manchester University NHS Foundation Trust being the latest to do so.
- 6 January –
  - On the eve of changes to the rules regarding PCR tests for travellers to and from England, Transport Secretary Grant Shapps describes them as having "outlived [their] usefulness" because Omicron is now "widespread and worldwide".
  - Details of a review used by the UK government to reintroduce face masks in schools for England comes to light in which the evidence of their effectiveness is described as "not conclusive".
  - A total of 356 passengers were handed £200 fines for not wearing face masks between 30 November and 21 December 2021, the Mayor of London confirms.
- 7 January –
  - From 4am people in England who are fully vaccinated are no longer required to take a pre-departure COVID test before travelling abroad, while anyone arriving in England who has had both vaccines is not required to self-isolate while waiting for the results of a PCR test.
  - Around 200 military personnel have been deployed to help short-staffed hospitals and ambulance services in England.
- 11 January –
  - People in England without COVID symptoms no longer need a PCR test to confirm a positive lateral flow test following a change in the rules.
  - Data shows that 6.6% of teachers in England, roughly one in 12, were absent from schools in England during the first week of the winter term.
- 13 January –
  - Health Secretary Sajid Javid confirms the period of self-isolation in England following a positive COVID test is to be cut to five full days from Monday 17 January.
  - The number of people on hospital waiting lists in England reaches six million, with roughly one in 20 waiting for routine operations such as knee surgery for over a year.
  - Almost one in three local authorities in England report they are having to ration care for elderly and disabled people because of Omicron variant-related absences.
- 15 January – The Football Association grants Arsenal permission to postpone a north London derby match with Tottenham scheduled for the following day because Arsenal is unable to field a team due to absences from COVID, suspensions, injuries and players being away at the 2021 Africa Cup of Nations.
- 17 January –
  - Avanti West Coast, c2c, East Midlands Railway and South Western Railway all introduce emergency timetables in order to cope with staff shortages.
  - Train operator Avanti West Coast reduces its services between London Euston and Manchester Piccadilly from three trains per hour to one train per hour in a bid to make the service more reliable while its staff experience a high number of absences due. The revised timetable is scheduled to be in place until 25 February with a weekly review.
- 19 January
  - Prime Minister Boris Johnson announces that the requirements to present COVID passes at certain venues and events and to wear face coverings on public transport and in certain indoor locations, along with the guidance to work remotely, would cease to apply after 26 January.
  - But Mayor of London Sadiq Khan announces that masks will continue to be compulsory on Transport for London services, and urges the UK government to rethink its decision.
  - Self-styled "guerrilla journalist" Debbie Hicks, who took film inside Gloucestershire Royal Hospital in December 2020 in an attempt to prove it was empty and that the COVID pandemic was therefore a hoax, is convicted of a public order offence following a trial at Gloucester Crown Court.
- 20 January – Several large employers, including banks, insurers and advertising companies, say they have made plans for their staff to return to the office following the UK government's decision to end remote work advice in England with immediate effect.
- 21 January – The major incident declared in London in December by Mayor Sadiq Khan as Omicron cases spread in the city has been stood down.
- 22 January – The Royal College of GPs urges the UK government to extend the deadline for NHS staff in England to be vaccinated beyond 9 February in order to prevent a shortage of staff.
- 24 January – The UK and Scottish Governments announce that double vaccinated people arriving in England and Scotland will no longer be required to take COVID tests from 11 February.
- 25 January – Figures show that around one million children were absent from school in England on Thursday 20 January for COVID-related reasons.
- 27 January – Plan B measures are lifted in England bringing an end to the mask mandate, but a number of retailers, including Sainsbury's, Tesco, John Lewis, Waitrose and Morrisons will continue to encourage people to wear them, along with several rail operators.
- 28 January –
  - Some people in England who are at high risk from COVID say they have been left out of plans to give vulnerable patients quick access to treatments.
  - Special walk-in vaccination sessions have been held in Lincolnshire aimed at people with a phobia of needles.
  - A man has been fined £7,000 for repeatedly leaving his room at a quarantine hotel in April 2021 to smoke, even after his wife had tested positive for COVID.
- 31 January –
  - Health Secretary Sajid Javid announces the legal requirement for frontline NHS staff in England to be vaccinated by 1 April will be scrapped, saying the measure is "no longer proportionate".
  - Restrictions for care homes in England are relaxed. From this date there is no limit on the number of visitors residents can receive, while the period of self-isolation following a positive COVID test is cut from fourteen to ten days, and the protocol following an outbreak is now required for fourteen rather than twenty-eight days.
  - Children in England aged 5–11 and considered to be most at risk from being seriously ill with COVID become eligible for their first vaccine.

=== February 2022 ===
- 7 February – Prime Minister Boris Johnson announces what he describes as "tough targets" to reduce the record NHS waiting lists in England.
- 8 February – Health Secretary Sajid Javid announces plans to help reduce NHS waiting lists in England, but warns numbers will not begin to fall until 2024, and are likely to increase in the short term.
- 9 February – Prime Minister Boris Johnson tells MPs he hopes to bring all of England's domestic COVID rules to an end, including the requirement for those testing positive to self-isolate, later in the month providing the positive trend in the data continues. The measures are currently due to expire on 24 March.
- 11 February – Mark Hillary, a prominent financial donor to the University of Durham, withdraws his support over what he calls the university's "ridiculous and ineffective" COVID rules that have left students as the "final members of society" to be subjected to the rules.
- 13 February – Chris Hopson, chief executive of NHS Providers, describes UK government plans to reach 130% of pre-COVID elective activity levels in England by 2024–25 as “very stretching”, and warns they may not be enough to prevent the number of people on waiting lists from growing.
- 15 February – Figures indicate the number of children being home-schooled in England has risen by 34% since the start of the pandemic.
- 16 February –
  - England follows Wales and Scotland in announcing that children aged between five and eleven will be offered a "low dose" COVID vaccine. Health Secretary Sajid Javid says the rollout will be "non-urgent" and based on parental choice.
  - The number of patients in hospital with COVID-19 in England falls below 10,000 for the first time since December, with figures showing 9,804 on 16 February, the lowest number since 28 December 2021.
- 19 February –
  - Figures show that around 50% of people in Newcastle-upon-Tyne have had a booster vaccine, and 75% have had the initial vaccine, prompting local Labour councillor for Blakelaw Oskar Avery to urge the city to "get the momentum back".
  - Downing Street confirms that all remaining COVID regulations for England are set to end in the coming days, including the legal requirement to self-isolate if symptomatic following a positive test.
- 21 February – Prime Minister Boris Johnson confirms that all domestic COVID measures in England will be lifted from Thursday 24 February. This includes the legal requirement to self-isolate and the £500 isolation payment for people on low incomes who are required to self-isolate, but COVID provisions for statutory sick pay will continue for a further month. Johnson also confirms that mass free COVID testing will stop on 1 April, after which it will be targeted at certain sections of society.
- 22 February –
  - Health Secretary Sajid Javid defends plans to lift COVID measures in England, saying the time is right to do so.
  - Headteachers have warned that the "headlong" rush to end COVID measures in schools could lead to a further disruption of children's education.
- 24 February –
  - All domestic legal COVID restrictions are officially lifted in England.
  - The requirement for face masks to be worn on Transport for London services is also removed.

=== March 2022 ===
- 1 March –
  - The UK government confirms the lifting of compulsory vaccines for care home workers in England from 15 March.
  - The Clinical Commissioning Group (CCG) serving Wiltshire, Swindon and Bath has expressed its concern at the low number of five to eleven-year-olds classed as clinically at risk taking up their offer of a COVID vaccine, with 4.7%, or 250 out of 5,300 eligible children having received a vaccine.
- 11 March – A report published by the House of Commons Education Select Committee highlights the "devastating" impact of England's school closures during the pandemic, which it says is leading to greater inequality, with Yorkshire and the Humber and the North East of England the most seriously affected areas.
- 15 March –
  - A study has highlighted what the Royal College of Psychiatrists has described as the unprecedented demand for mental health services, with the number of referrals for specialist NHS mental health care reaching a record high in England by the end of 2021. Figures from NHS Digital indicate some 4.3 million referrals had been made due to mental health issues by the end of that year.
  - The Cheltenham Festival begins, with crowds allowed to attend for the first time since 2020.
- 18 March – The Health Protection (Coronavirus, International Travel and Operator Liability) (England) Regulations 2021, the last coronavirus-related legal restrictions in effect in England, are revoked.
- 21 March – NHS England launches its Spring Booster Programme, offering a booster vaccine to 600,000 people aged over 75, who are residents in a care home, and those aged over 12 considered to be medically vulnerable.
- 21 March –
  - NHS England launches its Spring Booster Programme, offering a booster vaccine to 600,000 people aged over 75, who are residents in a care home, and those aged over 12 considered to be medically vulnerable.
  - England's deputy chief medical officer, Professor Jonathan Van-Tam, is granted the freedom of his home town of Boston, Lincolnshire.
- 29 March – The UK government publishes the list of those in England who will still be eligible for free lateral flow tests from 1 April. They are as follows:
  - NHS staff
  - Patients in hospital, where a PCR test is required for their care
  - People who are eligible for community COVID drug treatments because they are at higher risk of getting seriously ill
  - Care home residents
  - People working in some high-risk settings, including care homes and prisons.
- 31 March – monitoring of wastewater for fragments of the SARS-CoV-2 virus ceases.

=== April 2022 ===
- 2 April – Low-dose vaccines for COVID-19 become available for children aged five to 11 in England, with five million eligible. A second dose is recommended after 12 weeks.
- 5 April – Figures released by the UK government show the number of absences from school in England because of COVID are stabilising, with 179,000 pupils (about 2.2%) absent on 31 March, down from 202,000 (about 2.5%) in mid-March.
- 7 April – Hospitals in England are under "enormous strain", with some so busy they are having to divert ambulances to other sites; 20 hospitals have issued such instructions in the past week.
- 19 April – Patients waiting in NHS hospitals, GP surgeries and emergency departments in England are no longer required to socially distance.
- 27 April – The High Court of England and Wales rules that the UK government's policies on discharging untested patients from hospital to care homes in England at the start of the pandemic was unlawful because they failed to take into account the potential risk of COVID-19 to elderly and vulnerable people.

=== May 2022 ===
- 18 May – England's former deputy chief medical officer, Professor Sir Jonathan Van-Tam, has missed the ceremony at which his knighthood was due to be given after becoming infected with COVID-19.
- 25 May – Figures reveal that almost 4,000 passengers were fined for not wearing face coverings on the London transport network when it was mandatory to do so.
- 28 May – A 20m memorial to people who died from coronavirus is ceremonially burned in an event at the Miners' Welfare Park in Bedworth, Warwickshire, attended by thousands of people. The idea of raising the sculpture, titled Sanctuary, to the ground is an attempt to "help people heal".

=== July 2022 ===
- 15 July – The England women's national football team manager, Sarina Wiegman, has tested positive for COVID-19 shortly before England's Euro 2022 final group game against Northern Ireland.

=== August 2022 ===
- 6 August – Brighton and Hove Pride returns for the first time since the pandemic, having been cancelled in 2020 and 2021.
- 9 August – Figures published by NHS England indicate the number of people in England waiting more than two years for routine surgery has fallen from 22,500 at the start of 2022, to less than 200.
- 12 August – The first annual Boomtown Festival to be held post-pandemic, opens in Hampshire, having been cancelled in 2020 and 2021.
- 14 August – The Crown Prosecution Service confirms that six people who were charged with breaching lockdown rules after attending demonstrations in the wake of the March 2021 murder of Sarah Everard will not be prosecuted.
- 24 August – The UK government announces that most hospital patients and care home residents in England will no longer be required to take COVID-19 tests, although new admissions into both will continue to be tested. Free lateral flow tests for health and social care staff will also end from 31 August.

=== September 2022 ===
- 5 September – The deployment of the Autumn 2022 COVID-19 booster programme begins in England, with care home residents and people who are housebound the first to be offered the vaccine.

=== October 2022 ===
- 13 October –
  - The latest health figures show that hospital waiting lists in England have reached seven million, their highest since records began.
  - A Sheffield woman who held a rave during one of the COVID-19 lockdowns has had her case withdrawn by the Crown Prosecution Service.
- 18 October – NHS England warns that up to half of its hospital beds could be taken up with patients suffering respiratory problems because of a "twindemic" of COVID-19 and flu over the coming winter.

=== November 2022 ===
- 7 November – Analysis by BBC News has indicated a 10% rise in the number of five- and six-year-olds in England requiring speech therapy in the past year, something that experts partially attribute to the effect of the COVID-19 lockdowns.
- 16 November – Ben Hamilton, a County Durham businessman who claimed a £25,000 Bounce Back Loan in May 2020 then dissolved his business the following day is given a 15-month suspended sentence after admitting to fraud at a hearing at Teesside Magistrates' Court.

=== December 2022 ===
- 30 December – The UK government confirms that passengers arriving in England from China will need to provide a negative COVID test before boarding their flight when China fully reopens its borders on 8 January.

== See also ==
- Timeline of the COVID-19 pandemic in England (January–June 2020)
- Timeline of the COVID-19 pandemic in England (July–December 2020)
- Timeline of the COVID-19 pandemic in England (2021)
- Timeline of the COVID-19 pandemic in the United Kingdom (January–June 2022)
- Timeline of the COVID-19 pandemic in the United Kingdom (July–December 2022)
- Timeline of the COVID-19 pandemic in Scotland (2022)
- Timeline of the COVID-19 pandemic in Wales (2022)
- Timeline of the COVID-19 pandemic in Northern Ireland (2022)
- History of the COVID-19 pandemic in the United Kingdom
