= Timeline of the COVID-19 pandemic in the United Kingdom (July–December 2022) =

Graph of COVID-19 cases for July–December 2022 from government data

The following is a timeline of the COVID-19 pandemic in the United Kingdom from July 2022 to December 2022.

There are significant differences in the legislation and the reporting between the countries of the UK: England, Scotland, Northern Ireland, and Wales. The numbers of cases and deaths are reported on a government Web site updated daily during the pandemic. The UK-wide COVID Symptom Study based on surveys of four million participants, endorsed by authorities in Scotland and Wales, run by health science company ZOE, and analysed by King's College London researchers, publishes daily estimates of the number of new and total current COVID-19 infections (excluding care homes) in UK regions, without restriction to only laboratory-confirmed cases.

== Events ==
=== July 2022 ===
- 1 July – Office for National Statistics data suggests COVID-19 cases in the UK are rising again, with 2.3 million people infected with the virus, around one in 30, in the week ending 24 June. The statistics show a 32% rise on the previous week, with the Omicron BA.4 and BA.5 variants thought to be responsible for the rise.
- 3 July – Dame Jenny Harries, chief executive of the UK Health Security Agency, warns that hospitalisations as a result of COVID-19 are likely to rise along with infections, and says people should "go about their normal lives" but in a "precautionary way".
- 8 July –
  - The latest Office for National Statistics data for the week ending 1 July suggests 2.7 million people, or one in 25, were infected with COVID-19 as the number of cases continue to rise.
  - Labour leader Sir Keir Starmer and deputy Angela Rayner are cleared of breaking lockdown rules over a Durham "beergate" meeting.
- 13 July – The number of confirmed deaths from the virus is reported to have exceeded 200,000. Omicron BA.4 and BA.5 are now the dominant subvariants.
- 14 July – Data collected from 17,500 people who tested positive for COVID-19 over the preceding week indicates a sore throat to be the top symptom with other common reported symptoms being headache, blocked nose and cough.
- 15 July –
  - The latest Office for National Statistics data for the week ending 8 July indicates 3.5 million people, roughly one in 18, were infected with COVID-19 in that week, up from one in 25, or 2.7 million, the previous week.
  - The vaccine booster programme scheduled for the coming autumn is extended to cover all adults over 50, along with younger people considered to be vulnerable and health and social care workers.
- 21 July – The UK public inquiry launches with chair Baroness Hallett promising a robust look into the UK's handling of the pandemic and whether more could have been done.
- 22 July – The latest Office for National Statistics data for the week ending 15 July shows 3.8 million COVID-19 infections in the UK, a rise of 7% on the previous week. The ONS figures show a slow in the growth of cases while data from other sources, such as the government's COVID-19 Dashboard, suggest the latest wave has already reached its peak.
- 27 July – Progress towards a pan coronavirus vaccine is announced by the Francis Crick Institute in London, following tests on mice. Antibodies targeting the S2 subunit of SARS-CoV-2's spike protein are found to neutralise multiple coronavirus variants.
- 28 July – The media watchdog Ofcom is to launch an investigation into UK news channel GB News after presenter Mark Steyn made misleading claims about COVID-19 booster vaccines on the 21 April edition of his show. Steyn had alleged that British people were being killed by having the booster and that there was a media silence on the issue.
- 29 July – Office for National Statistics data for the week up to 20 July indicates 3.2 million people in the UK were infected with COVID-19, a fall from 3.8 million the previous week and suggesting cases in the latest wave have peaked.

=== August 2022 ===
- 2 August –
  - BBC News reports that more than 16,000 businesses that took out government-backed loans designed to support them during the COVID-19 pandemic have since gone bust without paying the money back.
  - Figures produced by the Night Time Industries Association, a body representing nightclubs in the UK, indicates a 20% decrease in the number of nightclubs since March 2020. There were 1,418 nightclubs in England, Scotland and Wales in March 2020 compared to 1,130 in the latest figures.
- 3 August – Sir Patrick Vallance, the UK Government's Chief Scientific Adviser who steered the UK through the COVID-19 pandemic, announces he will step down from the role in April 2023.
- 5 August – The latest Office for National Statistics data shows another drop in the number of people in the UK with COVID-19, with 2.6 million cases in the week up to 26 July, a fall of over half a million from 3.2 million the previous week.
- 6 August – The 2022 Royal Edinburgh Military Tattoo begins. Titled "Voices" it is the first to be held since the pandemic.
- 9 August –
  - Figures published by NHS England indicate the number of people in England waiting more than two years for routine surgery has fallen from 22,500 at the start of 2022, to less than 200.
  - The 2022 Scottish Higher exam results are published, the first public examinations sat by Scottish pupils since 2019. They show a 78.9% pass rate, lower than the two preceding years when exams were cancelled because of the pandemic, but higher than the 74.8% from 2019, the last year formal examinations took place.
- 11 August – Kate Brunner QC is appointed to chair the independent review into the Isle of Man Government's response to the COVID-19 pandemic in the Isle of Man.
- 14 August – The Crown Prosecution Service confirms that six people who were charged with breaching lockdown rules after attending demonstrations in the wake of the March 2021 murder of Sarah Everard will not be prosecuted.
- 15 August – The UK becomes the first country to approve an updated Moderna vaccine that offers protection against the original COVID-19 virus, as well as the Omicron variant.
- 18 August –
  - The first post-COVID A Level results are published in England, Wales and Northern Ireland, with the number of students receiving A* grades lower than in 2021, but higher than in 2019 when the last public examinations were sat; 36.4% of A Levels were marked at A* and A in 2022, compared with 44.8% in 2021.
  - Ahead of a trial at Glasgow Sheriff Court, Margaret Ferrier, the MP for Rutherglen and Hamilton West, pleads guilty to breaching COVID-19 rules after travelling by train following a positive COVID test in September 2020.
- 19 August – The latest Office for National Statistics data, covering the first week of August, indicates that 1.7 million people had COVID-19, or one in 40.
- 24 August – The UK government announces that most hospital patients and care home residents in England will no longer be required to take COVID-19 tests, although new admissions into both will continue to be tested. Free lateral flow tests for health and social care staff will also end from 31 August.
- 25 August –
  - Conservative Party leadership candidate and former Chancellor of the Exchequer Rishi Sunak says the UK government gave too much power to scientists during the pandemic, and was not honest about the potential consequences of lockdown.
  - The first post-pandemic GCSE results are published, and highlight a difference in performance between the regions, with a third of exam results in London being top grades, while the number is a fifth in the north of England.
  - Former Newsnight presenter Emily Maitlis delivers the prestigious MacTaggart Lecture at the Edinburgh Television Festival in which she claims the BBC went out of its way to "pacify" Downing Street after she said it was clear Dominic Cummings had breached lockdown rules in 2020. Her comments are rejected by BBC Chief Content Officer Charlotte Moore.
- 28 August – The Notting Hill Carnival is held for the first time since the pandemic, the events for 2020 and 2021 having been held online.
- 30 August –
  - Recently appointed hormone-replacement therapy (HRT) tsar Madelaine McTernan returns to her role of overseeing vaccines ahead of the planned autumn COVID-19 booster programme.
  - Eurostar announces it is to suspend train services between London and Disneyland Paris from 5 June 2023 to concentrate on its core routes as it continues to recover from the effects of the pandemic.

=== September 2022 ===
- 1 September –
  - The UK COVID-19 public inquiry begins to examine decisions made by the Johnson Government at the start of the pandemic in 2020.
  - The UK's health agencies have clarified that the advice for pregnant and breastfeeding women regarding the vaccine has not changed after false information appeared on social media claiming that they were now being advised not to have the vaccine.
- 5 September – The deployment of the Autumn 2022 COVID-19 booster programme begins in England, with care home residents and people who are housebound the first to be offered the vaccine.
- 12 September – Data released by the Office for National Statistics indicates cases of COVID-19 are at their lowest since October 2021, with fewer than a million people (roughly one in 70) with the virus in the last week of August.
- 13 September – Margaret Ferrier, the MP who travelled by train from London to Scotland after receiving a positive COVID test in September 2020, is given 270 hours of community service after previously pleading guilty at Glasgow Sheriff Court to culpably and recklessly exposing the public to the virus.
- 23 September – Office for National Statistics data for the week up to 14 September indicates the first rise in COVID-19 infections since mid-July, with one in 70 people having the virus and the largest increase among secondary school students.
- 24 September – An article in The Times quotes scientists who suggests the Omicron variant could be "the last Covid-19 variant we have to battle" since it has lasted longer than any previous variant, and the coronavirus may therefore be settling down.

=== October 2022 ===
- 4 October – The first preliminary hearing of the COVID-19 inquiry is held. Chair Baroness Hallett says those who have suffered will be at the inquiry's heart.
- 5 October – Campaigners have criticised First Minister of Wales Mark Drakeford for being insensitive after he said those wishing to have a separate COVID-19 inquiry for Wales have "moved on". In response the Welsh Government says Drakeford was referring to the group having "shifted their focus", and that a UK-wide inquiry can better for examining decisions made by the four nations of the UK.
- 7 October – The latest Office for National Statistics data suggests around 1.3 million people (or one in 50) are infected with COVID-19, with a high prevalence of those cases in those aged over 70. The news prompts health experts to urge people to avoid vulnerable friends, relatives and colleagues as a precaution.
- 10 October – The 2022 BAFTA Cymru Awards Ceremony is held in Cardiff, the first to take place in-person since the start of the COVID-19 pandemic.
- 11 October – The Celtic Connections Festival returns for the first time since January 2020, having been postponed and run as an online event due to the pandemic.
- 13 October – The latest health figures show that hospital waiting lists in England have reached seven million, their highest since records began.
- 14 October –
  - The latest COVID-19 data from the Office for National Statistics suggests 1.7 million people (roughly 2.7% of the population or one in 37) is infected with COVID-19, a rise from the previous week when the figure was one in 50.
  - Ofcom announces an investigation into GB News over its coverage of matters relating to COVID-19 vaccination following an interview with the author Naomi Wolf that aired on 4 October, and during which she claimed women were being harmed by COVID-19 vaccines as part of an effort "to destroy British civil society", while likening the behaviour of the medical profession to that of Nazi Germany. Ofcom's investigation will cover whether the interview broke "rules designed to protect viewers from harmful material", and is the second such investigation into the news channel.
- 18 October – NHS England warns that up to half of its hospital beds could be taken up with patients suffering respiratory problems because of a "twindemic" of COVID-19 and flu over the coming winter.
- 28 October – Office for National Statistics data for the week ending 17 October indicates around two million COVID-19 infections in the UK, roughly one in 30 people with the virus. These figures are relatively similar to those for the previous week.
- 31 October – The COVID-19 public inquiry has asked to see former Prime Minister Boris Johnson's WhatsApp messages from his time as prime minister as part of its investigation into decision making.

=== November 2022 ===
- 4 November – The latest Office for National Statistics data indicates there were 1.9 million COVID-19 cases in the week up to 24 October, with around one in 35 people having the virus. Cases in England and Wales fell from the previous week, while there was a slight rise in Northern Ireland, with figures uncertain for Scotland.
- 7 November – Analysis by BBC News has indicated a 10% rise in the number of five- and six-year-olds in England requiring speech therapy in the past year, something that experts partially attribute to the effect of the COVID-19 lockdowns.
- 9 November – Derby-based SureScreen Diagnostics has become one of the first companies in the UK to be given to go-ahead to supply a dual COVID and flu testing kit by the UK Health Security Agency's Coronavirus Test Device Approvals (CTDA) process.
- 11 November –
  - The latest Office for National Statistics data indicates a general fall in the number of cases of COVID-19 in the UK, with 1.5 million people testing positive for the virus in the week up to 1 November. This represents an 18% fall on the previous week, and appears to indicate the latest wave of cases is receding.
  - The Metropolitan Police confirms no action will be taken against London Mayoral candidate Shaun Bailey and other members of the Conservative Party who attended a party at Conservative headquarters in December 2020 while London was subject to lockdown measures.
  - Kate Brunner KC, who is running the independent review into the Isle of Man Government's handling of the COVID-19 pandemic in the Isle of Man, has called for the review to cover a wider period of time, from November 2019 to April 2022; presently it only covers the period up to September 2021.
- 15 November – The pressure group Covid-19 Bereaved Families for Justice says it has flown a banner over the set of ITV's I'm a Celebrity...Get Me Out of Here! demanding former Health Secretary Matt Hancock's removal from the programme.
- 18 November – Data released by the Office for National Statistics for the week up to 8 November indicate 1.1 million people tested positive for COVID-19, a 27% fall from 1.5 million the previous week. In England the number of cases is shown as being under a million for the first time since September.
- 22 November – Kym Marsh will not participate in the 26 November edition of BBC One's Strictly Come Dancing after testing positive for COVID-19.
- 28 November – A trial of the blood thinner Apixaban as a potential treatment for COVID-19 on 1,000 hospital patients with the virus has concluded that it "puts patients at risk for no clear benefit".
- 29 November – A report by the UK Health Security Agency concludes that staff mistakes made by the Wolverhampton-based Immensa laboratory may have led to an extra 23 COVID-19-related deaths when positive tests were incorrectly identified as negative.

=== December 2022 ===
- 1 December – An extract of Matt Hancock's diaries, which are being serialised by the Daily Mail, suggests that the former Health Secretary objected to a Ministry of Justice plan to release "thousands" of non-violent prisoners at the start of the pandemic in March 2020 as a way of curbing the virus's spread in prisons and relieving pressure on the health service.
- 2 December – Office for National Statistics data for the week up to 21 November indicates COVID-19 infections in the UK have risen above one million again following a 6% increase from 972,400 the previous week. Infections have also risen in England for the first time since mid-October.
- 3 December – In the latest extracts to be published from Matt Hancock's diaries, the former Health Secretary claims he was told by England's Chief Medical Officer in January 2020 that 800,000 people could die as a result of COVID-19.
- 6 December –
  - An inquest opens into the March 2020 death of Ismail Mohamed Abdulwahab, the first child known to have died from COVID-19 in the UK. It will examine whether mistakes were made in the hospital treatment given to the 13-year-old, who lived in Brixton, South London.
  - Conservative Party peer Michelle Mone is to request a leave of absence from the House of Lords to clear her name after allegations she benefitted a company she recommended for a COVID contract.
- 7 December – Cesar Franco from Streatham becomes the first person in the UK to receive a double lung transplant following complications after contracting COVID-19.
- 9 December – The latest Office for National Statistics data indicates 1.1 million tested positive for COVID-19 in the week up to 26 November, roughly 1.7% of the population. The data also shows the number of cases has increased slightly in England and Northern Ireland, but not in Scotland and Wales.
- 13 December – Moderna and MSD have developed an experimental mRNA vaccine for cancer which employs the same messenger RNA technology used in COVID-19 vaccines.
- 14 December – A hearing at Suffolk Coroner's Court concludes that a man who died in April 2021 from a cerebral venous sinus thrombosis (CVST) did so as a "direct result" of receiving the AstraZeneca COVID-19 vaccine. Jack Last, aged 27, from Stowmarket, received the vaccine on 30 March 2021 and was admitted to hospital a few days later after experiencing headaches and sickness.
- 16 December – A rapid surge in flu is reported, with hospital admissions from the virus overtaking those of COVID-19.
- 19 December – The UK government commences legal proceedings against PPE Medpro, a company that supplied it with personal protective equipment (PPE) in 2020, for breach of contract. The government is seeking £122m plus costs over medical gowns supplied during the pandemic. The company won a government contract through the "VIP lane" after being recommended by Baroness Michelle Mone.
- 20 December – A report published by the House of Lords Economic Affairs Committee has highlighted an increase in economic activity since the start of the pandemic, with a further 565,000 people economically inactive since 2020. Early retirement is cited as the main reason for the increase, and is a reverse in the pre-2020 trend when economic inactivity was falling.
- 22 December – A trial of the antiviral drug Molnupiravir involving 25,000 COVID-19 patients has found that although it speeds up recovery time, the percentage of admissions to hospital and deaths were not reduced.
- 23 December –
  - Office for National Statistics data for the week ending 9 December indicates that 1.4 million people in the UK (around one in 45) were infected with COVID-19. Cases in England and Scotland had risen from the previous week, while they were uncertain for Wales and Northern Ireland. The data also shows that cases of influenza were also at their highest since the winter of 2017–18.
  - The UK Health Security Agency warns people who are feeling unwell with flu or COVID-19 not to visit vulnerable relatives over the festive season.
- 26 December – The UK Health Security Agency confirms it will stop publishing coronavirus modelling data from early January 2023.
- 29 December – Secretary of State for Defence Ben Wallace confirms that the UK's response to China's recent decision to lift its Zero COVID policy is "under review". A number of other countries have placed travel restrictions on China following the announcement that its Zero COVID policy is to end and its borders will reopen in January 2023.
- 30 December – The UK government confirms that passengers arriving in England from China will need to provide a negative COVID test before boarding their flight when China fully reopens its borders on 8 January.
- 31 December –
  - The day's edition of The Times reports that England's Chief Medical Officer, Sir Chris Whitty, has warned ministers that thousands of middle-aged people are dying of heart conditions because they did not receive medication such as statins or blood pressure tablets during the pandemic.
  - Among those to be recognised in the 2023 New Year Honours is BBC Radio 2 presenter DJ Spoony for his work with charity through music during the COVID-19 pandemic.

== See also ==
- Timeline of the COVID-19 pandemic in the United Kingdom (January–June 2020)
- Timeline of the COVID-19 pandemic in the United Kingdom (July–December 2020)
- Timeline of the COVID-19 pandemic in the United Kingdom (January–June 2021)
- Timeline of the COVID-19 pandemic in the United Kingdom (July–December 2021)
- Timeline of the COVID-19 pandemic in the United Kingdom (January–June 2022)
- Timeline of the COVID-19 pandemic in the United Kingdom (2023)
- Timeline of the COVID-19 pandemic in the United Kingdom (2024)
- Timeline of the COVID-19 pandemic in England (2022)
- Timeline of the COVID-19 pandemic in Scotland (2022)
- Timeline of the COVID-19 pandemic in Wales (2022)
- Timeline of the COVID-19 pandemic in Northern Ireland (2022)
- History of the COVID-19 pandemic in the United Kingdom
- COVID-19 vaccination programme in the United Kingdom
