= Timeline of the COVID-19 pandemic in Northern Ireland (2022) =

Daily Northern Irish events related to the pandemic in 2022

The following is a timeline of the COVID-19 pandemic in Northern Ireland during 2022. There are significant differences in the legislation and the reporting between the countries of the UK: England, Scotland, Northern Ireland, and Wales.

== Timeline ==
=== January 2022 ===
- 1 January – Animal charities in Northern Ireland warn they face a "deluge" of unwanted dogs as people who adopted dogs during lockdown seek to offload them.
- 2 January – Figures show that COVID cases currently stand at 1,619.8 per 100,00, with the seven day rolling average for the final week of 2021 being above 5,000 daily cases; this is up from 2,000 the previous week.
- 3 January –
  - Northern Ireland's Public Health Agency reports COVID outbreaks were present in at least 120 care homes over the New Year weekend.
  - Figures obtained by BBC News indicate at least 500 children are waiting for urgent dental treatment in Northern Ireland, with the Southern Trust the worse affected area where there is a 53-week wait for an urgent extraction.
  - The NASUWT teaching union urges the Stormont Executive to take action to prevent further disruption in schools due to COVID.
- 4 January –
  - Northern Ireland's Chief Scientific Officer, Professor Ian Young, tells the BBC that COVID infections have reached "extraordinary levels" in Northern Ireland, with one in ten people having the disease in some parts of the country.
  - Education Minister Michelle McIlveen advises schools to reopen with similar COVID measures to those implemented before Christmas, saying that getting schools open again amid high COVID infections remains a priority.
- 5 January – BBC News reports that vulnerable primary school children in Northern Ireland are likely to be offered a low dose vaccine by the end of January.
- 6 January –
  - First Minister Paul Givan says no further COVID restrictions are needed in Northern Ireland despite a surge in Omicron variant cases.
  - The number of COVID-related deaths in Northern Ireland passes 3,000 as a further four cases take the total since March 2020 to 3,002.
  - The Unison trade union says that absences due to COVID related issues are running at around one in ten in Northern Ireland's health service.
- 8 January – The Omicron variant has taken over as the dominant COVID variant in Northern Ireland, it is reported.
- 10 January –
  - Northern Ireland's blood transfusion service says that blood stocks are "significantly down" because of problems caused by the pandemic, and that donations were down by a third over the new year.
  - During a Stormont debate on the pressures facing schools because of COVID, Education Minister Michelle McIlveen says it would cost as much as £40 million to equip every classroom with air filters.
- 12 January – Health Minister Robin Swann makes another request for military help for Northern Ireland's health service.
- 14 January –
  - Figures from Nisra show that COVID was mentioned on 29 death certificates in the week to 7 January, a rise of 15 on the previous week.
  - Ulster University tells its students that face-to-face teaching will resume when the new term begins on 24 January.
- 15 January – No further COVID deaths are reported for this date in Northern Ireland.
- 17 January – Figures show that more than half of schools in Northern Ireland had staff absences due to COVID in the first full week of the new term.
- 18 January – Trainee orthopaedic surgeons have written a letter to Health Minister Robin Swann expressing concern about a significant reduction in elective surgery in Northern Ireland.
- 19 January –
  - Health Minister Robin Swann announces that an extra £25m will be channelled into health sector pay.
  - Hospitality businesses eligible for grants of up to £20,000 under the Omicron Hospitality Payment scheme are set to receive money in the next 10 days. The scheme was established in December to compensate hospitality businesses affected by the pandemic.
- 20 January –
  - Ministers agree to scrap the use of COVID passports in pubs and restaurants from Midday on 26 January.
  - The Department of Education is to get an extra £40m from the reallocation of money across Stormont departments, the majority of it for COVID-related expenses such as the hiring of supply teachers to cover absences.
- 21 January – The period of self-isolation following a positive COVID test is cut from seven to five days. The rules requiring table service at pubs and restaurants are also relaxed.
- 25 January – Northern Ireland follows England and Scotland by announcing that fully vaccinated travellers from abroad will no longer need COVID tests when arriving back in Northern Ireland after 11 February.
- 26 January – Public transport operator Translink announces that bus and rail services will begin to return to pre-Omicron levels from Monday 31 January, with Metro services increasing from that day, while bus and rail services will increase from 7 February.
- 27 January –
  - Northern Ireland scraps COVID passports for pubs, bars and restaurants from 12pm, but they continue to be required for nightclubs and large events. Nightclubs can also reopen while indoor standing events can resume.
  - Stormont ministers back proposals to provide financial support for hotel operators affected by the pandemic.

=== February 2022 ===
- 1 February – Education figures show that 20% of pupils were absent from school due to COVID in the week beginning 24 January, the highest number of the 2021–22 academic year.
- 3 February – Scientists believe a new subvariant of Omicron could be behind a COVID surge in Northern Ireland.
- 7 February – Health Minister Robin Swann has said he is taking legal advice on how he can "replace the bulk of remaining Covid-19 restrictions", with a view to doing so "this week".
- 10 February – It is reported that Stormont lawyers have advised Health Minister Robin Swann that he cannot act alone in lifting all of Northern Ireland's COVID rules and must work with the Executive to do so.
- 13 February – Justice Minister Naomi Long says that she has given Health Minister Robin Swann assurance that ending COVID regulations would not be "controversial" as long as they are in line with advice from health officials, and that he is therefore "empowered" to remove them.
- 14 February – Health Minister Robin Swann announces that all remaining COVID regulations in Northern Ireland will be lifted from the following day and replaced with guidelines.
- 15 February – All COVID regulations are lifted in Northern Ireland.
- 16 February – The Department of Health confirms that all children aged between five and eleven will be offered a COVID vaccine.
- 17 February –
  - The Department of Health announces the further lifting of restrictions on care home visits, with no limits on the number of visitors, but individual residents are limited to visitors from two separate households per day.
  - The Department of Education has said post-primary schoolchildren should continue to wear face coverings after the February half-term.
- 21 February – Health Minister Robin Swann says the Department of Health will "carefully consider" the implications for Northern Ireland of changes announced for England that will see the end of the legal requirement to self-isolate following a positive COVID test from 24 February. Swann also confirms there will be no change to Northern Ireland's test and trace system.
- 22 February –
  - Health Minister Robin Swann says he will not be "rushed" into taking decisions on rules concerning the use of free mass testing in Northern Ireland following changes announced in England.
  - Jennifer Welsh, chief executive of Northern Trust, warns that Northern Ireland's health service is "incredibly fragile" and seeing "very sick patients". Her comments come after a potential major incident was declared at Antrim Area Hospital when the number of A&E patients waiting for treatment outstripped staff capacity for several hours.
- 25 February – An investigation is under way at the Southern Health Trust after almost 200 people were possibly given an inaccurate COVID test result. The affected tests are linked to a bottle of solution at the laboratory.

=== March 2022 ===
- 4 March – People in Northern Ireland are being urged to participate in a study that will decide how antiviral drugs will be used to treat COVID, with the drug Molnupiravir currently being used.
- 10 March – Figures produced by the Office for National Statistics suggest daily COVID cases in Northern Ireland could be as high as 20,000 in Northern Ireland, while official figures from the Department of Health are registering around 2,500 daily cases. It is thought the figures could be skewed by the end of free testing.
- 14 March – Health Minister Robin Swann sets out plans to extend the Department of Health's powers under the Coronavirus Act 2020 for a further six months, but admits reintroducing any measures would be virtually impossible without an Executive, which collapsed in February following the resignation of Paul Givan as First Minister.
- 17 March – Thousands of people take to the streets in Northern Ireland and the Irish Republic to celebrate St Patrick's Day as events to mark the day return for the first time since 2019.
- 18 March – No COVID deaths are reported on this date.
- 21 March – Post primary schoolchildren in Northern Ireland are no longer required to wear masks in classrooms.
- 24 March – Northern Ireland's Health Minister, Robin Swann, confirms that most people in Northern Ireland will no longer be eligible for free COVID testing from 22 April, although lateral flow tests will continue to be free for people displaying symptoms. Swann also confirms that routine contract tracing is to be phased out in Northern Ireland between mid-April and June.

=== April 2022 ===
- 8 April – Virginia McVea, Northern Ireland's Chief Electoral Officer, confirms people infected with COVID will be able to vote in person at the forthcoming 2022 Northern Ireland Assembly election since absent voting rules do not cover people with COVID-19.
- 13 April – The Royal College of GPs confirms that the "phone first" GP consultation system adopted during the pandemic is "here to stay".
- 16 April – The Public Health Agency confirms that five cases of a new COVID variant, Omicron XE have been found in Northern Ireland. The variant is a derivative of the BA.1 and BA.2 variants.
- 22 April – Free universal PCR tests come to an end in Northern Ireland.
- 23 April – Northern Ireland records a day without any COVID-related deaths.
- 24 April – No COVID deaths are recorded in Northern Ireland for a second consecutive day.
- 28 April – Families of care home residents want to know why hospital patients were discharged to homes without being tested for COVID-19.

=== May 2022 ===
- 1 May – The annual Belfast Marathon returns to its traditional May Bank Holiday weekend date for the first time since 2019.
- 3 May – A study carried out by Queen's University Belfast suggests that Stormont's Spend Local scheme should have targeted businesses forced to close during the pandemic.
- 4 May – Two men who took part in a guard of honour at the funeral of former Sinn Féin councillor Francie McNally during the pandemic have been fined for breaching COVID regulations.
- 5 May – As polling opens for the 2022 Northern Ireland Assembly election, voters are asked to wear face masks while voting at polling stations.
- 20 May – Northern Ireland's Department of Health publishes its final set of daily COVID statistics after two years of doing so. 262 positive cases are recorded and no deaths.
- 23 May – Police warn of a COVID-19 text messaging scam circulating in Northern Ireland which warns people they have been in close contact with a positive case and urges them to click on a link that leads to a website where they are asked to pay for a COVID test.
- 30 May – Sir Van Morrison launches legal action against Northern Ireland's Department of Health and Health Minister Robin Swann over an op-ed piece that appeared in Rollins Stone magazine in September 2020 that criticised Morrison's stance on COVID-19 restrictions.

== See also ==
- Timeline of the COVID-19 pandemic in Northern Ireland (2020)
- Timeline of the COVID-19 pandemic in Northern Ireland (2021)
- Timeline of the COVID-19 pandemic in the United Kingdom (January–June 2022)
- Timeline of the COVID-19 pandemic in the United Kingdom (July–December 2022)
- Timeline of the COVID-19 pandemic in England (2022)
- Timeline of the COVID-19 pandemic in Scotland (2022)
- Timeline of the COVID-19 pandemic in Wales (2022)
- History of the COVID-19 pandemic in the United Kingdom
