= Timeline of the COVID-19 pandemic in Wales (2022) =

2022 Welsh daily pandemic-related events

The following is a timeline of the COVID-19 pandemic in Wales during 2022. There are significant differences in the legislation and the reporting between the countries of the UK: England, Scotland, Northern Ireland, and Wales.

== Timeline ==
=== January 2022 ===
- 1 January –
  - Wales's Chief Medical Officer, Dr Frank Atherton, is knighted in the 2022 New Year Honours.
  - New Year celebrations in Wales are reported to have been muted in comparison to previous years due to COVID restrictions and people's concern about the virus.
- 2 January –
  - Data shows 11,820 COVID cases were recorded on 27 December 2021, the highest daily figure for Wales so far.
  - First Minister Mark Drakeford says Wales faces a "very challenging few weeks" with Omicron variant cases expected to peak later in January, but that expert advice suggests cases will fall away much faster than previous variants.
- 3 January – Morriston Hospital in Swansea warns of limited A&E capacity due to staff shortages.
- 4 January – UP to 15% of NHS staff in Wales are absent due to COVID-related reasons, and although the Omicron variant is leading to fewer serious cases, the NHS is under strain because of the volume of cases, BBC News reports.
- 5 January –
  - Due to "unprecedented levels" of demand for COVID tests, Health Minister Eluned Morgan confirms that from the following day, anyone who tests positive for COVID with a lateral flow test, but who does not have any symptoms, will not have to take a follow-up PCR test. They will still be required to self-isolate for seven days though.
  - The Welsh Rugby Union is considering playing some of its 2022 Six Nations Championship matches in England due to crowd restrictions imposed by the Welsh Government.
- 6 January –
  - First Minister Mark Drakeford confirms there will be no changes to current COVID restrictions in Wales, and warns of a "difficult month ahead" as cases reach 2,200 per 100,000.
  - Figures compiled by the Welsh Retail Consortium indicate the number of shoppers fell by a fifth in December 2021 compared to pre-pandemic levels.
  - The Public and Commercial Services Union claims that 110 COVID cases have been reported at the DVLA in Swansea during the present week.
- 7 January – Confirming there is to be no relaxation of COVID rules in Wales, First Minister Mark Drakeford accuses Prime Minister Boris Johnson of failing to take the necessary precautions to protect people in England.
- 8 January –
  - Business owners in Wales have expressed their concern for the economy if Wales plays its Six Nations matches in England as a way of getting around prohibitions on large crowds, with estimates each game could cost Cardiff alone £20million.
  - Sporting clubs are warning that Wales could "lose a generation of athletes" if sporting restrictions continue.
- 9 January – BBC News reports on the plight of Chester F.C., whose ground straddles the England–Wales border and which has been issued warnings by North Wales Police and Flintshire Council for playing two games over Christmas at which 2,000 spectators were in attendance. Such gatherings are prohibited in Wales, but allowed in England. The club says that it will face financial hardship if spectators are not allowed to attend games.
- 10 January –
  - Schools in all parts of Wales return for face-to-face lessons.
  - Anna Redfern, owner of Swansea-based Cinema & Co, launches an appeal against her £15,000 fine for refusing to implement COVID pass checks at her premises.
- 11 January –
  - First Minister Mark Drakeford announces that the Welsh Government will look at relaxing COVID rules when they are reviewed again the following week, but that it is a "big if" whether the situation will allow them to be relaxed.
  - Figures presented by Health Minister Eluned Morgan show around 10,000 NHS staff are self-isolating through COVID-related reasons, the highest number since April 2020.
- 12 January – BBC News reports that around 3,000 people testing positive for COVID have received antiviral tablets in a trial being run by Public Health Wales, Health and Care Research Wales and Cardiff University, and which began on 8 December 2021.
- 14 January – First Minister Mark Drakeford confirms that most COVID restrictions in Wales will be lifted over the next two weeks if cases continue to fall and as Wales moves to Alert Level Zero. An immediate change is that the number of people allowed to attend outdoor events rises from 50 to 500.
- 15 January – Sports clubs and Parkrun have welcomed the rule changes that allow 500 people to gather outdoors.
- 17 January – Economy Minister Vaughan Gething says restrictions introduced in Wales to combat the Omicron variant of COVID "have been worth it" because more people would have come to harm without them.
- 21 January – Wales scraps limits on the number of people who can attend sporting events, and lifts the rule of six requirements for pubs and restaurants operating outdoors. But while confirming the changes, First Minister Mark Drakeford accuses the UK government of caring more about distracting people from its troubles than it does about COVID.
- 23 January – First Minister Mark Drakeford says he would "not rule out" recruiting NHS staff from England who lose their jobs because they have not received the vaccine.
- 24 January – Care providers in Wales have suggested they could employ a small number of unvaccinated staff from England.
- 25 January –
  - First Minister Mark Drakeford tells people that it is ok for them to take holidays abroad, the first time the Welsh Government has not advised against foreign travel since the start of the pandemic.
  - Scientific adviser for health Dr Rob Orford says extra COVID advice introduced in December was not an over-reaction, and that he "very much hopes" future lockdowns will not be needed.
- 27 January – Health figures for 25 January show more than half of the people in hospital with COVID are being treated for other conditions; 42% were in hospital for COVID on that day with the rest being "incidental" COVID cases.
- 28 January – Wales cuts the period of self-isolation following a positive COVID test to five full days, ringing it into line with rules in England and Northern Ireland. Other changes include the reopening of nightclubs, an end to the rule of six requirement in pubs and restaurants and the scrapping of social distancing requirements.
- 29 January – Epidemiologist Professor John Watkins voices concern about plans to leave decisions about the wearing of face coverings in schools to local authorities and headteachers, saying this should not happen. The rules are scheduled to change after the February half-term.
- 30 January – A cross-party Senedd committee report highlights the lack of childcare places for disabled children and how parents felt isolated during the pandemic. The report says 38% of councils do not have enough childcare for disabled children. In response the Welsh Government says work is under way to expand the number of facilities.
- 31 January – Figures from Digital Health and Care Wales indicate there were 551 people in hospital with COVID on 28 January, a 20% drop on the previous week.

=== February 2022 ===
- 2 February – A handful of schools and one college are trialling a longer day for ten weeks in the hope that increasing socialisation for pupils and students following the pandemic will lead to progress more quickly.
- 4 February – Cardiff-based Yolk Recruitment is to pay for its 55 staff members to take a four-day break in Tenerife as a reward for working through the pandemic.
- 7 February – BBC News Online reports that despite the lifting of travel restrictions many Welsh holiday resorts are fully booked for 2022.
- 10 February –
  - The Welsh Government confirms that around 53,000 care workers in Wales will receive a £1,000 bonus from April as part of the introduction of the living wage.
  - First Minister Mark Drakeford confirms that falling COVID case rates means that rules can begin to be lifted, with COVID passes no longer required for entertainment venues, nightclubs and large events from 18 February, and the facemask mandate for schools and most public places, such as cinemas, museums and places of worship, lifted from 28 February. Schools will then decide their own policy on face coverings, while requirements for them on public transport, and in shops, hairdressers, salons and health and social care could disappear as early as March.
  - Drakeford has tested positive for COVID.
- 13 February – Betsi Cadwaladr University Health Board urges vulnerable children aged 5–11 to get a COVID vaccine, and is also offering children of the same age vaccines if they live with a vulnerable adult.
- 14 February – New data shows that 95% of hospital patients with COVID in the Hywel Dda and Aneurin Bevan health boards are being treated for other conditions.
- 15 February – Wales becomes the first of the UK's constituent countries to announce plans to offer COVID vaccinations to children aged between five and eleven.
- 17 February –
  - Health data from Wales shows there were 683,331 people waiting for non-urgent surgery in December 2021, a record number and the 20th consecutive month where records have been broken.
  - The Welsh Government announces the scrapping of COVID passes for large events in Wales, and venues such as nightclubs and cinemas, from the following day.
- 23 February – BBC News reports that Ceredigion, one of the towns to introduce wider pavements and one-way streets during lockdown to aid social distancing, has decided to keep the measures in place.
- 24 February – The Welsh Government suggests that COVID and flu vaccines could be given to patients at the same time in the autumn.
- 28 February – Changes to COVID regulations in Wales mean that facemasks are no longer required in classrooms and venues such as museums and cinemas, but they continue to be a legal requirement in shops, salons, hairdressers, health and social care settings, as well as on public transport.

=== March 2022 ===
- 2 March – BBC News online reports on the phenomenon of "pandemic brain", a condition that sees people experiencing memory loss, fatigue and lack of concentration because of disruption to routine and uncertainty.
- 4 March –
  - The Welsh Government confirms plans to phase out free mass testing for COVID in Wales from the end of March, and gives a provisional date of 28 March for all regulations to be lifted.
  - However, leading business group CBI Wales urges the Welsh Government to continue to provide free lateral flow tests and to phase them out gradually throughout the year.
- 6 March – Health Minister Eluned Morgan says the Welsh Government is reluctant to wind down COVID testing over the coming months, but that it will be difficult to fund once the UK government ends universal free testing.
- 24 March – The Welsh Government confirms plans to proceed with the scrapping of some COVID regulations in Wales from Monday 28 March despite an increase in case numbers. From that date face coverings will no longer be a legal requirement in shops and on public transport, but will continue to be required in health and care settings. Companies will also need to continue making workplace risk assessments. All rules were scheduled to expire on 28 March, but the remaining measures have been extended for three weeks, with a review planned for 14 April.
- 27 March – Teaching unions have described disruption from COVID in schools as being as bad now as it was at any time during the pandemic as they struggle to deal with staff absences.
- 28 March – The planned lifting of COVID measures announced on 24 March goes ahead.
- 29 March – Senedd members vote 29–11 to approve the latest COVID law changes.
- 30 March –
  - Health Minister Eluned Morgan describes Wales's NHS as being under "extraordinary pressure" as it deals with a rise in COVID cases.
  - COVID test centre staff in Wales claim to have been "thrown to the wolves" after some were given short notice of days that their jobs would disappear.
- 31 March – Health Minister Eluned Morgan warns that planned treatment across the NHS in Wales is expected to slow down due to COVID.

=== April 2022 ===
- 8 April – Headteachers have expressed their concern that pupils preparing to sit exams in the summer may be at an unfair disadvantage after missing specialist teaching during the pandemic; 2022 is the first years exams will be sat since the onset of the pandemic, with exams in 2020 and 2021 replaced by classroom-based assessment.
- 9 April – Pharmacists have expressed their concern about a shortage of lateral flow tests in Wales, particularly in rural areas, and fear this will lead to people testing themselves less frequently.
- 11 April – The Welsh Government is criticised for spending £32,000 on Unlocked: Covid Stories from Wales, a 10-episode podcast in which First Minister Mark Drakeford defends his record on dealing with the pandemic.
- 13 April – The law requiring workplaces in Wales to take COVID-safe precautions is to be lifted from Monday 18 April, the Welsh Government confirms.
- 20 April – NHS managers have described the COVID situation in Wales as "relentless", with cases continuing to affect the health service even though people are not getting so ill.
- 21 April – A teacher who sent a vulnerable pupil out of class for taking off his facemask to sip water, and then forgot to check on him, has been dismissed from her post.
- 22 April – Figures from the Office for National Statistics indicate the number of COVID-related deaths in Wales has passed 10.000, with 10,019 deaths recorded as of the week up to 8 April.
- 24 April – Health Minister Eluned Morgan has dismissed claims from doctors that the NHS in Wales is broken, but says it is under "immense" pressure.
- 25 April –
  - As the Welsh Government prepares to publish a strategy for reducing the NHS backlog, it is estimated that it could be 2025 before waiting times for many procedures are under a year.
  - Around 500 beds and mattresses urgently procured to furnish the Swansea Bay Field Hospital are to be donated to vulnerable people, including families displaced by the 2022 Russian invasion of Ukraine.

=== May 2022 ===
- 2 May – Business experts in Wales have urged that companies struggling following the pandemic need better access to small loans.
- 5 May – With the requirement to wear face masks about to end for schools, First Minister Mark Drakeford confirms they will still be required in health and care settings.
- 8 May – Services resume at Soar y mynydd chapel following the pandemic; the chapel believed to be the remotest place of worship in Wales.
- 9 May – Face masks are no longer required to be worn in schools in Wales.
- 13 May – The exam watchdog Qualifications Wales confirms that pupils in Wales will continue to receive advance notice of exam content during the 2022–23 academic year.
- 15 May –
  - Children’s commissioner Rocio Cifuentes has urged caution when it comes to fining parents whose children are absent from school, saying that some children have found it difficult to adjust to being back at school again following the pandemic.
  - A police officer has been sacked by North Wales Police for allegedly leaking the name of a woman who reported her aunt and uncle to police over a planned lockdown rule breaking party.
- 19 May – As of midday the daily reporting of COVID statistics in Wales comes to an end, with figures reported weekly from now on.
- 30 May –
  - The wearing of face coverings in health and social care settings in Wales is no longer a legal requirement, thus ending the last of Wales's COVID regulations.
  - A report compiled by Wales's Auditor General, Adrian Compton, estimates it could take as long as seven years to get hospital waiting lists in Wales back to pre-COVID levels.

=== June 2022 ===
- 1 June – A number of health workers from Wales are recognised in the 2022 Birthday Honours for their work during the COVID-19 pandemic.

=== July 2022 ===
- 7 July – The annual Llangollen International Eisteddfod makes its first post-COVID return as a physical event as its celebrates its 75th anniversary, albeit the event is on a smaller scale than previously.

=== October 2022 ===
- 5 October – Campaigners have criticised First Minister Mark Drakeford for being insensitive after he said those wishing to have a separate COVID-19 inquiry for Wales have "moved on". In response the Welsh Government says Drakeford was referring to the group having "shifted their focus", and that a UK-wide inquiry can better for examining decisions made by the four nations of the UK.
- 10 October – The 2022 BAFTA Cymru Awards Ceremony is held in Cardiff, the first to take place in-person since the start of the COVID-19 pandemic.

== See also ==
- Timeline of the COVID-19 pandemic in Wales (2020)
- Timeline of the COVID-19 pandemic in Wales (2021)
- Timeline of the COVID-19 pandemic in the United Kingdom (January–June 2022)
- Timeline of the COVID-19 pandemic in the United Kingdom (July–December 2022)
- Timeline of the COVID-19 pandemic in England (2022)
- Timeline of the COVID-19 pandemic in Scotland (2022)
- Timeline of the COVID-19 pandemic in Northern Ireland (2022)
- History of the COVID-19 pandemic in the United Kingdom
