= Timeline of the COVID-19 pandemic in Scotland (2022) =

Daily Scottish events related to the pandemic in 2022

The following is a timeline of the COVID-19 pandemic in Scotland during 2022. There are significant differences in the legislation and the reporting between the countries of the UK: England, Scotland, Northern Ireland, and Wales.

== Timeline ==
=== January 2022 ===
- 1 January –
  - Although official events to celebrate New Year were cancelled in Edinburgh, crowds gathered at the location to welcome in 2022.
  - Scotland's Chief Medical Officer, Dr Gregor Smith is knighted in the 2022 New Year Honours.
  - A COVID-19 testing centre is deliberately set on fire in Dumbarton.
- 2 January – A total of five Scottish Professional Football League matches due to take place of the New Year weekend have been postponed due to team members testing positive for COVID; one game on New Year's Eve, two on New Year's Day, and a further two on 2 January.
- 3 January –
  - Scotland reports 20,217 cases, its highest daily figures so far, and the first time cases have gone above 20,000.
  - Second vaccine walk-in clinics open for those aged 12–15 who had their first vaccine twelve or more weeks ago, with them being urged to make an appointment for the vaccine before returning to school.
- 4 January –
  - ScotRail puts in place a temporary revised timetable until 28 January amid a high number of absences among its staff due to COVID.
  - Deputy First Minister John Swinney warns of "congestion" in Scotland's COVID testing system as pupils return to school and people return to work after Christmas leading to a rise in demand for tests.
  - A number of ferry services between the Scottish mainland and Isle of Arran are cancelled due to staff shortages because of COVID and bad weather.
- 6 January –
  - The number of confirmed COVID cases in Scotland since the start of the pandemic has passed one million.
  - Health Secretary Humza Yousaf says current COVID infection rates in Scotland are in line with the worst-case scenario.
  - Scotland reduces the period of self-isolation following a positive COVID test from ten to seven days, bringing it in line with England, Wales and Northern Ireland.
- 7 January –
  - International travellers to Scotland are no longer required to take a pre-departure COVID test if they are fully vaccinated, and will not need to self-isolate until getting a PCR test after arriving.
  - Police Scotland announce plans to draft around 500 special constables and probationary officers to help assist regular officers due to absences because of COVID.
  - Around 60% of patients in Scottish hospitals with COVID are there because of the virus, with the remainder having tested positive after admission for another condition, figures show.
- 8 January – The latest Scottish Government figures show that 1,362 people were in hospital with COVID on 7 January, up from 897 over the New Year, roughly a 50% increase.
- 9 January –
  - After UK Education Secretary Nadhim Zahawi says that reducing the COVID self-isolation period from seven to five days would be helpful in addressing the problem of staff shortages, Scotland's Health Secretary, Humza Yousaf, says the Scottish Government is not considering such a change.
  - Scottish Teachers for Positive Change and Wellbeing says nothing has been done to improve ventilation in classrooms almost two years after the start of the pandemic.
- 10 January – Ahead of a review of COVID restrictions planned for the following day, National Clinical Director Professor Jason Leitch says that the measures in place are helping to reduce the Omicron variant.
- 11 January –
  - First Minister Nicola Sturgeon confirms some COVID rules will be relaxed from Monday 17 January, with the limit of 500 spectators at outdoor events such as rugby and football matches removed. But restrictions on indoor venues will remain until at least 24 January.
  - The Scottish Qualifications Authority (SQA) has said that secondary examinations in Scotland should go ahead in 2022.
- 12 January –
  - Nightclub owners in Scotland have criticised the slow rollout of financial support for their businesses which have been closed since December 2021 due to tightened COVID rules.
  - GPs in Lanarkshire suspend some services in order to prioritise treatment amid COVID pressures.
- 13 January –
  - Figures show that in the week up to 11 January NHS absences were at their highest since April 2020.
  - Research from the Covid in Pregnancy study has linked catching COVID during pregnancy to complications during pregnancy and birth.
- 14 January –
  - The number of COVID-related deaths in Scotland passes 10,000 after a further 41 cases take the total to 10,038.
  - National Clinical Director Professor Jason Leitch warns the next COVID wave involving the next variant could be worse than Omicron.
  - US fugitive Nicholas Rossi, who faked his own death in 2020, is detained at a Glasgow hospital where he was using an alias, after being admitted for treatment with COVID.
- 15 January – Jillian Evans, head of health intelligence at NHS Grampian, says there is "cause for optimism" in the latest data about COVID in Scotland.
- 17 January – COVID regulations in Scotland are relaxed to allow large outdoor events such as football matches with spectators, to resume, but they require at least 50% of the crowd to be checked for vaccine certificates.
- 18 January –
  - First Minister Nicola Sturgeon confirms COVID regulations will be further relaxed from Monday 24 January, with nightclubs reopening, large indoor events resuming and social distancing rules dropped.
  - North Sea energy firm Canadian Natural Resources issues a statement confirming it will only allow members of staff who are vaccinated to work on its offshore facilities. The announcement is branded as "draconian" by the Unite trade union.
- 21 January – First Minister Nicola Sturgeon is reported to the UK Statistics Authority for "seriously" twisting Office for National Statistics figures relating to COVID during the previous day's First Minister's Questions.
- 22 January – Scotland records 30 COVID deaths, the highest daily figure since September 2021.
- 23 January –
  - First Minister Nicola Sturgeon tells the BBC's Sunday Morning programme that although she understands the "very adverse" effect Scotland's COVID measures have had on businesses and hospitality, she believes they have been "worth it".
  - The Scottish Government launches its Distance Aware scheme which allows people to obtain free badges and lanyards showing a yellow shield if they are worried about COVID risks in public spaces and wishing to indicate to others they would like to be given space.
- 25 January –
  - The UK and Scottish Governments announce that double vaccinated people arriving in England and Scotland will no longer be required to take COVID tests from 11 February.
  - Scotland confirms its work from home advice will be scrapped in favour of a "hybrid" system involving office and remote work from Monday 31 January.
  - The Scottish Government publishes the Coronavirus (Recovery and Reform) (Scotland) Bill.
- 27 January – The Scottish Government has officially rejected suggestion that any social gatherings were held by ministers or civil servants during December 2020. The statement comes in response to a Freedom of Information request from The Scotsman.
- 28 January – Rules on physical distancing and the wearing of face masks in certain circumstances are relaxed. The changes apply to indoor settings such as religious services where the two metre rule is changed to become a one-metre rule, while adults are no longer required to wear face coverings if taking part in organised activities with children under the age of five.

=== February 2022 ===
- 1 February – The Scottish Government confirms that school pupils sitting exams in 2022 will be given extra support, with a "generous" approach taken to grading.
- 2 February – Concern is raised for day care services for elderly and disabled people in Scotland, which have not returned to their pre-pandemic levels.
- 3 February – First Minister Nicola Sturgeon defends plans to spend £300,000 on cutting off the bottoms of classroom doors in order to improve air ventilation as "basic common sense".
- 7 February –
  - Opposition politicians have blamed a "complete lack of planning" during the pandemic for leading to a crisis in the NHS.
  - NHS Grampian confirms that 42 people were mistakenly given out-of-date doses of a vaccine at a vaccination centre, but say the vaccine is safe and should still offer some protection.
- 8 February –
  - As the number of people being treated for COVID in intensive care falls to 31, First Minister Nicola Sturgeon says Scotland is "through the worst" of the Omicron wave.
  - The opposition Conservative Party calls for Scotland's contact tracing service, Test and Protect, to be wound up and for the money to be redirected into the NHS.
  - ScotRail announces that 150 daily services will be re-added to the timetable from the end of May, but that peak-time services will not return to pre-pandemic levels.
- 9 February –
  - The Scottish Government announces plans to extend its COVID powers by another six months, with legislation covering mask mandates and COVID passports to be extended from 28 February to 24 September.
  - National Clinical Director Professor Jason Leitch warns that although the Omicron wave is over, the pandemic itself is only halfway through its course.
  - Charity watchdogs launch an investigation into the Christadelphian Ecclesia group following complaints about "disturbing" messages concerning the LGBT community and anti-vaccine propaganda.
- 10 February –
  - First Minister Nicola Sturgeon confirms secondary school pupils will no longer be required to wear facemasks in the classroom from 28 February.
  - Chief Medical Officer Sir Gregor Smith apologises after retweeting a Twitter post from Health Secretary Humza Yousaf that accused Prime Minister Boris Johnson of lifting self-isolation rules in England to distract attention from the Partygate scandal.
- 12 February – Jillian Evans, head of health intelligence at NHS Grampian, urges a slow and cautious move out of existing COVID restrictions, warning that the removal of self-isolation rules would be a "step too far".
- 13 February – Health Secretary Humza Yousaf warns that plans to lift COVID rules in England should not "force the hand" of the Scottish Government in doing the same.
- 15 February – Dental leaders have expressed their concern at the backlog of patients, which they describe as "enormous".
- 16 February – Scotland becomes the UK's second constituent country to announce plans to offer COVID vaccines to children aged five to eleven following advice to the Scottish Government from scientists. But the announcement comes before the Joint Committee on Vaccination and Immunisation has made a decision on its recommendations for that age group.
- 18 February – High Street pharmacy staff in Scotland report an increase in abuse from customers, which they attribute to the COVID-19 pandemic and unrealistic expectations of them.
- 19 February – Data produced by PricewaterhouseCoopers and the Local Data Company indicate that an average of four retail outlets closed each day in Scotland during 2021, an occurrence attributed to a rise in online retail brought on by the pandemic.
- 21 February – Retailers urge the Scottish Government to provide greater clarity on the COVID regulations affecting shops ahead of its plans to set out its strategy for living with the virus.
- 22 February – First Minister Nicola Sturgeon announces that all COVID legal measures in Scotland, including the wearing of face coverings, will be lifted on 21 March.
- 23 February –
  - While free mass testing for COVID is to end on 1 April in England, Scotland's deputy first minister John Swinney says it will continue in some form in Scotland beyond then.
  - Data shows that the Scottish economy shrank at twice the rate of the UK economy during December 2021 amid concern about Omicron.
- 24 February – Audit Scotland warns that NHS Scotland faces major recruitment and retention problems as it recovers from the pandemic.
- 25 February – The Scottish Government and NHS National Services Scotland are reprimanded by the UK's data watchdog over privacy failings in the NHS Scotland COVID Status app.
- 28 February – Changes to COVID regulations take effect in Scotland, where schoolchildren are no longer required to wear facemasks in class, but must continue to do so in corridors, and the requirement for large venues to implement COVID passports also ends.

=== March 2022 ===
- 2 March – Two regional adolescent psychiatric hospitals in Scotland have reported an increase in teenagers being admitted for eating disorders, with 26 in 2019 rising to 68 in 2020.
- 5 March – Chief Medical Officer Sir Gregor Smith confirms he has written to Scotland's health boards to advise them that unvaccinated women should no longer be deferred for IVF treatment.
- 7 March – Scotland begins offering a second COVID booster vaccine to older care home residents, people aged over 75, and those over 12 who have a suppressed immune system.
- 8 March – Healthcare professionals tell BBC Scotland they are seeing an increase in the number of patients turning to private healthcare so as to avoid a lengthy wait on NHS waiting lists. Cataract and hip operations are the most instances where this is happening.
- 10 March –
  - Figures indicate the number of people in hospital with COVID to be at its highest for 13 months, with 1,636 people in hospital on 9 March.
  - Douglas Ross, leader of the Scottish Conservatives, withdraws his call for Boris Johnson to resign as prime minister over the Partygate affair, saying it is important to get behind the UK government while there is war in Europe.
- 14 March – A subvariant of the Omicron variant, BA.2, is believed to be behind a surge in COVID cases in Scotland according to the chief medical officer, Professor Sir Gregor Smith, with 85% of new cases attributed to the variant.
- 15 March – Scotland's rules requiring the wearing of facemasks in shops and on public transport are extended until 4 April against the backdrop of rising COVID cases, but all other requirements on businesses are to change from legal to advisory from 21 March.
- 16 March – Public health expert Christine Tait-Burkard predicts that the present COVID surge in Scotland will peak in the next fortnight.
- 21 March –
  - The number of hospital patients testing positive for COVID in Scotland reaches a new high of 2,182, but ICU admissions are relatively low in comparison as the latest variant causes milder symptoms.
  - With COVID cases peaking again in Scotland, Dumfries and Galloway, City of Edinburgh and Fife councils have warned they may reintroduce remote learning for schools, but say that in-person teaching remains a priority.
- 22 March – The Scottish Government confirms that secondary school pupils will continue to be required to wear face coverings in communal areas of school after the Easter holiday.
- 23 March – NHS Greater Glasgow and Clyde, Scotland's biggest health board, warns it is facing COVID pressures that are "as serious as it gets".
- 30 March – First Minister Nicola Sturgeon confirms that rules regarding face coverings in shops and on public transport in Scotland will remain in place until 18 April.
- 31 March – Care home residents win the right to have a designated visitor, even during a COVID outbreak, following the Scottish Government's decision to implement Anne's Law, legislation named for Anne Duke, a care home resident whose family campaigned for visiting rights during the pandemic.

=== April 2022 ===
- 1 April – Figures from the Office for National Statistics suggest that 451,200 people in Scotland had COVID infection in the week ending 26 March, or one in every 12, but that the figure was down from the previous week's total of 473,800. Hospital numbers remain high.
- 4 April – Rules requiring people to wear face coverings in places of worship, and at weddings and funerals, come to an end in Scotland.
- 5 April –
  - New figures indicate a record number of people in Scotland are having long waits for emergency department treatment.
  - NHS Lothian apologises for an "admin error" after parents of healthy children were sent letters inviting them to have COVID vaccines because they were described as being clinically vulnerable.
- 6 April – A report produced by the Scottish Government indicates that the number of students dropping out of college increased during the pandemic.
- 13 April –
  - The Scottish Government and council body Cosla publish a joint report detailing plans to help town centres recover following the pandemic.
  - Senior NHS doctor Colin McKay has said it will take years to clear the waiting lists backlog built up during the pandemic.
  - The Scottish Government confirms that the law requiring the wearing of face coverings in many indoor settings will end from Monday 18 April, although people will continue to be strongly advised to wear them in crowded indoor spaces.
- 16 April – Public health expert Professor Linda Bauld urges people to continue to follow COVID-19 rules as they gather over the Easter holidays.
- 17 April – First Minister Nicola Sturgeon has been reported to police for breaching Scotland's rules regarding mask wearing after footage appeared on social media showing her without a face covering during a visit to a barber's shop. Officers subsequently speak to her about the incident but no further action is taken.
- 18 April – Rules regarding the wearing of face coverings in shops and restaurants, and on public transport, are lifted.
- 21 April – A Public Health Scotland study indicates that only a quarter of people in intensive care who have COVID are there because of the virus.
- 27 April – It is confirmed the Royal Edinburgh Military Tattoo will return in August, the first time the event has been staged since 2019.
- 30 April – The annual Beltane Fire Festival returns to Edinburgh's Calton Hill for the first time since 2019 following its absence during the pandemic when a virtual festival was held online.

=== May 2022 ===
- 1 May – Self-isolation guidance for people testing positive for COVID in Scotland comes to an end and is replaced by "stay at home" advice for those who are unwell.
- 20 May – Scotland's First Minister, Nicola Sturgeon, tests positive for COVID-19 after experiencing mild symptoms. The positive test comes shortly after she held talks with Sinn Féin vice president Michelle O'Neill at her official residence in Edinburgh.
- 27 May – A memorial paying tribute to those who died after testing positive for COVID-19 is unveiled at Glasgow's Pollok Park.

=== June 2022 ===
- 10 June – Office for National Statistics data shows that COVID-19 cases in Scotland have increased over a week from one in 50 to one in 40.
- 11 June – Leading epidemiologist Professor Linda Bauld says there is no need for a return to COVID measures in Scotland after Office for National Statistics data showed an increase in cases.
- 28 June – The Scottish Parliament passes the Coronavirus (Recovery and Reform) (Scotland) Bill.

=== August 2022 ===
- 4 August – A University of Edinburgh study has revealed that people living in the most deprived areas of Scotland, as well as those aged under 30, were more likely to receive fines for breaching COVID regulations.
- 6 August – The 2022 Royal Edinburgh Military Tattoo begins. Titled "Voices" it is the first to be held since the pandemic.
- 9 August – The 2022 Scottish Higher exam results are published, the first public examinations sat by Scottish pupils since 2019. They show a 78.9% pass rate, lower than the two preceding years when exams were cancelled because of the pandemic, but higher than the 74.8% from 2019, the last year formal examinations took place.
- 10 August – The Coronavirus (Recovery and Reform) (Scotland) Act 2022 receives royal assent.
- 18 August – Ahead of a trial at Glasgow Sheriff Court, Margaret Ferrier, the MP for Rutherglen and Hamilton West, pleads guilty to breaching COVID-19 rules after travelling by train following a positive COVID test in September 2020.

=== September 2022 ===
- 13 September – Margaret Ferrier, the MP who travelled by train from London to Scotland after receiving a positive COVID test in September 2020, is given 270 hours of community service after previously pleading guilty at Glasgow Sheriff Court to culpably and recklessly exposing the public to the virus.

=== October 2022 ===
- 11 October – The Celtic Connections Festival returns for the first time since January 2020, having been postponed and run as an online event due to the pandemic.

== See also ==
- Timeline of the COVID-19 pandemic in Scotland (2020)
- Timeline of the COVID-19 pandemic in Scotland (2021)
- Timeline of the COVID-19 pandemic in the United Kingdom (January–June 2022)
- Timeline of the COVID-19 pandemic in the United Kingdom (July–December 2022)
- Timeline of the COVID-19 pandemic in England (2022)
- Timeline of the COVID-19 pandemic in Wales (2022)
- Timeline of the COVID-19 pandemic in Northern Ireland (2022)
- History of the COVID-19 pandemic in the United Kingdom
