= Kate Brunner =

British judge

The Honourable Mrs Justice Brunner
- Royal coat of arms of the United Kingdom

Justice of the High Court
- Incumbent
- Assumed office 17 November 2025
- Appointed by: Charles III

Personal details
- Born: 5 August 1972 (age 54)

Dame Catherine Jane Brunner KC (born 5 August 1972) is a British judge who is a justice of the High Court.

== Biography ==
Brunner was called to the Bar (Inner Temple) in 1997 and took Silk in 2015. She worked as a barrister for Albion Chambers. In August 2022, she was appointed to chair the independent review into the Isle of Man Government's response to the COVID-19 pandemic in the Isle of Man. She was the Chair of the Code of Practice Appeal Board. She was appointed to the High Court in 2025, assigned to the King's Bench Division.

== See also ==
- List of High Court judges of England and Wales
- List of dames commander of the Order of the British Empire
