= Jonathan Van-Tam =

British public health physician (born 1964)

Professor Sir Jonathan Van-Tam MBE FRCPath FRSB FMedSci
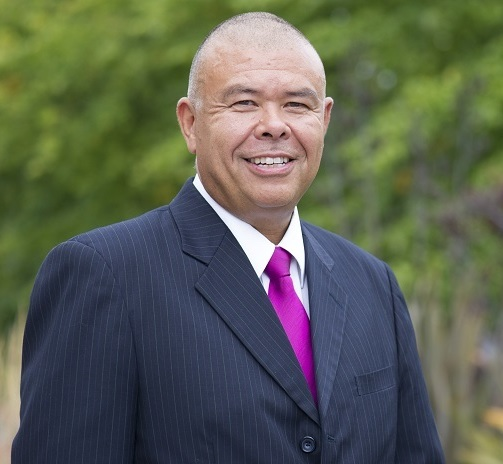
- Van-Tam in 2017

Deputy Chief Medical Officer for England
- In office 2 October 2017 – 31 March 2022 Serving with Jenny Harries (June 2019 – March 2021); Aidan Fowler (since 2020)
- Preceded by: John Watson

Personal details
- Born: Jonathan Stafford Nguyen Van-Tam; 2 February 1964 (age 62) Boston, Lincolnshire, England
- Children: 3
- Relatives: Nguyễn Văn Tâm (grandfather); Nguyễn Văn Hinh (uncle)
- Education: Boston Grammar School
- Alma mater: University of Nottingham (MBBS, BMedSci, DM)
- Profession: Public health physician
- Awards: Christmas lectures (2021) David Attenborough Award (2023)
- Nickname: JVT

Sir Jonathan Stafford Nguyen Van-Tam (born 2 February 1964) is a British physician specialising in influenza, including its epidemiology, transmission, vaccinology, antiviral drugs and pandemic preparedness.

After hospital work, Van-Tam was involved variously as a university lecturer and within the pharmaceutical industry. Van-Tam became a Deputy Chief Medical Officer for England on 2 October 2017. He played a very significant part in the UK's response to the Covid-19 pandemic which started in 2020 as one of two deputies. In May 2023 he joined Covid-19 vaccine maker Moderna as a consultant.

== Early life ==
Van-Tam was born and grew up in Boston, Lincolnshire. He is partially of Vietnamese descent; his grandfather was Nguyễn Văn Tâm, the Prime Minister of the State of Vietnam, and his uncle, Nguyễn Văn Hinh, was Chief Of Staff of the Vietnamese National Army and the first Vietnamese officer in the French Armed Forces to be promoted to the rank of general. He attended Boston Grammar School where his father, Paul Nguyen Van-Tam, was a teacher of Mathematics. He graduated in medicine from the University of Nottingham in 1987. He was awarded bachelor's degrees in Medical Sciences in 1985 and a Bachelor of Medicine, Bachelor of Surgery (BM BS) in 1987. He was awarded a Doctorate of Medicine (DM) in 2001, supported by a thesis on epidemiology.

== Career ==
After five years of hospital-based clinical medicine, Van-Tam pursued academic training in public health and epidemiology and developed an interest in influenza and respiratory viruses, mentored for many years by Professor Karl Nicholson. He became a senior lecturer at the University of Nottingham (and consultant regional epidemiologist, Public Health Laboratory Service) in 1997, before joining the pharmaceutical industry as an associate director at SmithKline Beecham in 2000.

In April 2001 he moved to Roche as head of medical affairs, before joining Aventis Pasteur MSD in February 2002 as UK medical director.

Van-Tam returned to the public sector in 2004 at the Health Protection Agency Centre for Infections, where he was head of the pandemic influenza office until October 2007. He then returned to Nottingham as professor of health protection. He has published over 100 scientific papers and written four textbooks. He chaired the European Centre for Disease Prevention and Control (ECDC) Expert Advisory Group on H5N1 human vaccines, sits on the UK national Scientific Pandemic Influenza Committee (SPI), and was a member of the UK Scientific Advisory Group for Emergencies (SAGE) during the 2009-10 pandemic. He is co-editor of the textbook Introduction to Pandemic Influenza and was editor-in-chief of the journal Influenza and Other Respiratory Viruses from 2014 to 2017.

His unit is an officially designated WHO Collaborating Centre for pandemic influenza and research and a UK Faculty of Public Health "National Treasure" research training location.

Since 2014, he has been chair of the UK government's New and Emerging Respiratory Virus Threats Advisory Group (NERVTAG).

On 2 October 2017, he took up the role of deputy chief medical officer for England. In this capacity, he gained nationwide visibility during the 2020 COVID-19 pandemic. In May 2020, he was appointed to the expert advisory group for the UK Government's Vaccine Taskforce, chaired by Patrick Vallance.

It was announced in January 2022 that Van-Tam would step down from the role of deputy chief medical officer for England at the end of March 2022. His new academic post as Faculty Pro-Vice-Chancellor for Medicine & Health Sciences at the University of Nottingham was due to start on 1 May 2022.

On 2 May 2023, Van-Tam began work as a senior medical consultant to the Covid-19 vaccine maker Moderna.

== Awards and honours ==
Van-Tam was appointed Member of the Order of the British Empire (MBE) in the 1998 New Year Honours as an acting major in the Lincolnshire Army Cadet Force. It was awarded in recognition of his work in designing a medical kit to meet the special requirements of large groups of teenagers on camping expeditions. This sprang from his work with the Lincolnshire Army Cadets since 1988. His ideas were accepted by the Ministry of Defence.

His other qualifications include Fellowships of the Faculty of Public Health (FFPH), the Royal College of Pathologists (FRCPath) and the Faculty of Pharmaceutical Medicine Hon (FFPM). He is also a Fellow of the Royal Society of Public Health (FRSPH), of the Royal Society of Biology (FRSB) and the Academy of Medical Sciences (FMedSci). He delivered the Royal Institution Christmas Lectures in 2021. In 2021, the Royal College of Physicians invited Van-Tam to hold the Harveian Oration, the most prestigious lecture of the learned society.

On 1 December 2021 he was announced as one of the Boston Heroes along with 9 other residents of Boston out of 240 put forward by the people of his home town. In March 2022 he was awarded the Freedom of the Borough of Boston in appreciation for his work on the COVID-19 pandemic.

Van-Tam was knighted in the 2022 New Year Honours for services to public health. He was unable to attend his scheduled investiture ceremony at Windsor Castle on 17 May 2022 due to self-isolating, having contracted COVID-19. He was invested by the Duke of Cambridge at Buckingham Palace on 7 July 2022.

In 2023, he was awarded the David Attenborough Award by The Royal Society for his 'outstanding public engagement with science' through communicating COVID-19.

=== Army Cadet Force (ACF) ===
In October 2022, Van-Tam was promoted to Honorary Colonel for Medical Support, in the Army Cadet Force (ACF). Van-Tam has many years of experience working with the ACF.

He was appointed Honorary Colonel Lincolnshire Army Cadet Force on 1 December 2024.

== Personal life ==
Van-Tam is a supporter and season ticket holder at Boston United F.C. He has three children.
