= Timeline of the COVID-19 pandemic in the United Kingdom (January–June 2020) =

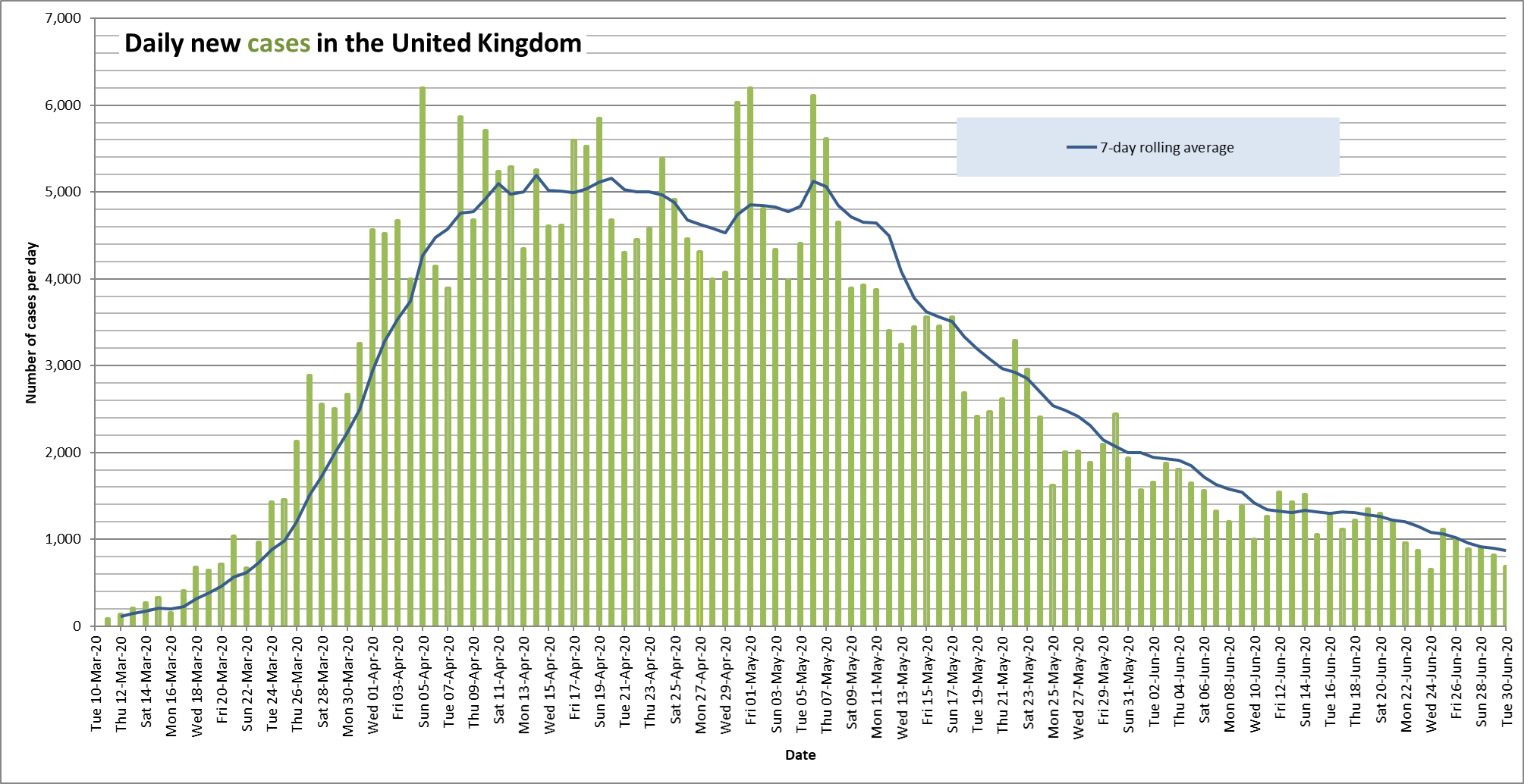
Graph of COVID-19 cases for January–June 2020 from government data

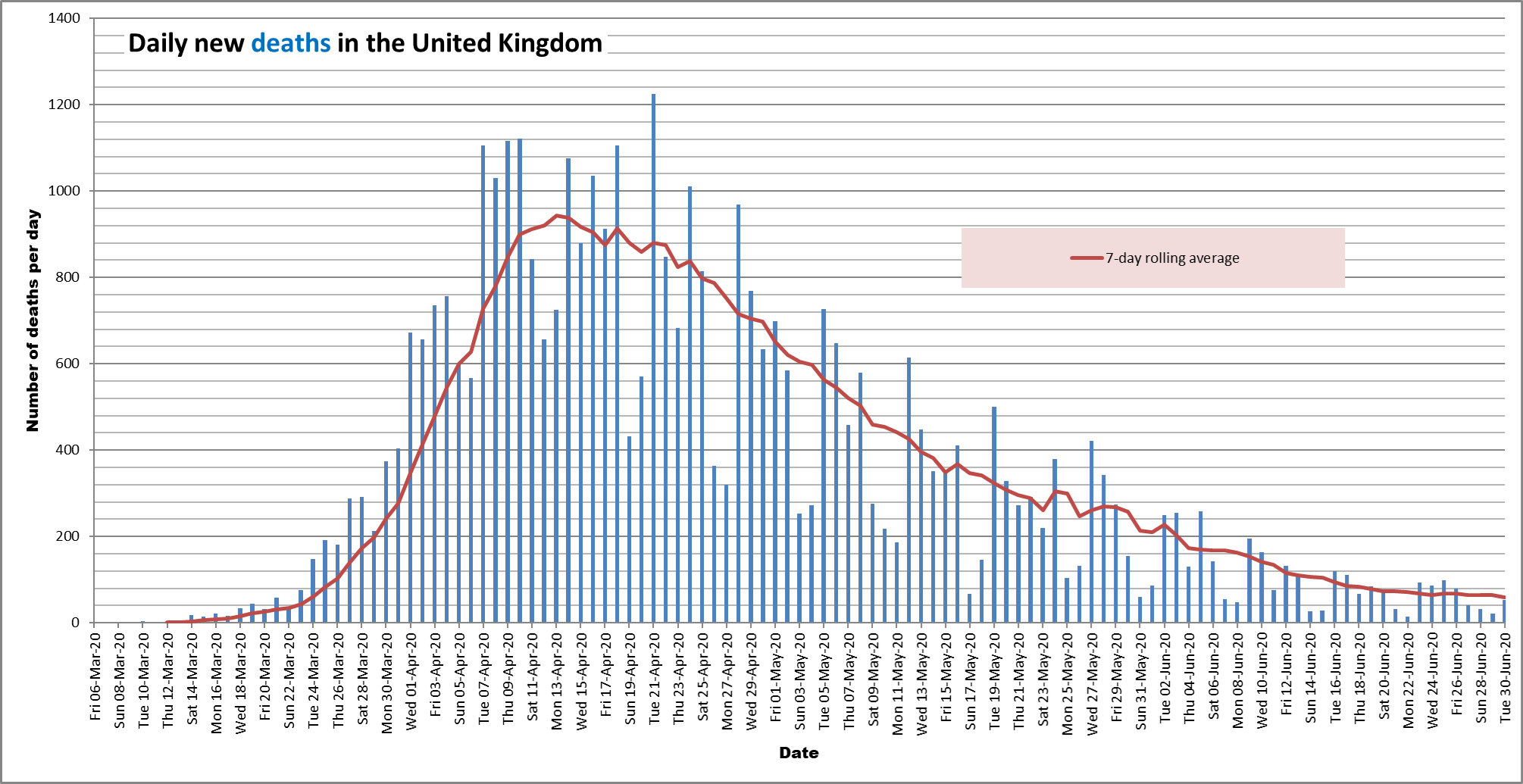
Graph of COVID-19 deaths for January–June 2020 from government data

Chart of weekly England and Wales deaths from the Office for National Statistics illustrating excess deaths

The following is a timeline of the COVID-19 pandemic in the United Kingdom from January 2020 to June 2020.

There are significant differences in the legislation and the reporting between the countries of the UK: England, Scotland, Northern Ireland, and Wales. The number of cases and deaths are reported on a government Web site updated daily during the pandemic. The UK-wide COVID Symptom Study based on surveys of four million participants, endorsed by authorities in Scotland and Wales, run by health science company ZOE, and analysed by King's College London researchers, publishes daily estimates of the number of new and total current COVID-19 infections (excluding care homes) in UK regions, without restriction to only laboratory-confirmed cases.

== Timeline ==
=== January 2020 ===
- 23 January – The Foreign and Commonwealth Office advises against all but essential travel to the city of Wuhan, the original epicentre of the outbreak.
- 25 January – The Foreign and Commonwealth Office advises against all travel to China's Hubei Province, where the city of Wuhan is located.
- 27 January – The Health Secretary, Matt Hancock, tells the House of Commons that 200 British citizens trapped in Wuhan, China, will be offered repatriation to the UK, in light of the COVID-19 outbreak there.
- 28 January – The Foreign and Commonwealth Office updates its travel advisory, advising against all but essential travel to the rest of Mainland China.
- 29 January – British Airways suspends all flights to and from mainland China with immediate effect, due to the ongoing COVID-19 threat.
- 30 January – The first two cases of COVID-19 in the United Kingdom are confirmed, two Chinese nationals staying in York.

=== February 2020 ===
- 6 February – A third case of COVID-19 is confirmed in the UK.
- 10 February – The total number of cases in the UK reaches eight as four further cases are confirmed in people linked to an affected man from Brighton.
- 11 February – A ninth case is confirmed in London.
- 23 February – The DHSC confirms a total of 13 cases in the UK as four new cases in passengers on the cruise ship Diamond Princess are detected. They are transferred to hospitals in the UK.
- 25 February – Government guidance states that travellers returning from Hubei, Iran, and certain regions of South Korea should self-isolate on reaching home or their destination, even if they have no symptoms.
- 26/27 February – There is a COVID-19 outbreak at a Nike conference in Edinburgh from which at least 25 people linked to the event are thought to have contracted the virus, including 8 residents of Scotland. Health Protection Scotland establishes an incident management team, and full contact tracing is done for delegates who have tested positive.
- 27 February
  - The total number of confirmed cases in the UK is reported as 16.
  - Authorities confirm the first case of COVID-19 in Northern Ireland.
- 28 February
  - The first British death from the disease is confirmed by the Japanese Health Ministry; a man quarantined on the Diamond Princess cruise ship.
  - Authorities confirm the first case of COVID-19 in Wales, an individual who recently returned from holiday in Italy.
- 29 February
  - Three further cases of the virus are confirmed, bringing the total number of confirmed cases to 23, after 10,483 people have been tested. Two of the three affected people had recently returned from Italy while the third had come back from Asia.
  - Around 442,675 calls were made to the non-emergency line 111 in the last week of February.

=== March 2020 ===
==== 1–10 March ====
- 1 March – A further 13 cases are reported, adding Greater Manchester to the list of areas affected and bringing the total to 36, three of which are believed to be contacts of a case in Surrey who had no history of travel abroad.
- 2 March – The government holds a COBRA meeting, attended by the Prime Minister, to discuss its preparations and response to the virus, as the number of UK cases jumps to 36.
- 3 March – The government publishes its action plan for dealing with COVID-19. This includes scenarios ranging from a milder pandemic to a "severe prolonged pandemic as experienced in 1918" and warns that a fifth of the national workforce could be absent from work during the infection's peak. The first death of a UK patient was identified in Nottingham in a retrospective study, performed by researchers at the University of Nottingham, of respiratory illness cases admitted to the Queen's Medical Centre
- 4 March – The total number of confirmed cases increases to 85.
- 5 March – The first 'official' death from COVID-19 in the UK is confirmed, as the number of cases exceeds 100, with a total of 115 having tested positive. England's Chief Medical Officer, Chris Whitty, tells MPs that the UK has now moved to the second stage of dealing with COVID-19 – from "containment" to the "delay" phase.
- 6 March – The Prime Minister announces £46 million in funding for research into a COVID-19 vaccine and rapid diagnostic tests. During a visit to a laboratory in Bedfordshire, he says: "It looks like there will be a substantial period of disruption where we have to deal with this outbreak."
- 7 March – The number of cases rises to over 200.
- 8 March – A third death from COVID-19 is reported, at North Manchester General Hospital, as the number of cases in the UK reaches 273, the largest single-day increase so far.
- 9 March
  - The FTSE 100 plunges by more than 8 per cent, its largest intraday fall since 2008, amid concerns over the spread of COVID-19.
  - The Foreign and Commonwealth Office advises against all but essential travel to Italy due to the COVID-19 outbreak in the country and the nationwide lockdown.
  - The first three cases are discovered in Dorset.
- 10 March –
  - Health minister Nadine Dorries becomes the first MP to test positive for COVID-19.
  - HM Government allows the Cheltenham Festival to go ahead. The 3-dayfestival attracted 251,684 visitors. The local NHS trust subsequently recorded twice as many COVID-19 deaths as neighbouring authorities but the local council argued that many factors may have caused this.

==== 11 March ====
- The Bank of England cuts its baseline interest rate from 0.75% to 0.25%, back down to the lowest level in history.
- Chancellor of the Exchequer, Rishi Sunak, presents the Johnson Government's first budget, which includes £30 billion in measures to protect the economy from COVID-19.

==== 12 March ====
- The UK Chief Medical Officers raise the risk to the UK from moderate to high.
- The government advises that anyone with a new continuous cough or a fever should self-isolate for seven days. Schools are asked to cancel trips abroad, and people over 70 and those with pre-existing medical conditions are advised to avoid cruises.
- Following a recent series of major falls, the FTSE100 plunges again, this time by over 10%, its biggest drop since 1987. Other markets around the world are similarly affected by ongoing economic turmoil.
- Public Health England stops performing contact tracing, as widespread infections overwhelm capacity.
- The rules published on 25 February for travellers returning from certain countries are withdrawn; they should now follow the same guidance as other households.

==== 13 March ====
- Authorities confirm the first death from COVID-19 in Scotland.
- The UK Government restricts the export of three drugs being administered to COVID-19 patients in clinical trials in China: Kaletra, Chloroquine phosphate, and Hydroxychloroquine.
- BBC Radio 1 cancels its Big Weekend music festival, scheduled to take place at the end of May. Organisers subsequently run an alternative event called Big Weekend UK 2020, with acts appearing on one of five virtual stages and performed from their homes; the event also features past performances from previous Big Weekend events.
- The Premier League and EFL football seasons are suspended.

==== 14 March ====
- The number of confirmed cases rises to 1,140.
- A further 10 people are reported to have died from COVID-19, almost doubling the UK death toll from 11 to 21. The government's aim for a "herd immunity" approach generates controversy.
- Vice President of the United States, Mike Pence, announces the US is to extend its European COVID-19 travel ban to include the UK from 16 March.
- UK retailers release a joint letter asking customers not to panic buy products after some supermarkets sell out of items such as pasta, hand gel and toilet paper.

==== 15 March ====
- The Foreign and Commonwealth Office advises against all but essential travel to Spain.
- The FCO advises against all but essential travel to the United States due to the restrictions imposed in response to the pandemic.
- Health Secretary Matt Hancock says that every UK resident over the age of 70 will be told "within the coming weeks" to self-isolate for "a very long time" to shield them from COVID-19.
- The government announces plans to hold daily televised press conferences to update the public on the fight against the COVID-19 pandemic, starting on Monday 16 March.
- London's Old Vic becomes the first West End theatre to cancel a performance because of the pandemic when it ends its run of Samuel Beckett's Endgame two weeks early.

==== 16 March ====
- The UK death toll from the pandemic reaches 55, with the number of cases of the illness passing 1,500.
- Prime Minister Boris Johnson advises everyone in the UK against "non-essential" travel and contact with others, to curb COVID-19, as well as to work from home if possible and avoid visiting social venues such as pubs, clubs or theatres. Pregnant women, people over the age of 70 and those with certain health conditions are urged to consider the advice "particularly important", and will be asked to self-isolate within days. The Department for Digital, Culture, Media & Sport states "it is advised that large gatherings should not take place".
- The government issues a call for businesses to support the supply of ventilators and ventilator components; the NHS has access to 8,175 ventilators but it is thought that up to 30,000 may be needed.
- The BBC delays its planned changes to TV licences for the over-75s from June to August because of the pandemic.
- Theatres in London, as well as elsewhere around the UK, close following Boris Johnson's advice that people should avoid such venues.

==== 17 March ====
- The Chancellor, Rishi Sunak, announces that £330bn will be made available in loan guarantees for businesses affected by the virus.
- The Foreign and Commonwealth Office advises against all non-essential international travel due to the pandemic and the border restrictions put in place by many countries in response.
- The UK government provides a £3.2million emergency support package to help rough sleepers into accommodation. With complex physical and mental health needs, in general, homeless people are at a significant risk of catching the virus.
- The BBC announces major changes to the schedule across the network. While programmes such as Politics Live, Victoria Derbyshire, The Andrew Neil Show, Newswatch, The Travel Show and HARDTalk have been suspended, others such as Newsnight and The Andrew Marr Show will continue with a smaller number of production staff. Question Time is moved to an earlier 8pm Thursday timeslot and will be broadcast without an audience from a fixed location. Podcasts programmes Americast, Beyond Today and The Next Episode are also suspended.
- Cinema chains Odeon, Cineworld, Vue and Picturehouse announce they will be closing all their UK outlets, in response to the advice to avoid visiting such venues.

==== 18 March ====
- Pound sterling falls below $1.18, its lowest level since 1985. Bank of England governor Andrew Bailey, commenting on the UK and wider economic situation, says: "It's obviously an emergency. I think we're living in completely unparalleled times... It's going to be a very big downturn – we know that."
- The UK death toll from COVID-19 exceeds 100, with 32 new cases taking the total to 104.
- The government announces that all schools in the country will shut from the afternoon of Friday 20 March, except for those looking after the children of key workers and vulnerable children. No exams will take place this academic year, Education Secretary Gavin Williamson confirms.
- Princess Beatrice cancels her wedding reception at Buckingham Palace and will take further advice on whether to carry on with a private wedding ceremony, scheduled to take place on 29 May.
- The 50th anniversary Glastonbury Festival is cancelled as a result of the pandemic.
- The government announces emergency legislation to bring in a ban on new evictions for three months, as part of measures to help protect renters in social and private rented accommodation.
- The BBC announces that due to the COVID-19 pandemic, filming on Casualty, Doctors, EastEnders, Holby City, Pobol y Cwm and River City is suspended until further notice. Weekly episodes of EastEnders will also be reduced from four to two to keep it on the air for as long as possible.
- MP Lloyd Russell-Moyle announces that he has tested positive with COVID-19.

==== 19 March ====
- The first COVID-19 death is confirmed in Northern Ireland.
- The Ministry of Defence announces the formation of the COVID Support Force, enabling the military to support public services and civilian authorities in tackling the outbreak. Two military operations are also announced: Operation Rescript, which focuses on the outbreak in the United Kingdom; and Operation Broadshare, which focuses on British military activities overseas.
- In an emergency move, the Bank of England cuts interest rates again, from 0.25% to just 0.1%. This is the lowest rate in the Bank's 325-year history.
- The government announces £1.6bn for local authorities, to help with the cost of adult social care and support for the homeless; and £1.3 billion to the NHS and social care, to allow up to 15,000 people to be discharged from hospital.
- The UK government no longer deems COVID-19 to be a "high consequence infectious disease" (HCID) following opinion from the UK HCID group and the Advisory Committee on Dangerous Pathogens.

==== 20 March ====
- Chancellor Rishi Sunak announces that the government will pay 80% of wages for employees not working, up to £2,500 a month, as part of "unprecedented" measures to protect people's jobs.
- Prime Minister Boris Johnson orders all cafes, pubs and restaurants to close from the evening of 20 March, except for take-away food, to tackle COVID-19. All the UK's nightclubs, theatres, cinemas, gyms and leisure centres are told to close "as soon as they reasonably can".

==== 21 March ====
- Environment Secretary George Eustice urges shoppers to stop panic buying, as supermarkets around the UK struggle to keep up with demand. Tesco, Asda, Aldi Süd, and Lidl are reported to have begun a recruitment drive for up to 30,000 new staff.
- The Driver and Vehicle Standards Agency announces that all pending practical and driving theory tests are to be postponed, for at least three months in the case of practical tests, and up to and including 20 April for theory tests. All candidates are to receive notification of when their tests are rescheduled.

==== 22 March ====
- The Nursing and Midwifery Council announces that more than 5,600 former nurses have registered to offer their services in the fight against COVID-19.
- Boris Johnson warns that "tougher measures" may be introduced if people do not follow government advice on social distancing.
- Downing Street confirms Foreign Secretary Dominic Raab will act in place of Prime Minister Boris Johnson if he becomes "incapacitated".
- The press reports the UK's virus's youngest victim so far, an eighteen-year-old with underlying health problems.

==== 23 March ====
- The government announces emergency measures to safeguard the nation's rail network, with season ticket holders given refunds if working from home, and rail franchise agreements nationalised for at least six months to prevent rail companies from collapsing.
- In a televised address, Boris Johnson announces new strict rules applicable to the entire United Kingdom with the aim to slow the spread of the disease, by reducing transmission of the disease between different households. The British public are instructed that they must stay at home, except for certain "very limited purposes" – shopping for essential items (such as food and medicine); one form of outdoor exercise each day (such as running, walking or cycling), either alone or with others who live in the same household; for any medical need, or to provide care to a vulnerable person; and to travel to and from work where this is "absolutely necessary" and the work in question cannot be done from home. However, when these restrictions came into force on 26 March, the statutory instrument for England omitted any limit on the number of exercise sessions. All non-essential shops, libraries, places of worship, playgrounds and outdoor gyms are closed, and police are given powers to enforce the measures, including the use of fines.

==== 24 March ====
- The UK records its highest number of COVID-19 deaths in one day, after a further 87 people die across the country, bringing the total to 422.
- For the first time, all of the UK's mobile networks send out a government text alert. The message reads: "GOV.UK COVID-19 ALERT. New rules in force now: you must stay at home. More info and exemptions at gov.uk/COVID-19 Stay at home. Protect the NHS. Save lives."
- Health Secretary Matt Hancock announces the government will open a temporary hospital, the NHS Nightingale Hospital at the ExCeL London, to add extra critical care capacity in response to COVID-19 pandemic.
- The Church of England closes all its buildings.
- BBC News announces that it is delaying plans to cut 450 news jobs due to the pressure of covering the COVID-19 pandemic.

==== 25 March ====
- Prince Charles tests positive for COVID-19.
- Parliament shuts down for a month.
- British Transport Police deploys 500 officers to patrol the UK's rail network, in an effort to discourage non-essential journeys. New measures are also introduced on the London Underground to reduce passenger numbers.
- The police will be given the power to use "reasonable force" to enforce the lockdown regulations.
- The first two working NHS doctors die from COVID-19 on the same day, one a GP, the other a surgeon.
- The Contingencies Fund Act 2020 receives royal assent.

==== 26 March ====
- The Health Protection (COVID-19, Restrictions) (England) Regulations 2020 (SI 350) (the 'Lockdown Regulations') come into effect, significantly extending the range of businesses that are required by law to close with immediate effect including all retail businesses not on an approved list. These regulations also include significant restrictions on freedom of movement: "no person may leave the place where they are living without reasonable excuse".
- The number of UK COVID-19 deaths increases by more than 100 in a day for the first time, rising to 578, while a total of 11,568 have tested positive for the virus.
- The government announces that some self-employed will be paid 80% of profits, up to £2,500 a month, to help them cope during the economic crisis triggered by COVID-19.
- At 8pm, millions of people around the country take part in a "Clap for Carers" tribute, applauding the NHS and other care workers.
- The National Theatre launches National Theatre at Home, a two-month programme whereby a different production from its archives will be streamed for free each week. The project begins with Richard Bean's comedy One Man, Two Guvnors, featuring James Corden.

==== 27 March ====
- Prime Minister Boris Johnson and Health Secretary Matt Hancock both test positive for COVID-19. Johnson will self-isolate in 10 Downing Street and Hancock is self-isolating at home whilst working.
- Chief Medical Adviser Chris Whitty and Labour Party MP Angela Rayner, the Shadow Secretary of State for Education, also confirm they have been suffering symptoms and are self-isolating.
- Leon Restaurants sets up the "Feed NHS" initiative to deliver 5,600 free meals a day to NHS critical care staff at London hospitals.
- The 2020 Cambridge Folk Festival is cancelled.
- Dominic Cummings, Johnson's lead adviser, drives 250 miles to Durham with his wife and child. When this came to public notice in May, he explained that "there was nobody in London that [he] could reasonably ask to look after [his] child".

==== 28 March ====
- Alister Jack, the Secretary of State for Scotland, announces that he is self-isolating after experiencing COVID-19 symptoms.
- A further 260 deaths takes the number of fatalities past 1,000, with a total of 1,019 deaths having occurred so far; 17,089 people have tested positive.
- At 11pm, new regulations come into force in Northern Ireland giving authorities the power to force businesses to close, and impose fines on them if they refuse, as well as on people leaving their homes without a "reasonable excuse". The measures, introduced by the Northern Ireland Executive, bring Northern Ireland into line with the rest of the UK.

==== 29 March ====
- The government will send a letter to 30 million households warning things will "get worse before they get better" and that tighter restrictions could be implemented if necessary. The letter will also be accompanied by a leaflet setting out the government's lockdown rules along with health information.
- Dr Jenny Harries, England's deputy chief medical officer, suggests it could be six months before life can return to "normal", because social distancing measures will have to be reduced "gradually".
- The first NHS nurse dies of COVID-19.

==== 30 March ====
- As the number of reported deaths rises to 1,408, Patrick Vallance, the UK's chief scientific adviser, says there are early signs social distancing measures are "making a difference". Transmission of the virus within the community is thought to be decreasing, and hospital admission data suggests cases are not rising as fast as anticipated.
- Foreign Secretary Dominic Raab announces an arrangement between the government and major UK airlines to fly home tens of thousands of British nationals who are stranded abroad by COVID-19 outbreak.
- Dominic Cummings, the Prime Minister's Chief Adviser, is reported to be self-isolating after experiencing COVID-19 symptoms.
- Vehicle owners are granted a six-month exemption from MOT tests, enabling them to continue using their vehicles for essential travel.
- All Gatwick Express services are suspended until further notice on the grounds of significantly reduced demand for travel to Gatwick Airport.

==== 31 March ====
- A significant rise in anxiety and depression among the UK population is reported following the lockdown. The study, by researchers from the University of Sheffield and Ulster University, finds that people reporting anxiety increased from 17% to 36%, while those reporting depression increased from 16% to 38%.
- The number of people in hospital with COVID-19 passes 10,000.
- The largest UK daily death toll of the outbreak so far is reported, with 381 deaths taking the total to 1,789.

=== April 2020 ===
==== 1 April ====
- The UK government confirms that a total of 2,000 NHS staff have been tested for COVID-19 since the outbreak began, but Cabinet Office Minister Michael Gove says a shortage of chemical reagents needed for COVID-19 testing means it is not possible to screen the NHS's 1.2 million workforce. Gove's statement is contradicted by the Chemical Industries Association, which says there is not a shortage of the relevant chemicals and that at a meeting with a business minister the week before the government had not tried to find out about potential supply problems.
- The contactless payment limit for in-store spending is raised from £30 to £45.
- Multinational pharmaceutical company Roche denies the existence of a deal to supply Wales with COVID-19 tests after First Minister Mark Drakeford and Health Minister Vaughan Gething blame the shortage of testing kits on the collapse of a deal.
- The 2020 Wimbledon Championships, due to take place from 29 June 2020 to 12 July 2020 is cancelled for the first time since World War II. The rescheduled 2021 Wimbledon Championships took place from 28 June 2021 to 11 July 2021 instead.

==== 2 April ====
- Matt Hancock, who returns to give the daily government briefing after completing his self-isolation, sets a target of carrying out 100,000 tests a day by the end of the month (encompassing both swab tests and blood tests).
- The government writes off historical debts totalling £13.4bn of over 100 hospital trusts, an action which had been under consideration since before the onset of the pandemic.
- At 8pm the UK gives another national round of applause for NHS staff and other key workers.
- BBC sports presenter Gary Lineker announces that he is donating £140,000 to the British Red Cross towards research into COVID-19.

==== 3 April ====
- NHS Nightingale Hospital London, the first temporary hospital to treat COVID-19 patients, opens at the ExCel centre in East London, employing NHS staff and military personnel, with 500 beds and potential capacity for 4,000. It is the first of several such facilities planned across the UK.
- Figures published by the Cabinet Office indicate UK road traffic levels have fallen by 73% since the lockdown measures were introduced, and are at their lowest since 1955.
- With warm weather forecast for some areas during the upcoming weekend, Matt Hancock warns people to stay at home, telling them this is an instruction "not a request".
- The Queen holds the first virtual meeting with the Privy Council.

==== 4 April ====
- It is announced that a five-year-old has died from the virus, believed to be the youngest victim to date.
- The results of the 2020 Labour Party leadership election and the 2020 Labour Party deputy leadership election are announced, in which Keir Starmer is elected as the leader of the Labour Party, succeeding Jeremy Corbyn, and Angela Rayner is elected as deputy leader of the party. The results are released by email after a public event to announce the results was cancelled due to the pandemic.

==== 5 April ====
- Queen Elizabeth II makes a rare broadcast to the UK and the wider Commonwealth, something she has done on only four previous occasions. In the address she thanks people for following the government's social distancing rules, pays tribute to key workers, and says the UK "will succeed" in its fight against COVID-19 but may have "more still to endure".
- Prime Minister Boris Johnson is admitted to hospital for tests after testing positive for COVID-19 nine days earlier.
- Matt Hancock says the goal for the number of ventilators has been reduced to 18,000 and that the NHS has between 9,000 and 10,000 available.

==== 6 April ====
- The death toll from COVID-19 in the UK exceeds 5,000. The total number of reported cases is nearly 52,000.
- Prime Minister Boris Johnson is taken into intensive care at St Thomas' Hospital. It is announced that First Secretary of State Dominic Raab will deputise for him.
- National Express suspends all its long-distance coach services.

==== 7 April ====
- Patrick Vallance, the government's chief scientific adviser, says that the number of cases are not accelerating as had been predicted but that it is too early to tell whether the outbreak is peaking.

==== 8 April ====
- The Resolution Foundation, using figures from the British Chambers of Commerce, reports that more than nine million workers are expected to be furloughed under the government's job retention scheme, with an estimated cost to the taxpayer of between £30 and 40bn.

==== 9 April ====
- Dominic Raab says the UK is "starting to see the impact" of the restrictions but it is "too early" to lift them, and urges people to stay indoors over the upcoming Easter weekend. With warm weather forecast again for Easter, this message is echoed by police and tourist destinations. Johnson was moved out of intensive care, but remained in hospital.
- At 8pm the nation stages a third round of applause for NHS staff and other key workers.

==== 10 April ====
- Jonathan Van-Tam, England's deputy chief medical officer, tells the UK Government's daily briefing the lockdown is "beginning to pay off" but the UK is still in a "dangerous situation", and although cases in London have started to drop they are still rising in Yorkshire and the North East.
- Matt Hancock tells the briefing a "Herculean effort" is being made to ensure daily deliveries of personal protective equipment (PPE) to frontline workers, including the establishment of a domestic manufacturing industry to produce the equipment. Fifteen drive-through testing centres have also been opened around the UK to test frontline workers.

==== 11 April ====
- Queen Elizabeth II makes her first ever Easter message to the nation, in which she states "COVID-19 will not overcome us" and that "we need Easter as much as ever."
- After some NHS workers say they still do not have the correct personal protective equipment to treat patients, Home Secretary Priti Patel tells that day's Downing Street briefing she is "sorry if people feel there have been failings" in providing kit.
- The number of people in London hospitals for COVID-19 reaches its peak, according to week-on-week change data; elsewhere in the country, patient numbers continue to increase, although the rate of increase is slowing.
- Occupancy of critical care beds in England peaks at around 58% of capacity. Occupancy in the month of April for Scotland and Wales will only briefly exceed 40%, while Northern Ireland reported a peak of 51% early in the month.

==== 12 April ====
- Prime Minister Boris Johnson is discharged from hospital after being treated for COVID-19 and will continue his recovery at Chequers.
- The number of people who died in hospital with COVID-19 in the UK passes 10,000, after a daily rise of 737 to 10,612. Matt Hancock describes it as a "sombre day".

==== 13 April ====
- Dominic Raab tells the Downing Street briefing the government does not expect to make any immediate changes to the lockdown restrictions and that the UK's plan "is working [but] we are still not past the peak of this virus".

==== 14 April ====
- The Office for National Statistics indicates that COVID-19 was linked to one in five deaths during the week ending 3 April. More than 16,000 deaths in the UK were recorded for that week, 6,000 higher than would be the average for that time of year.
- Several UK charities, including Age UK and the Alzheimer's Society, express their concern that older people are being "airbrushed" out of official figures because they focus on hospital deaths and do not include those in care homes or a person's own home. Responding to these concerns, Therese Coffey, the Secretary of State for Work and Pensions, says that hospital figures are being used because "it's accurate and quick".
- Mobile operators report a further twenty attempted arson attacks on mobile phone masts over the previous weekend.

==== 15 April ====
- Health Secretary Matt Hancock announces new guidelines that will allow close family members to see dying relatives in order to say goodbye to them. Hancock also launches a new network to provide personal protective equipment to care home staff.
- The 2020 Love Supreme Jazz Festival, scheduled for July, is cancelled.

==== 16 April ====
- A 99-year-old war veteran, Tom Moore, completes 100 laps of his garden, eventually raising over £25 million for NHS Charities Together, with over a million people donating via his JustGiving page.
- Foreign Secretary Dominic Raab announces a three-week extension to the nationwide lockdown measures as the number of confirmed COVID-19 cases in the UK surpasses 100,000.
- The NHS Nightingale Hospital Birmingham, at the National Exhibition Centre, is officially opened by Prince William.
- The UK stages a fourth round of applause for NHS staff and key workers at 8pm.
- A spokesperson for Princess Beatrice of York and Edoardo Mapelli Mozzi confirms that their wedding, scheduled for 29 May, will be held on a later date.

==== 17 April ====
- Matt Hancock confirms COVID-19 tests will be rolled out to cover more public service staff such as police officers, firefighters and prison staff.
- Chancellor Rishi Sunak extends the subsidised wage scheme for furloughed workers for another month, to the end of June.
- Later analysis of death registrations (all causes) in England and Wales by the Office for National Statistics finds the highest total this week, which at 21,805 is 207% of the five-year average for the same week. COVID-19 is mentioned in 8,730 cases.

==== 18 April ====
- Imran Ahmad Khan, the MP for Wakefield, secures a shipment of 110,000 reusable face masks through his connections with charity Solidarités international and the Vietnamese Government for Mid Yorkshire Hospitals NHS Trust to help tackle the shortage of PPE.
- Unions representing doctors and nurses express their concern at a change in government guidelines advising medics to reuse gowns or wear other kit if stocks run low.
- Speaking at the Downing Street daily briefing, Robert Jenrick, the Communities Secretary, says a further 400,000 gowns will be arriving from Turkey the following day. (In the event, the shipment was delayed by several days, and was said on 7 May to be unusable).
- Care England, the UK's largest care homes representative body, estimates that as many as 7,500 care home residents may have died because of COVID-19, compared to the official figure of 1,400 released a few days earlier.
- Jenrick announces a further £1.6bn of support for local authorities, on top of £1.6bn that was given to them on 19 March.
- Jenrick says that the virus appears to be having a "disproportionate impact" on the Black, Asian and minority ethnic (BAME) communities, while Stephen Powis says he has asked Public Health England to investigate what may be accounting for the increased risk within these groups.
- Jenrick says that parks and cemeteries must remain open during the lockdown.

==== 19 April ====
- The number of recorded deaths increases by 596 to 16,060, a lower increase than previous days. Dr Jenny Harries says the lower number of deaths is "very good news" but cautions against drawing conclusions from the figures.
- After a Sunday Times article suggests schools could reopen on 11 May, Gavin Williamson, the Secretary of State for Education, tells the Downing Street daily briefing he cannot give a date for when this will happen, and that the focus will be on helping children to learn at home, with lessons made available online and free loans of laptops for disadvantaged children.
- BBC One airs a UK version of the Together at Home concert, a virtual global concert staged to celebrate healthcare workers and featuring musicians playing from home. The two-hour broadcast includes highlights of the US version and features stories of frontline workers along with extra footage of British artists.

==== 20 April ====
- Online applications for COVID-19 Job Retention Scheme are opened, with 67,000 claims registered in the first 30 minutes.
- NHS Blood and Transplant asks those who have survived COVID-19 to donate blood for trials of a treatment that will involve giving the blood plasma of survivors to patients ill in hospital with the disease.
- Prof Dame Angela Maclean, the UK's deputy chief scientific adviser, says the number of confirmed cases is "flattening out". The number of people in hospital for COVID-19 has begun to fall in Scotland, Wales and every region of England, with significant falls in London and the Midlands.

==== 21 April ====
- A further 823 deaths are recorded, taking the total to 17,337, a sharp rise on the previous day, but many of these relate to deaths that occurred in previous days and weeks, and some date back as far as March. Prof Sir David Spiegelhalter, of the University of Cambridge, says the figures suggest the UK is past the peak and in a "steadily" albeit slowly improving position.
- Figures released by the Office for National Statistics indicate deaths in England and Wales have reached a twenty year high, with 18,500 deaths from all causes in the week up to 10 April, about 8,000 more than the average for that time of year. The deaths include those in care homes, where the 1,043 year-to-date deaths related to COVID-19 is a jump from the 217 reported a week ago.
- Matt Hancock says the government is "throwing everything" at developing a vaccine as he announces £42.5m for clinical trials being conducted by Imperial College London and the University of Oxford.
- Parliament reconvenes after the Easter recess with MPs approving a new arrangement with some in the House of Commons chamber and some attending via video link.
- Fundraiser Captain Tom Moore is the guest of honour at the opening of NHS Nightingale Hospital Yorkshire and the Humber in Harrogate.

==== 22 April ====
- The Health Protection (COVID-19, Restrictions) (England) (Amendment) Regulations 2020 (SI 447) come into effect, correcting errors in the original lockdown regulations and allowing some visits to burial grounds and gardens of remembrance.
- Figures show that UK inflation fell to 1.5% in March, largely because of falls in the price of clothing and fuel ahead of the lockdown.
- Parliament holds the first virtual Prime Minister's Questions with Dominic Raab standing in for Boris Johnson, at which Raab confirms the target of 100,000 tests a day by the end of the month.
- In a Commons statement Matt Hancock tells MPs "we are at the peak" of the outbreak but social distancing measures cannot be relaxed until the government's five tests have been met. Professor Chris Whitty, the government's chief medical adviser, tells the Downing Street briefing the UK will have to live with some social distancing measures for at least the rest of the year, and that it is "wholly unrealistic" to expect life to suddenly return to normal in the short term.

==== 23 April ====
- The first human trials of a COVID-19 vaccine in Europe begin in Oxford.
- A study involving 20,000 households in England, coordinated by the Office for National Statistics, will track the progress of COVID-19 and seek to better understand infection and immunity levels, with volunteers asked to provide nose and throat swabs on a regular basis to determine whether they have the virus.
- Matt Hancock states that daily test capacity has reached 51,000, and announces that all key workers and members of their households are now eligible for COVID-19 tests and will be able to book tests through the government website from the following day. Tests will be conducted at drive-through centres or using home testing kits, while mobile testing units operated by the armed forces would increase in number from the present eight to 92, with a further four operated by civilians in Northern Ireland.
- Hancock also announces preparations to reactivate contact tracing in a later phase of the outbreak, including the recruitment of 18,000 contact tracers to greatly supplement Public Health England's staff.
- DIY chain B&Q confirms it has reopened 155 of its stores following a trial opening of a small number of outlets the previous weekend.
- BBC One airs The Big Night In, a first-of-its-kind joint broadcast with Children in Need and Comic Relief, and featuring an evening of music and entertainment. The broadcast celebrates the acts of kindness, humour and the spirit of hope and resilience that is keeping the nation going during the unprecedented COVID-19 pandemic, with viewers given a chance to donate to a fund helping local charities and projects around the country. The event raises £27m for charity, with the government pledging to double that amount.
- At 8pm the UK stages a fifth round of applause for NHS staff and key workers.

==== 24 April ====
- The website for key workers to book a COVID-19 test temporarily closes after a high demand for the tests; 5,000 test kits are ordered within its first two minutes online. The government says it will make more tests available.
- Transport Secretary Grant Shapps announces bilateral discussions with the Irish and French governments to safeguard freight routes, and with the Northern Ireland Executive regarding support for passenger flights. Funding is to be provided to support ferry routes to Northern Ireland, the Isle of Wight and the Isles of Scilly.
- A version of "You'll Never Walk Alone" recorded by Captain Tom Moore and Michael Ball to raise money for the NHS Charities Together fund reaches number one in the UK Singles Chart.

==== 25 April ====
- The number of recorded deaths increases by 813, taking the total past 20,000 to 20,319. Thus the UK becomes the fifth country to pass the 20,000 mark along with the United States, Italy, Spain and France.
- After figures show that A&E attendances are half their usual level, the health service urges people to seek healthcare if needed and not be put off by COVID-19 outbreak.
- COVID-19 tests for key workers are booked up within an hour.
- Guernsey partially lifts its lockdown restrictions, allowing gardeners, mechanics, estate agents and builders to return to work.

==== 26 April ====
- The figure of 413 recorded deaths is the lowest daily total in April.
- Professor Stephen Powis tells the Downing Street daily briefing the benefit of social distancing is beginning to be felt, with the stabilisation of the number of new cases, and a reduction of the number of people in hospital.

==== 27 April ====
- In his first public statement since returning to work, Boris Johnson says the UK is "at the moment of maximum risk" but "we are now beginning to turn the tide" as he urges people not to lose patience with the restrictions.
- The government announces that the families of NHS and care workers who die because of COVID-19 will be entitled to a payment of £60,000.
- The number of recorded deaths from COVID-19 rises by 360, taking the total to 21,092. This is the lowest daily rise for four weeks.

==== 28 April ====
- Figures from the Office for National Statistics for the week ending 17 April show 22,351 deaths registered in England and Wales, nearly double the five-year average and the highest weekly total since comparable records began in 1993.
- The ONS report indicates a third of COVID-19 deaths in England and Wales are occurring in care homes, with 2,000 recorded in the week ending 17 April, and the number of deaths from all causes in care homes is almost three times the number recorded three weeks ago.
- Matt Hancock announces that care home figures will be included in the daily death toll from the following day; official figures have previously included only hospital data.
- Testing capacity reaches 73,000 per day, although only 43,000 were carried out the previous day. Matt Hancock announces that testing will be expanded from the following day to include all care home workers, and people (and their family members) with symptoms who must leave home for their job or are aged over 65.
- At 11am the UK holds a minute's silence to remember key workers who have died from COVID-19.

==== 29 April ====
- Speaking to the House of Commons Education Select Committee, Gavin Williamson, the Secretary of State for Education says that the reopening of schools will take place in a "phased manner".
- Official figures begin including deaths in care homes and the community, resulting in the number of recorded deaths increasing by 4,419 to 26,097. Dominic Raab tells the Downing Street daily briefing the figures have been included retrospectively, and account for care home and community deaths between 2 March and 28 April. In the most recent 24-hour period there have been 765 deaths.

==== 30 April ====
- Prime Minister Boris Johnson says the UK is "past the peak" of the COVID-19 outbreak but that the country must not "risk a second spike", and announces that he will set out "comprehensive plan" for easing the lockdown "next week". He also stresses the importance of keeping down the reproductive rate, which "is going to be absolutely vital to our recovery".
- Captain Tom Moore celebrates his 100th birthday, and is made an honorary colonel by the Queen. His appeal to raise money for the NHS reaches £32m.
- At 8pm the UK stages its weekly round of applause for NHS staff and key workers.
- ITV announces plans to resume filming live studio-based shows such as Britain's Got Talent and The Masked Singer, but without the presence of an audience.
- The British Library is to archive hundreds of essays submitted to BBC Radio 4's PM programme by listeners detailing their COVID-19 experiences. The Covid Chronicles, launched in March, has seen listeners submit their accounts of their lives during the lockdown restrictions, some of which have been broadcast.

=== May 2020 ===
==== 1 May ====
- Matt Hancock confirms the government's target of providing (but not necessarily completing) 100,000 tests a day by the end of April has been met, with 122,347 provided over the previous 24 hours.
- Hancock announces that fertility clinics will be allowed to open again from 11 May.
- "Times Like These", a charity single by the Live Lounge Allstars released to raise funds for those affected by the pandemic, reaches number one in the UK Singles Chart.
- Facebook deletes the account of conspiracy theorist David Icke for posting misinformation about the COVID-19 pandemic, including claims it is being spread by the 5G network.

==== 2 May ====
- Robert Jenrick announces £76m of funding to help vulnerable people, including children, victims of domestic violence and modern slavery, who may be "trapped in a nightmare" during the lockdown restrictions.
- YouTube becomes the latest social media platform to remove David Icke's official account.

==== 3 May ====
- In an interview with the Sun on Sunday, Boris Johnson speaks about how contingency plans were made for the event of his death while he was in intensive care.
- An NHS contact tracing app designed to track and prevent the spread of COVID-19 will be trialled on the Isle of Wight during the forthcoming week.

==== 4 May ====
- Apple and Google approve a test version of the NHS tracing app.
- Businessman Simon Dolan announces that he will seek a court injunction to lift the lockdown in Britain.

==== 5 May ====
- The number of recorded deaths rises by 693 to 29,427, giving the UK the highest number of COVID-19 related deaths in Europe.
- Figures from the Office for National Statistics for the week ending 24 April show 21,997 deaths from all causes registered in England and Wales; this is a decrease of 354 from the previous week but still nearly twice the five-year average for the time of year. Deaths per week in hospital are falling while those in care homes continue to increase, and for the year to 24 April, 5,890 deaths in care homes involved COVID-19.
- Trials of the NHS contact-tracing app start on the Isle of Wight with the app being made available to healthcare and council workers.
- NHS Nightingale Hospital North East, a temporary critical care hospital built near Sunderland for COVID-19 patients, is officially opened by Health Secretary Matt Hancock. The virtual ceremony features TV celebrities Ant and Dec, football pundit Alan Shearer and cricketer Ben Stokes.
- Figures from the Society of Motor Manufacturers and Traders (SMMT) indicate just 4,321 new cars were registered in April, the lowest monthly number since 1946 and a 97% fall on sales from April 2019; 70% of new cars for the month were company fleet vehicles.
- Airline operator Virgin Atlantic announces it has shed more than 3,000 jobs and ended operations at Gatwick Airport as a result of the COVID-19 outbreak, as well as withdrawing all their Boeing 747 fleet.
- Sir Patrick Vallance tells the House of Commons Health Select Committee earlier testing for COVID-19 would have been "beneficial" but would not have prevented the spread of the virus.
- Professor Neil Ferguson, whose advice led the government to implement the lockdown restrictions, resigns from the Scientific Advisory Group for Emergencies after the Daily Telegraph reports a woman named as his "married lover" visited his home during the restrictions.

==== 6 May ====
- At his first Prime Minister's Questions since returning to work Boris Johnson says he "bitterly regrets" the crisis in care homes and is "working very hard" to tackle it. Johnson also pledges to reach a target of 200,000 daily UK COVID-19 tests by the end of May.
- A further 649 deaths take the number of recorded deaths over 30,000, to 30,076.
- John Holland-Kaye, the CEO of Heathrow Airport, tells the Transport Select Committee that the airport is trialling large-scale temperature checks at departure gates.

==== 7 May ====
- The government confirms that 400,000 gowns ordered from Turkey to protect NHS staff from COVID-19 have been impounded, after failing to meet the required safety standards.
- The Bank of England warns that the economy is on course to shrink by 14% in 2020 because of the impact of COVID-19, pushing the UK into its deepest recession on record.
- Baroness Dido Harding, chair of NHS Improvement and former CEO of TalkTalk, is appointed to lead the government's programme of testing and tracing, supported by John Newton of Public Health England. Testing will be led by Sarah-Jane Marsh, chief executive of Birmingham Women's and Children's Hospitals, and tracing will be led by Tom Riordan, chief executive of Leeds City Council.
- The UK stages another round of applause for NHS staff and key workers, the seventh to be held on consecutive Thursdays at 8pm.

==== 8 May ====
- The death of a six-week-old baby is reported.
- With the UK beginning another Bank Holiday weekend, Environment Secretary George Eustice urges the public to abide by the rules of the lockdown restrictions and warns people have to be "realistic" about the loosening of the measures.

==== 9 May ====
- Transport Secretary Grant Shapps announces £2bn of investment to improve walking and cycling, describing it as a chance for a "once in a generation change" to the way the public travels.

==== 10 May ====
- The UK government updates its COVID-19 message from "stay at home, protect the NHS, save lives" to "stay alert, control the virus, save lives". The Opposition Labour Party expresses concern the slogan could be confusing, and leaders of the devolved governments in Scotland, Wales and Northern Ireland say they will keep the original slogan.
- A new alert scale system is announced, ranging from green (level one) to red (level five), similar to the UK's Terror Threat Levels.
- A recorded address by Boris Johnson is broadcast at 7pm in which he outlines a "conditional plan" to reopen society, but says it is "not the time simply to end the lockdown this week", and describes the plans as "the first careful steps to modify our measures". Those who cannot work from home, such as construction workers and those in manufacturing, are encouraged to return to work from the following day, but to avoid public transport if possible. The guidance on the number of outdoor exercise periods will be lifted from Wednesday 13 May.
- Outlining future easing of restrictions, Johnson says "step two" – no sooner than 1 June – would include reopening some shops and the return of primary school pupils, beginning with reception, Year 1 and Year 6; and that secondary pupils facing exams next year would get some time in school before the summer holiday. "Step three" – at the earliest by July – would begin the reopening of the hospitality industry and other public places. Johnson also says that passengers arriving into the UK on international flights (apart from those from the Republic of Ireland) will soon be asked to go into quarantine for fourteen days.

COVID-19 alert level system
Level	Meaning
5	As level 4 and there is a material risk of healthcare services being overwhelmed
4	A COVID-19 epidemic is in general circulation; transmission is high or rising exponentially
3	A COVID-19 epidemic is in general circulation
2	COVID-19 is present in the UK, but the number of cases and transmission is low
1	COVID-19 no longer present in the UK

==== 11 May ====
- The UK government publishes a 50-page document setting out further details of the phases for lifting the lockdown restrictions. Boris Johnson gives further details as he makes his first statement on the virus to Parliament.
- Amid concerns about the safety of people returning to work, Johnson tells the Downing Street daily briefing he is not expecting a "sudden big flood" of people returning to work, and that companies will have to prove they have introduced safety measures before they can reopen.
- The UK government advises people in England to wear face coverings in enclosed spaces where social distancing is not possible, such as on public transport and in shops.
- Air passengers arriving on flights from France will also be exempt from new quarantine rules.
- Sir David Norgrove, chair of the UK Statistics Authority, writes to Matt Hancock seeking clarity on the targets for the number of tests, and the reporting of the number carried out each day.
- Teaching unions express their concern at government plans to reopen schools on 1 June, describing them as "reckless" and unsafe.
- Fertility clinics can apply to the Human Fertilisation and Embryology Authority to re-open.

==== 12 May ====
- Figures released by the Office for National Statistics and the devolved administrations indicate the death toll from COVID-19 exceeds 40,000 – including almost 11,000 care home residents – although week-by-week numbers continue to fall. In care homes in England and Wales, the year-to-date COVID-19 total reaches 8,312 but the weekly number (to 1 May) shows a decrease for the first time since the start of the pandemic.
- Chancellor Rishi Sunak extends the UK's furlough scheme until October, with employees continuing to receive 80% of their monthly wages up to £2,500. A quarter of the workforce, some 7.5 million people, are now covered by the scheme, costing £14bn a month.

==== 13 May ====
- The Health Protection (COVID-19, Restrictions) (England) (Amendment No. 2) Regulations 2020 (SI 500) come into effect, allowing the re-opening of garden centres, sports courts and recycling centres. In addition to outdoor exercise, open-air recreation is also permitted with no more than one member of another household. Government announcements gloss these with the (non-enforceable) requirement that social distancing must be practised. House moves and viewings are also permitted.
- After figures indicate the UK economy shrank by 2% in the first three months of 2020 and is shrinking at the fastest rate since the late 2000s global recession, Chancellor Rishi Sunak says it is "very likely" the country is in a "significant recession".
- Creamfields, scheduled for 27–30 August, announces the cancellation of the 2020 edition due to the pandemic.

==== 14 May ====
- A total of 126,064 tests for COVID-19 have been conducted in the most recent 24 hour period, the highest number to date.
- Figures compiled by NHS England giving a breakdown of underlying health conditions among COVID-19 hospital fatalities between 31 March and 12 May indicate one in four had diabetes. Other common health conditions were dementia (18%), serious breathing problems (15%), chronic kidney disease (14%), and ischaemic heart disease (10%).
- The Office for National Statistics publishes results of the early phase of a survey programme in England. From swab tests between 27 April and 10 May, they estimate that 148,000 people, or 0.27% of the population, had COVID-19 at any given time during those two weeks (95% confidence interval: 94,000 to 222,000). This implies roughly 10,000 new cases per day. No significant difference is found between broad age groups. Their estimate for people working in healthcare or social care is higher, at 1.33% (confidence interval: 0.39% to 3.28%). The survey does not include people in hospital or care homes, where rates of infection are likely to be higher still.
- Public Health England approves a blood test developed by Roche Diagnostics that can detect COVID-19 antibodies.
- The Office for Budget Responsibility forecasts the cost to government of combating COVID-19 pandemic has risen to £123.2bn, with annual borrowing estimated to be 15.2% of the UK economy. This figure is the highest annual borrowing since the end of World War II when it stood at 22.1%.
- The BBC announces plans to resume the filming of EastEnders and Top Gear in June, with cast and crew practising social distancing, and doing their own hair and makeup.
- The UK stages its eighth Clap for Our Carers event at 8pm.

==== 15 May ====
- Boris Johnson allegedly attends a party in Downing Street.
- Government scientific advice says that the R number has increased slightly from between 0.5 and 0.9 to between 0.7 and 1.0, closer to the rate at which infections could start to exponentially increase. The figures are said to be "consistent with" the fall in cases in the community and the rise of cases in care homes, but are based on data from three weeks previously, so the effect of easing the lockdown measures is unknown.
- Government scientists and teaching unions hold talks in a bid to safely reopen schools. The British Medical Association voices its support for the unions over their concerns about the safety of resuming classes.
- The places of worship task force, a body consisting of leading members of faith groups and government representatives, has its inaugural meeting. The group was established in response to Boris Johnson's 10 May address, in which he said religious buildings could reopen by 4 July, and aims to examine how this can happen safely.

==== 16 May ====
- Anne Longfield, the Children's Commissioner for England, urges the government and teaching unions to "stop squabbling and agree a plan" to reopen schools, warning that the closure of schools is negatively affecting disadvantaged children.
- COVID-19 protests involving the gathering of people are held at venues around the UK, including Hyde Park in London, and Glasgow Green in Glasgow.

==== 17 May ====
- In an article for The Mail on Sunday, Boris Johnson acknowledges frustrations with the government's "stay alert" message for England, but urges the public to be patient as the lockdown measures are eased.
- The number of recorded deaths rises by 170 to 34,636. The daily increase is the lowest since the day after the lockdown restrictions were introduced.
- At the Downing Street daily briefing, Business Secretary Alok Sharma announces a further £84m of funding to help mass-produce a COVID-19 vaccine being trialled by the University of Oxford and that should be available by September. He also tells the briefing that Oxford have secured an agreement with pharmaceutical company AstraZeneca to manufacture the vaccine, and distributed it to the UK first.

==== 18 May ====
- Rail operators begin running more train services, while security guards trained in crowd control are placed on duty at some major railway stations.
- Jury trials resume at a handful of courts in England and Wales, having been suspended since the beginning of the lockdown restrictions.
- The UK adds loss of smell and loss of taste to the list of COVID-19 symptoms that people should look out for.
- Health Secretary Matt Hancock announces that anyone in the UK over the age of five with symptoms can now be tested for COVID-19.
- Matt Hancock also confirms that 21,000 contact tracers have been recruited across the UK and are ready to begin work.
- Foreign Secretary Dominic Raab tells the Downing Street daily briefing that it is “not sustainable” to keep the lockdown in place “permanently” but that the Government is monitoring the changes it makes.

==== 19 May ====
- Figures from the Office for National Statistics show the number of people claiming Jobseeker's Allowance increased by 856,500 in April, to 2.1 million. In response to this Chancellor Rishi Sunak says that it will take time for the UK economy to recover and it is "not obvious there will be an immediate bounceback".
- As figures show there have been 11,600 deaths in care homes as a result of COVID-19, Professor Martin Green, chair of Care England, criticises the government for the way it handled the outbreak in care homes, and tells MPs they should have been prioritised from the start.
- Security researchers identify major security issues with the NHS COVID-19 tracing app being piloted on the Isle of Wight, and call for new legislation to prevent officials using the data collected for purposes other than identifying those at risk from the virus.
- Captain Tom Moore, who raised £32m for NHS charities, is to be knighted for his fundraising efforts following a special nomination from Boris Johnson.

==== 20 May ====
- At Prime Minister's Questions, Boris Johnson confirms that a track and trace system will be in place from 1 June.
- The Government faces mounting pressure from councils and teaching unions to reconsider its plans to reopen primary schools from 1 June. Robert Buckland, the Secretary of State for Justice, says the Government is taking all concerns "very seriously".
- Rolls-Royce announce plans to cut 9,000 jobs as a result of the COVID-19 outbreak, and warns that it could take several years for the airline industry to recover.
- The number of people in hospital with COVID-19 drops below 10,000 for the first time since March.
- People with diabetes are being strongly advised to follow government advice after a study by NHS England found the condition was linked to a third of COVID-19 deaths between 1 March and 11 May. Diabetics are not among the people who have been told to shield themselves, but some may be asked to do so if they are deemed to be at high risk because of a combination of health conditions.
- At the Downing Street daily briefing, Secretary of State for Digital, Culture, Media and Sport Oliver Dowden announces the establishment of a task force that will look at how sporting and arts events can resume safely. The task force will include former women's footballer Alex Scott and television executive Michael Grade.
- Dowden announces that £150m from dormant bank accounts will be used to help charities and social enterprises.
- The 2020 Queen's Birthday Honours is delayed until the autumn in order to recognise the "everyday Covid heroes" who have played a role in supporting and protecting society during the crisis.
- Figures released by Public Health England indicate no new COVID-19 cases were reported in London over the 24-hour period up to Monday 18 May.

==== 21 May ====
- The NHS Confederation warns that time is running out to finalise a test, track and trace strategy to avoid a possible second surge in COVID-19 cases.
- Following an agreement between the Government and the Swiss pharmaceutical company Roche, a COVID-19 antibody test is made available through the NHS, with health and care staff to be the first to receive it. The test checks to see if someone has had the virus.
- The Government announces that NHS staff and care workers from overseas will be exempt from the immigration health surcharge that usually applies to non-EU migrants.
- The Office for National Statistics estimate that 137,000 people in England, or 0.25% of the population, had COVID-19 at any given time between 4 May and 17 May (excluding those in hospitals, care homes or other institutions). This implies around 8,700 new infections per day, compared to the 10,000 estimate made two weeks ago.
- ITV announces that its soap Emmerdale has started a "phased return to filming" with six new episodes being recorded at its studios in Leeds.
- The UK stages its ninth weekly Clap for Our Carers event at 8pm.

==== 22 May ====
- The Government unveils new quarantine rules for travellers to the UK that will require them to self-isolate for fourteen days from 8 June.
- The Scientific Advisory Group for Emergencies publishes its evidence on the safety and impact of reopening schools on 1 June. It says the risk to school pupils is "very, very small, but it is not zero", while the risk to teachers is not above average when compared to other occupations.
- The Office for National Statistics reports that government borrowing rose to £62bn in April, the highest monthly figure on record, after heavy spending to ease COVID-19 crisis.
- Guernsey announces plans to move to Stage Four of its lockdown restrictions from 30 May, six weeks earlier than originally planned. This will allow restaurants and cafes, hairdressers and beauticians, cinemas, gyms and sports venues to reopen. The announcement comes after the island had 22 consecutive days with no new COVID-19 cases. Schools on the island will also reopen for all students on 8 June.
- Annemarie Plas, credited as starting the weekly Clap for Our Carers, suggests it should end after its tenth week as the public have shown their appreciation, and should instead become an annual celebration of frontline workers.

==== 23 May ====
- The French Government announces that travellers to France from the UK will have to quarantine for 14 days from 8 June.
- The death of a 12-year-old child is reported.
- Dominic Cummings, Boris Johnson's chief political adviser, comes under mounting pressure to resign after a joint investigation by the Daily Mirror and The Guardian reported that he travelled 260 miles from London to Durham to self-isolate during lockdown. In response to the story, Downing Street says that Cummings travelled to the north east to be near relatives who could look after his young son if he became ill himself.
- Transport Secretary Grant Shapps announces £283m of investment in buses and light rail services in order to help improve safety, but warns capacity will be at a fifth of pre-lockdown levels because of social distancing measures. Extra martials at stations from 1 June are also announced, as well as permission for ten rail reopening projects to proceed to make business cases under the "reversing the Beeching cuts" initiative.

==== 24 May ====
- After The Observer and the Sunday Mirror print allegations that Dominic Cummings made a second trip to the north east during lockdown, Boris Johnson gives his chief aide his backing at the Downing Street daily briefing, saying that Cummings had "no alternative" but to travel for childcare "when both he and his wife were about to be incapacitated by COVID-19" and has "acted responsibly, legally and with integrity". Johnson describes some of the claims as "palpably false".
- Johnson also confirms plans (outlined on 10 May) for the phased reopening of schools in England from 1 June: from that date, they will reopen for early years pupils, Reception, Year 1 and Year 6. For the first time he states that from 15 June a quarter of Year 10 and Year 12 students will be allowed "some contact" to help prepare for exams.

==== 25 May ====
- Dominic Cummings says "I don't regret what I did" as he gives a detailed explanation of his actions during lockdown at a press conference in the Downing Street Rose Garden.
- Education Secretary Gavin Williamson warns the virus "could be with us for a year or more" and children cannot stay off school for "months and months".

==== 26 May ====
- For the first day since 18 March, no new COVID deaths are reported in Northern Ireland. Robin Swann, the Northern Ireland Health Minister, describes it as "a clear sign of progress".
- Death registration figures for the week ending 15 May show the lowest number of COVID-19 deaths since the beginning of April.
- Remdesivir, a drug that can speed up the recovery time of patients with COVID-19, is made available through the NHS.
- Douglas Ross resigns as a junior minister with the Scotland Office over the UK government's defence of Dominic Cummings, while at least 35 Conservative MPs call for Cummings to be removed from his post.
- Tate Britain announces that the annual Turner Prize will not be awarded in 2020 because of the upheaval created by the COVID outbreak.

==== 27 May ====
- Boris Johnson states that a test and trace system will be operational in England from the following day.
- Johnson appears before the House of Commons Liaison Committee where he rules out holding an inquiry into the actions of Dominic Cummings.
- Figures from HM Treasury indicate COVID-19 Job Retention Scheme for furloughed workers in the UK now covers 8.4 million people, an increase from 8 million a week earlier.

==== 28 May ====
- Contact tracing systems go live in England and Scotland – NHS Test and Trace in England, and Test and Protect in Scotland. However, Dido Harding tells MPs the system in England will not be "fully operational at a local level" until the end of June.
- The weekly household survey by the Office for National Statistics reports that around 133,000 people in England had COVID-19 at any given time during 11–24 May, and estimates the rate of new infections to be around 54,000 per week. Both numbers are similar to the previous estimates, indicating that the number of infections is "relatively stable".
- A meeting of the four national Chief Medical Officers decides that the alert level should remain at 4, although Boris Johnson had said the previous day that he hoped it would come down to 3.
- Durham Police say that Dominic Cummings may have made a "minor breach" of lockdown rules during his visit to Barnard Castle, but no offence was committed.
- EasyJet announces plans to cut 4,500 jobs because of the effects of the COVID-19 outbreak on business.
- The tenth and final Clap for Our Carers event is staged at 8pm.

==== 29 May ====
- Chancellor Rishi Sunak announces that COVID-19 Job Retention Scheme will end at the end of October. Before then, employers must pay National Insurance and pension contributions from August, then 10% of pay from September, increasing to 20% in October. Self-employed people whose work has been affected by the outbreak will receive a "second and final" government grant in August.

==== 30 May ====
- Some government scientific advisers warn of the risk associated with lifting lockdown restrictions in England too early, citing the still high number of cases and deaths. In response the government says it is following the data and evidence when making its decisions about the restrictions. Professor Jonathan Van-Tam tells the Downing Street briefing that Britain is at a "dangerous moment" and people must be "sensible and proportionate".
- At the Downing Street daily briefing Culture Secretary Oliver Dowden announces that competitive sport will be allowed in England behind closed doors from 1 June, with individual sporting bodies left to decide when to restart. Horse racing will be one of the first sporting activities to resume.
- Conservative MPs urge Boris Johnson to revise the 2 metre social distancing rule to 1.5 metres amid concerns for the hospitality industry.

==== 31 May ====
- The UK exceeds its target to increase testing capacity to 200,000 tests a day by the end of May, with 205,634 available for 30 May.

=== June 2020 ===
==== 1 June ====
- The Health Protection (COVID-19, Restrictions) (England) (Amendment No. 3) Regulations 2020 (SI 558) come into effect, again without prior parliamentary scrutiny. Car and caravan showrooms, outdoor sports amenities and outdoor non-food markets may reopen. The prohibitions on leaving home are replaced by a prohibition on staying overnight away from home, with certain specific exceptions. Gatherings of people from more than one household are limited to six people outdoors and are prohibited entirely indoors, with exceptions including education. There are further exemptions for elite athletes.

==== 2 June ====
- Figures from the Office for National Statistics show the number of COVID-19 deaths to be at their lowest since March, with 2,872 death certificates mentioning the condition during the week up to 22 May.
- The Guardian has calculated the UK death toll from COVID-19 is 50,032. Meanwhile, Reuters give the figure as 49,646.
- David Norgrove, chair of the UK Statistics Authority, rebukes Matt Hancock in an escalation of his 11 May criticism of the government's handling of testing data, saying the figures are "still far from complete and comprehensible" and appear to be aimed at showing "the largest possible number of tests, even at the expense of understanding".
- MPs vote to end the practice of voting from home, but some politicians criticise the move for excluding those unable to attend Parliament due to age or health reasons. In response, Jacob Rees-Mogg, the Leader of the House, says he will schedule a motion for the following day that will enable them to question the government but not to vote.
- Water companies urge people to conserve water during the lockdown restrictions by not using sprinklers and hosepipes, or filling paddling pools. The advice follows a record dry spring coupled with more people spending time at home.
- The Royal Shakespeare Company announces it has called off performances planned for the summer, autumn and winter because of the COVID-19 outbreak.
- The England and Wales Cricket Board confirms England will play three test matches against the West Indies starting on 8 July.
- The UK government is to scale back its daily Downing Street briefings to weekdays only, citing low viewing figures at weekends. Boris Johnson will also commit to leading one briefing per week.

==== 3 June ====
- Home Secretary Priti Patel confirms plans to introduce a 14-day quarantine for new arrivals into the UK. Those who break the quarantine conditions in England will face fines of £1,000 and potential prosecution.
- Business Secretary Alok Sharma is tested for COVID-19 and self-isolates at home after looking visibly ill during a House of Commons debate. He subsequently tests negative for the virus.
- As the UK begins a period of wetter weather, Boris Johnson urges people not to move gatherings indoors if it rains.

==== 4 June ====
- Debenhams announces plans to reopen three stores in Northern Ireland from 8 June, followed by 50 in England a week later.
- Research by King's College London has suggested that half the UK population has struggled with sleep during lockdown.

==== 5 June ====
- The number of recorded deaths passes 40,000 after rising by 357 to 40,261.
- The British Medical Association urge the UK government to extend the rules regarding the wearing of face covering to all situations where social distancing is not possible.
- Sir Patrick Vallance, the UK's Government Chief Scientific Adviser, says the R number is between 0.7 and 0.9, but could be as high as 1 in some areas of England. His comments come after figures from the Office for National Statistics suggest the reproductive rate is between 0.7 and 1 for England.
- The weekly household survey by the Office for National Statistics reports that around 53,000 people (95% confidence: 25,000 to 99,000) in England had COVID-19 at any given time during 17–30 May, and estimates the rate of new infections to be around 39,000 per week, down from 54,000 the previous week. Their estimates are based on small numbers: 21 positive results from just under 20,000 swab tests.
- The UK government's ban on tenant evictions in England and Wales is extended by two months to 23 August.
- Health Secretary Matt Hancock urges people not to breach lockdown rules by attending protests planned for the forthcoming weekend. Several are planned by the organisation Black Lives Matter following the murder of George Floyd in the United States.

==== 6 June ====
- Anti-racism demonstrations are held in cities across the UK; attendees are reported to be in the thousands.
- Robert Jenrick announces that places of worship will be allowed to open for individual prayer on 15 June.

==== 7 June ====
- No new deaths are recorded for Scotland or Northern Ireland over the most recent 24 hour period; it is the first time Scotland has recorded no new deaths since lockdown began in March.
- Thousands of protesters take part in a second day of anti-racism demonstrations in cities across the UK.
- Professor John Edmunds, one of the scientists advising the UK government, says he wishes the lockdown had been implemented earlier as the delay "cost a lot of lives", but adds that data was "really quite poor", making it "very hard" to do act earlier. Responding to the comments, Health Secretary Matt Hancock says the government "took the right decision at the right time".

==== 8 June ====
- Rules requiring travellers arriving into the UK to quarantine for 14 days come into force.
- The number of recorded deaths rises by 55 to 40,597, the lowest daily number since lockdown was introduced on 23 March; no deaths are reported in Scotland for a second consecutive day, and there are no new deaths in London hospitals.
- BP announces plans to shed 10,000 jobs amid a global drop in demand for oil.

==== 9 June ====
- Business Secretary Alok Sharma confirms that all non-essential retailers in England can reopen from Monday 15 June providing they follow safety guidelines. However, pubs, bars, restaurants and hairdressers must wait until 4 July "at the earliest" to reopen. Prime Minister Boris Johnson announces that zoos and safari parks will also reopen on 15 June.
- Figures released by the Treasury show that 8.9 million workers are now covered by COVID-19 Job Retention Scheme, a quarter of the UK workforce, with it having cost £19.6bn to date.
- Thirty medical organisations that represent black, Asian and minority ethnic doctors and nurses write to Health Secretary Matt Hancock and Equalities Minister Kemi Badenoch expressing their concern at a government review that found black, Asian and ethnic minority people are twice as likely to die from COVID-19.

==== 10 June ====
- Professor Neil Ferguson, the government scientist whose advice was crucial in persuading the government to implement the lockdown measures, says that half of the lives lost to COVID-19 could have been saved if the measures had been introduced a week earlier.

==== 11 June ====
- Health Secretary Matt Hancock describes participation with the Test and Trace programme as a "civic duty".
- Figures from the Office for National Statistics indicate those under the age of 30 have been hardest hit by a fall in income during the COVID-19 outbreak.

==== 12 June ====
- Figures released by the Office for National Statistics show that the UK economy shrunk by 20.4% in April, the largest monthly contraction on record.
- Further ONS figures indicate deprived areas have been hit twice as hard by the COVID-19 epidemic when compared to more affluent areas. The impact has also been greater in urban areas compared to rural areas, with London experiencing the highest number of deaths per 100,000.
- The weekly ONS household survey finds that around 33,000 people in England had COVID-19 at any given time between 25 May and 7 June, and estimates the rate of new infections to be around 31,600 per week, down from 39,000 the previous week.

==== 13 June ====
- Parts of the Health Protection (COVID-19, Restrictions) (England) (Amendment No. 4) Regulations 2020 (SI 588) come into effect. In England and Northern Ireland, households with one adult may now become linked with one other household of any size, allowing them to be treated as one for the purpose of permitted gatherings. This also allows the members of one household to stay overnight at the home of the other. The government refers to this as a ”support bubble”. The rules on gatherings are also relaxed to allow medical appointments and births to be accompanied, and to permit some visits to people in hospital, hospices and care homes.
- The Welsh Guard performs a unique socially distanced military ceremony at Windsor Castle to mark the Queen's Official Birthday. The ceremony is held in place of the cancelled Trooping of the Colour, and sees the Queen's first public appearance since lockdown began.

==== 15 June ====
- The remainder of the Health Protection (COVID-19, Restrictions) (England) (Amendment No. 4) Regulations 2020 (SI 588) comes into effect, allowing the general re-opening of English retail shops and public-facing businesses apart from those that are on a list of specific exclusions such as restaurants, bars, pubs, nightclubs, most cinemas, theatres, museums, hairdressers, indoor sports and leisure facilities. Outdoor animal-related attractions such as farms, zoos and safari parks may open. Places of worship may again be used for private prayer (but not for communal worship). English libraries still have to remain closed.
- The Isle of Man lifts restrictions on social distancing except in health and care environments.
- Wearing a face covering becomes mandatory on public transport.

==== 16 June ====
- The low-dose steroid treatment dexamethasone, which has been part of clinical trials for existing drugs that could be used to treat patients with COVID-19, is heralded as a major breakthrough after it was found to cut the number of deaths. Experts estimate up to 5,000 lives may have been saved in the UK had the treatment been used from the outset. Prime Minister Boris Johnson describes the news as a genuine case to celebrate "a remarkable British scientific achievement". Dexamethasone will be made available through the NHS, which has a stockpile of 200,000 doses.
- Office for National Statistics figures suggest more than 600,000 people have lost their jobs between March and May because of the impact of the COVID-19 outbreak.
- A report published by National Foundation for Educational Research (NFER) suggests that 90% of teachers say their pupils are doing less work than would be the usual case for the time of year, while headteachers say a third of pupils are not engaging with the work set for them by their teachers.

==== 17 June ====
- Speaking to the Science and Technology Committee, Lord Bethell, the Minister for Innovation at the Department of Health and Social Care, says the contact tracing app is "not a priority" and may not be ready until the winter.
- Health Secretary Matt Hancock is pictured slapping a colleague on the back as they arrived at the House of Commons for Prime Minister's Questions, apparently forgetting social distancing measures.

==== 18 June ====
- The Bank of England announces plans to inject an extra £100bn into the UK economy to help fight downturn precipitated by the pandemic.
- The UK delays the launch of the contact tracing app, and changes its original format in favour of a model based on technology designed by Apple and Google. Compatibility issues were found between the app's and Apple's software, but unlike Apple's model the UK app is able to better measure distance, so the plan is to combine aspects of both into a single app. The Apple-Google model is also less centralised but more secure.
- The weekly ONS household survey estimates that around 33,000 people in England had COVID-19 at any given time between 31 May and 13 June, unchanged from the previous week. Antibodies were found in 5.4% of 1,757 people who gave blood samples since 26 April.
- Health Secretary Matt Hancock announces that pharmaceutical company AstraZeneca and Oxford University have reached a deal to begin the manufacture of a potential vaccine, even though it has yet to receive clinical approval. The plan is to stockpile the vaccine ready for its approval. Those over the age of 50 and with certain underlying health conditions will then be prioritised for the vaccine once launched.
- Office for National Statistics data for the two weeks up to 10 June indicates that of the 14,000 names passed to NHS Test and Trace for follow up, 10,200 had been contacted.

==== 19 June ====
UK's COVID-19 Alert Levels (introduced in May 2020)

- The UK's COVID-19 Alert Level is lowered from Level 4 (severe risk, high transmission) to Level 3 (substantial risk, general circulation), following the agreement of all four Chief Medical Officers. Health Secretary Matt Hancock describes the change as "a big moment for the country".
- Figures from the Treasury show that UK debt stands at £1.95trn, and is larger than the economy for the first time in 50 years following a record amount of borrowing in May. The amount borrowed in May was £55.2bn, nine times higher than borrowing for May 2019, and the highest monthly amount since records began.

==== 20 June ====
- Culture Secretary Oliver Dowden and Chancellor Rishi Sunak confirm that the review into the 2m social distancing rule in England will conclude within the coming days.
- Spain's foreign affairs minister Arancha González Laya announces that UK tourists will be able to visit Spain without the need for quarantine from the following day.
- Guernsey lifts the majority of its lockdown restrictions, meaning social distancing measures are no longer required and pubs, restaurants and other businesses can operate at normal capacity. But border controls remain in place.
- Northern Ireland records one death in the most recent 24 hour period, but no new cases of COVID-19 for the first time since March.

==== 21 June ====
- No new COVID-19 deaths are recorded for Scotland and Northern Ireland.

==== 22 June ====
- A new COVID-19 saliva test is trialled in the UK.
- The UK records its lowest number of new COVID-19 cases since the beginning of lockdown with 958 people having tested positive for the virus, the first time the figure has dropped below 1,000; the number of deaths recorded for the previous day stands at 15, the lowest figure since 15 March.
- The energy regulator Ofgem gives energy companies permission to follow up unpaid bills, but warns them not to be aggressive in their pursuit of unpaid debts.

==== 23 June ====
- Boris Johnson leads the UK government's final Downing Street daily briefing. From now on press briefings will be held whenever there is a significant announcement.
- Doctors have expressed concern that a significant number of COVID-19 patients may be left with the permanent lung condition pulmonary fibrosis as a result of the virus, and will need to be monitored for signs of the condition.

==== 24 June ====
- Scientists at Imperial College London begin human trials of a COVID-19 vaccine after tests on animals indicate an effective immune response; 300 volunteers will take part in the programme.
- The British Medical Journal publishes an open letter from health leaders in which they call on the government to launch an urgent review to determine whether the UK is prepared for what they describe as the "real risk" of a second wave of COVID-19.
- The UK government publishes new advice for businesses on how to safely reopen their premises on 4 July.

==== 25 June ====
- In a letter to the British Medical Journal, a group of senior health academics expresses their concern that COVID-19 antibody tests for NHS and care staff are being rolled out without "adequate assessment" and will place the health service under unnecessary strain.
- As the UK experiences a short heatwave, Bournemouth, Christchurch and Poole Council declares a major incident after as many as half a million people travel to the Dorset coast. Professor Chris Whitty, the UK's chief medical officer, warns people to respect social distancing guidelines while enjoying the weather or the number of COVID-19 cases "will rise again".
- The weekly ONS household survey for 8–21 June estimates that new infections were occurring at a rate of 22,000 per week, and notes that the decline seen between mid-May and early June has "levelled off".
- The UK government announces plans to relax rules for England and Wales allowing pubs and restaurants to utilise outdoor spaces such as terraces, pavements and car parks, while outdoor markets and fetes will no longer need planning permission.

==== 26 June ====
- Prime Minister Boris Johnson warns that the UK could be set back if people continue to ignore social distancing rules as those who visited the south coast the previous day have done.
- Professor Neil Ferguson, a former government scientific adviser, says he does not believe a second national lockdown would be necessary, but instead would expect to see "targeted" measures to deal with outbreaks.
- Research published by the University of Oxford's Centre for Evidence-Based Medicine shows that the proportion of COVID hospital patients dying each day in England has fallen from 6% to 1% between April and June. In terms of numbers, 15,468 people were in hospital in England of which 899 died (6%) on 8 April, compared to 2,698 hospital patients on 21 June, 30 of which died (1%).
- Intu Properties, owner of many of the UK's largest shopping centres, goes into administration because of the financial impact of the COVID-19 outbreak.
- The UK government confirms that people returning from certain countries will not be required to quarantine for 14 days when returning to the UK from 6 July. A traffic lights system will be established allocating colours depending on a country's risk level, with a list of countries to be confirmed at a later date.

==== 27 June ====
- Travel companies report that holiday bookings have "exploded" since the UK government announced plans to ease quarantine restrictions on travel abroad. But Scotland says it is yet to decide on the matter. Although the UK government has authority over border control, the Scottish government must be consulted on quarantine in Scotland because health matters in Scotland are devolved to the Scottish government.
- The Red Arrows perform a fly-past over Scarborough for Armed Forces Day; a celebration in the town for the occasion was cancelled because of the COVID-19 outbreak.

==== 28 June ====
- Home Secretary Priti Patel confirms a Sunday Times report that the government is considering imposing a local lockdown on Leicester, which has seen a spike in COVID-19 cases. Of the 2,494 cases reported in the city, 658 of them (around 25%) occurred in the two weeks preceding 16 June.

==== 29 June ====
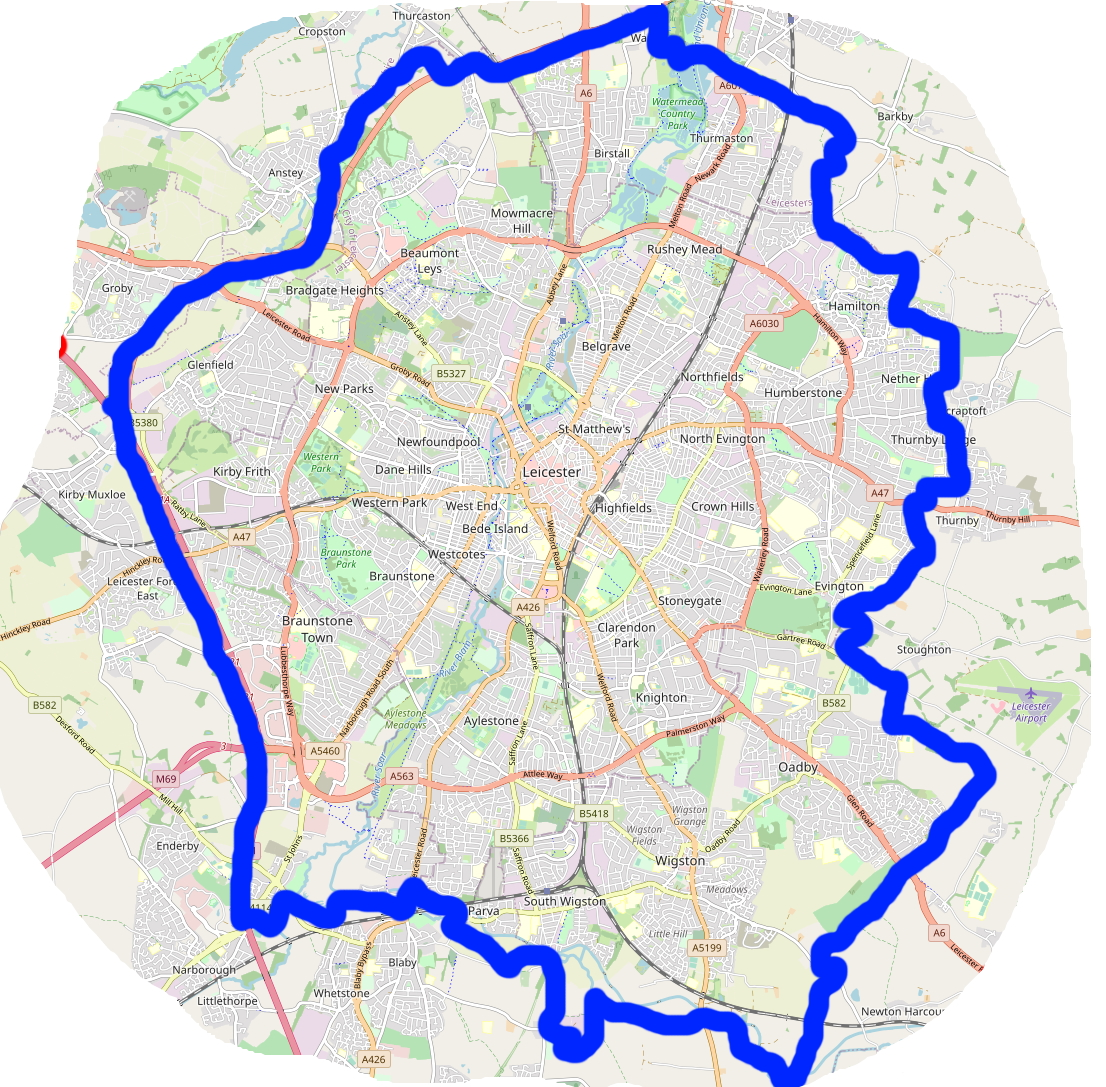
Leicester and the extent of UK's first local-lockdown

- Following a spike in COVID-19 cases in Leicester, Health Secretary Matt Hancock announces the reintroduction of stricter lockdown measures for the city, including the closure of non-essential retailers from the following day, and the closure of schools from 2 July. People in Leicester are advised to stay at home as much as possible, while it is recommended that all but essential travel to, from and within the city should be avoided. Of the 2,987 positive cases in Leicester since the pandemic began, 866 (29%) were reported in the two weeks preceding 23 June, while Hancock says Leicester accounted for "10% of all positive cases in the country over the past week". Sir Peter Soulsby, the Mayor of Leicester has criticises a lack of communication between the UK government and Leicester City Council which he describes as "intensely frustrating".
- The UK government announces that mandatory MOT tests will be reintroduced from 1 August.
- Analysis produced by the BBC indicated that the UK has been the worst hit of the G7 countries in terms of COVID-19, while England is the worst hit nation of Europe, just ahead of Spain.
- The Greek Government extends its ban on flights from the UK until 15 July.
- The England and Wales Cricket Board confirms that the 2020 domestic first-class cricket season will begin on 1 August.

==== 30 June ====
- As Leicester begins at least two weeks of re-tightened lockdown restrictions, a list of other areas where COVID-19 cases are rising is published, though the increases are much smaller than Leicester.
- Prime Minister Boris Johnson sets out a £5bn post-COVID-19 recovery plan for the UK that will see home building and improvements to infrastructure, describing it as a "new deal".
- Figures from the Office for National Statistics have indicated the number of deaths in the week up to 19 June fell below the five year average for the first time since March.
- Rented e-scooters are to be permitted on UK roads from 4 July in a bid to ease pressure on public transport.
- EasyJet begins the consultation process for plans to close three of its UK bases.

== See also ==
- Timeline of the COVID-19 pandemic in the United Kingdom (July–December 2020)
- Timeline of the COVID-19 pandemic in the United Kingdom (January–June 2021)
- Timeline of the COVID-19 pandemic in the United Kingdom (July–December 2021)
- Timeline of the COVID-19 pandemic in the United Kingdom (January–June 2022)
- Timeline of the COVID-19 pandemic in the United Kingdom (July–December 2022)
- Timeline of the COVID-19 pandemic in the United Kingdom (2023)
- Timeline of the COVID-19 pandemic in the United Kingdom (2024)
- Timeline of the COVID-19 pandemic in England (2020)
- Timeline of the COVID-19 pandemic in Scotland (2020)
- Timeline of the COVID-19 pandemic in Wales (2020)
- Timeline of the COVID-19 pandemic in Northern Ireland (2020)
- History of the COVID-19 pandemic in the United Kingdom
