= Care Provider Alliance =

Group of social care providers in England

The Care Provider Alliance (CPA) is an informal alliance of the ten main national associations which represent independent and voluntary adult social care providers in England.

It reaches over 95% of all care and support provider organisations, in a sector with 1.6 million employees, helping and supporting adults with physical, sensory or learning disabilities, people with mental ill-health, and older people to live good quality, independent lives.

The role of CPA chair rotates annually across each of the ten associations. Prof Vic Rayner, CEO of the National Care Form is the current chair of the alliance.

The members are:

- Associated Retirement Community Operators (ARCO)
- Association for Real Change(ARC)
- Association of Mental Health Providers
- Care Association Alliance (CAA)
- Care England
- Home Care Association
- National Care Association (NCA)
- National Care Forum (NCF)
- Shared Lives Plus
- Voluntary Organisations Disability Group

The CPA acts as a collective voice, and as a pressure group and lobbyist for the sector. It has been very involved with initiatives developed under the Better Care Fund and has produced various resources for its members.

In 2015 it formed an alliance with the Association of Directors of Adult Social Services, the Care and Support Alliance, and the NHS Confederation all of whose members are affected by the pressures on social care. At that time, the alliance was attempting to influence the result of the 2015 Comprehensive Spending Review. It warned that the sector was facing “a deepening crisis” and the campaign attracted support from some local authorities.

Throughout the COVID19 pandemic in 2020, the CPA played an integral part in highlighting the major challenges facing the sector, writing to the then Prime Minister Boris Johnson on 27 March warning: “Margins are very tight and the sector is working at full capacity, while also experiencing increasing levels of staff sickness.

It also joined other organisations raising concerns bout decisions on advanced care plans and DNAR forms, stating “must continue to be made on an individual basis according to need.”

At the same time, it was disseminating information to care providers, to ensure care staff and people who used care services were applied to EU Settlement Scheme (EUSS). This would ensure they are able to continue to live, work and access funding and services in the UK after 30 June 2021.

In November 2022, the CPA published a report The State of the Social Care and Support Provision in England, highlighting the key issues currently afflicting the social care sector.

More recently, the CPA is driving an urgent call to address the devastating impact on care and support of the rises in employee National Insurance and other announcements made in the 2024 Autumn budget; its survey of more than 1,180 care and support providers in England found 22% of those asked said they were planning to close their businesses entirely and 57% will hand back existing contracts to local authorities or the NHS as a result of the rising costs.

Almost three-quarters (73%) said they will have to refuse new care packages from local authorities or the NHS, and 64% said they will have to make staff redundant.
