= Association of Directors of Adult Social Services =

The Association of Directors of Adult Social Services (ADASS) is a charity representing directors of adult social services in England, and is a leading body on social care issues.

The association aims to further the interests of people in need of social care by promoting high standards of social care services and influencing the development of social care legislation and policy.

Membership is drawn from serving directors of adult social care employed by the 152 local authorities in England with social care responsibilities. Former directors are associate members, and deputy and assistant directors are also involved in the work of the association.

The association acts as a lobbying voice for social care, pressing, for example, for adequate funding, and defending the performance of social care departments. It has also worked alongside other organisations such as the Care and Support Alliance, the Care Provider Alliance and the NHS Confederation whose members are affected by the pressures on social care.

ADASS issues guidance to local authorities on professional standards and the law, for example in respect of Deprivation of Liberty Safeguards, subsequent to the decision in the case in Cheshire West.

It reports that 400,000 fewer people received social care services in England in 2014-5 than in 2009-10, despite an increasingly elderly population. The proportion provided directly by local councils is also falling.

Sarah McClinton, president of the Association, said at the annual National Children and Adult Services Conference in Manchester in November 2022 that a “staggering” number of people were not getting the care and support they needed as requests for help outstrip local councils’ ability to provide it.
