= Thank You NHS =

2020–2021 British social phenomenon

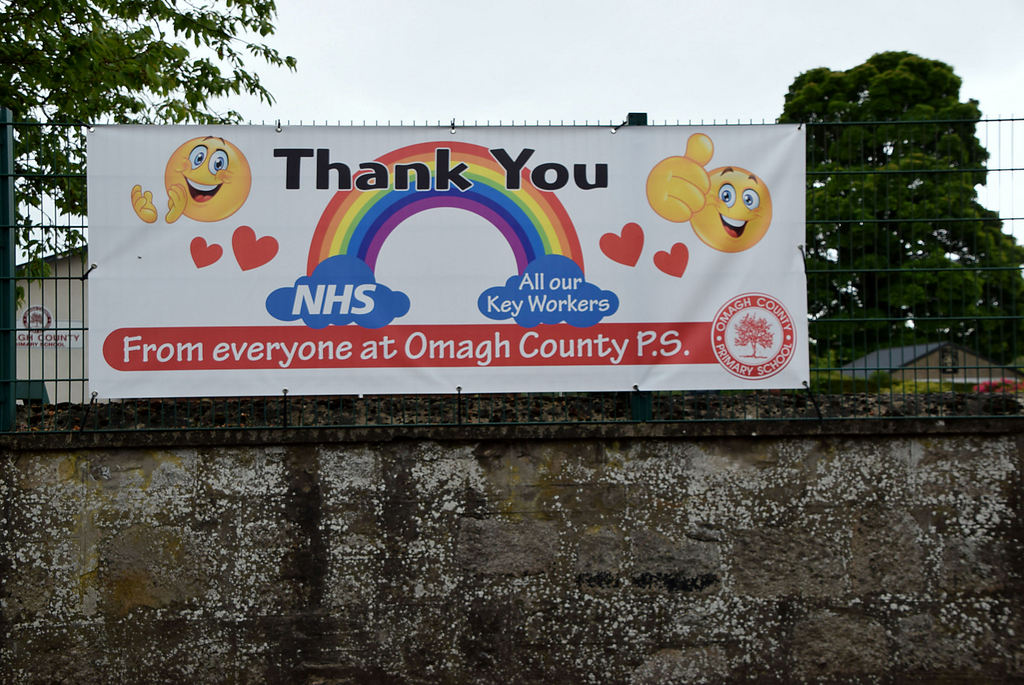
"Thank You NHS" sign outside a primary school in Omagh, Northern Ireland

"Thank You NHS" was a social phenomenon in the United Kingdom during 2020 and 2021, for part of the COVID-19 pandemic, whereby people and organisations posted messages of support for members of the National Health Service and other key workers, to acknowledge their heavy workload as well as their risk of infection.

Large numbers of private individuals placed home-made signs in their windows and outside their homes to thank the NHS workers. The handmade posters frequently featured drawings of rainbows.

The campaign was supported by the Conservative Party-controlled British government, which displayed children's "Thank You NHS" signs in the windows of 10 Downing Street. Organizations also supporting the campaign included the British Labour Party and Hull City Council. Other sponsors included sports teams such as Hibernian F.C. and the Premier League.

Some media outlets released poster artwork for people to print and display.

== Gallery ==
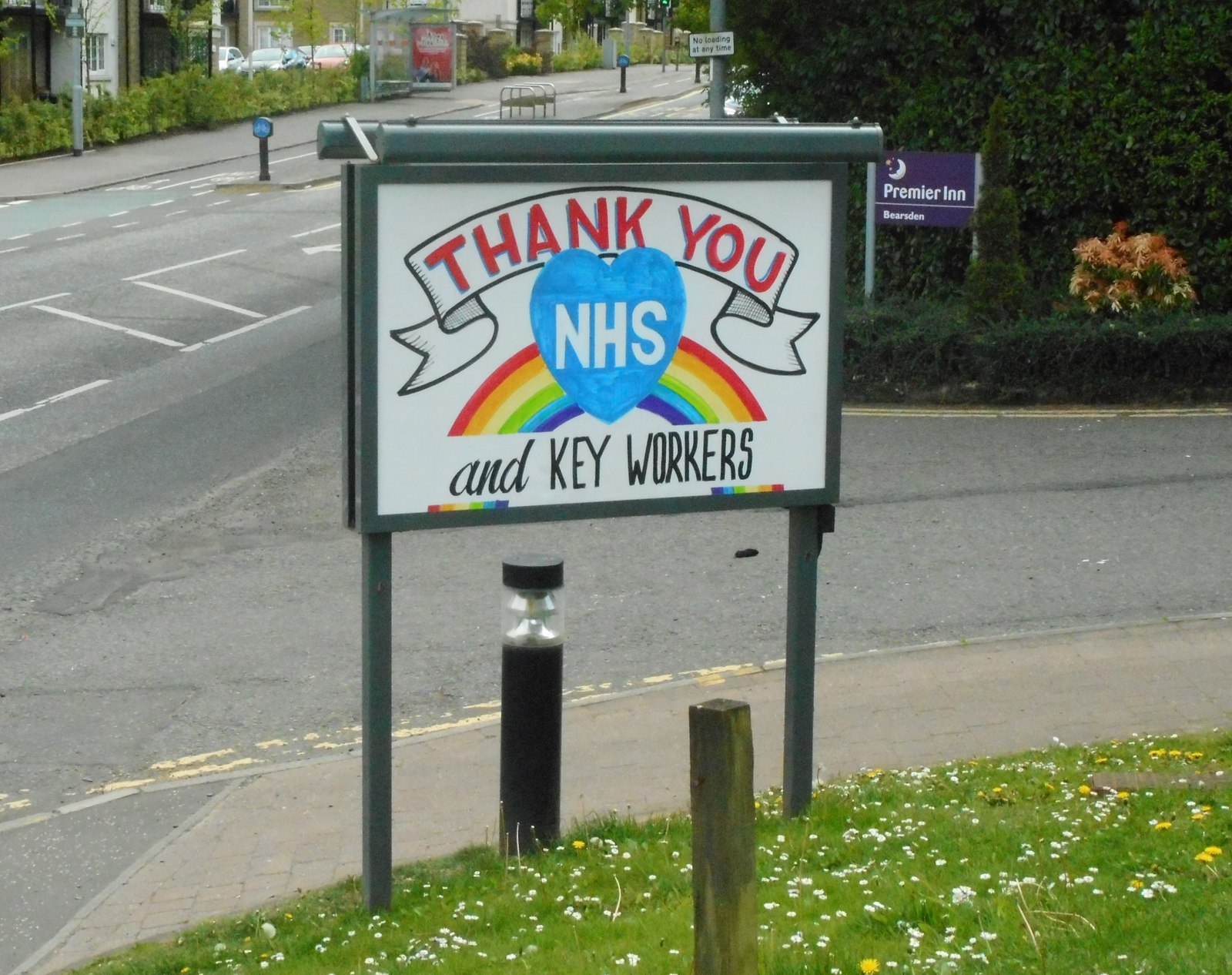
"Thank You NHS" sign outside a restaurant in East Dunbartonshire

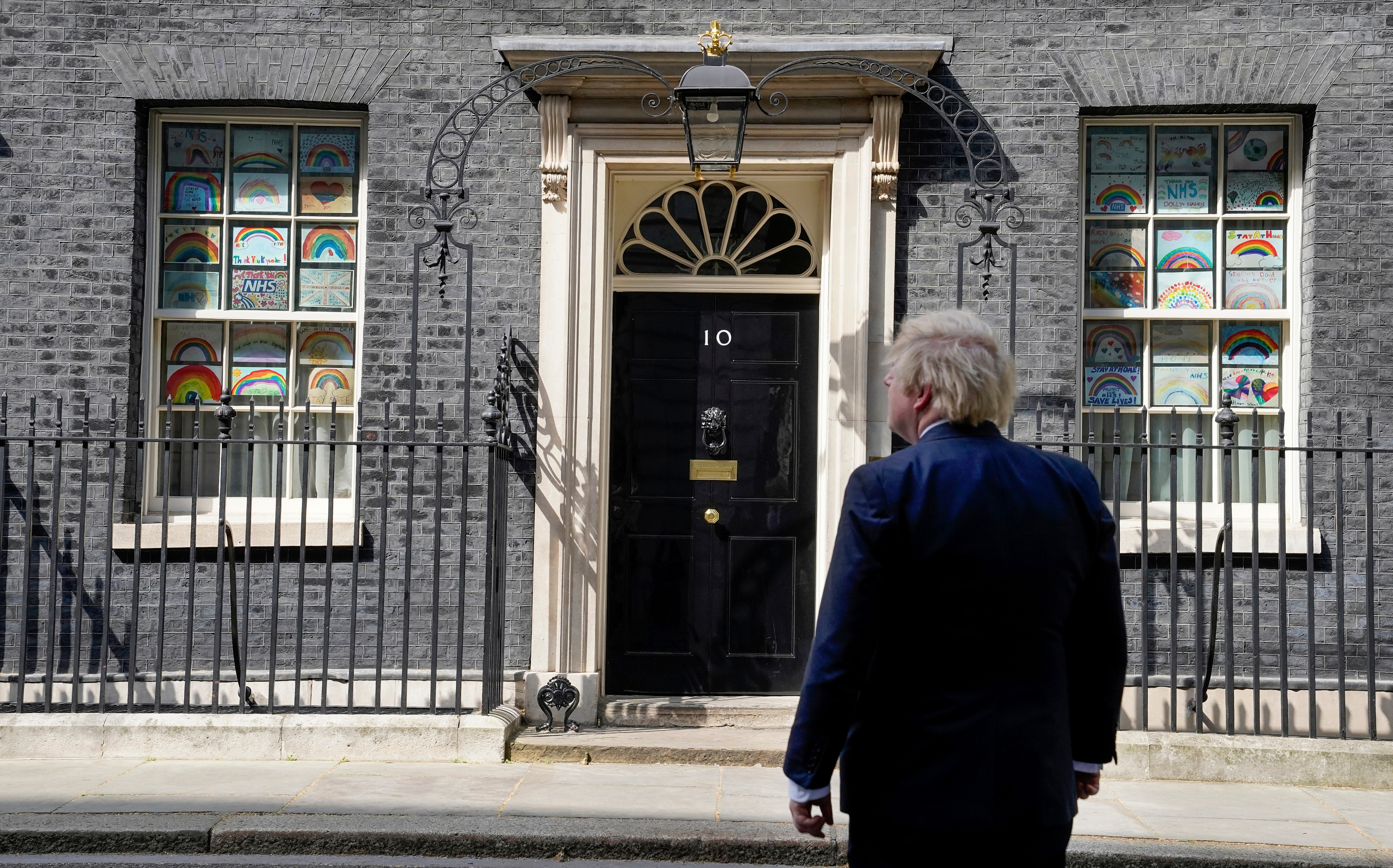
Children's "Thank You NHS" signs displayed in the windows of 10 Downing Street

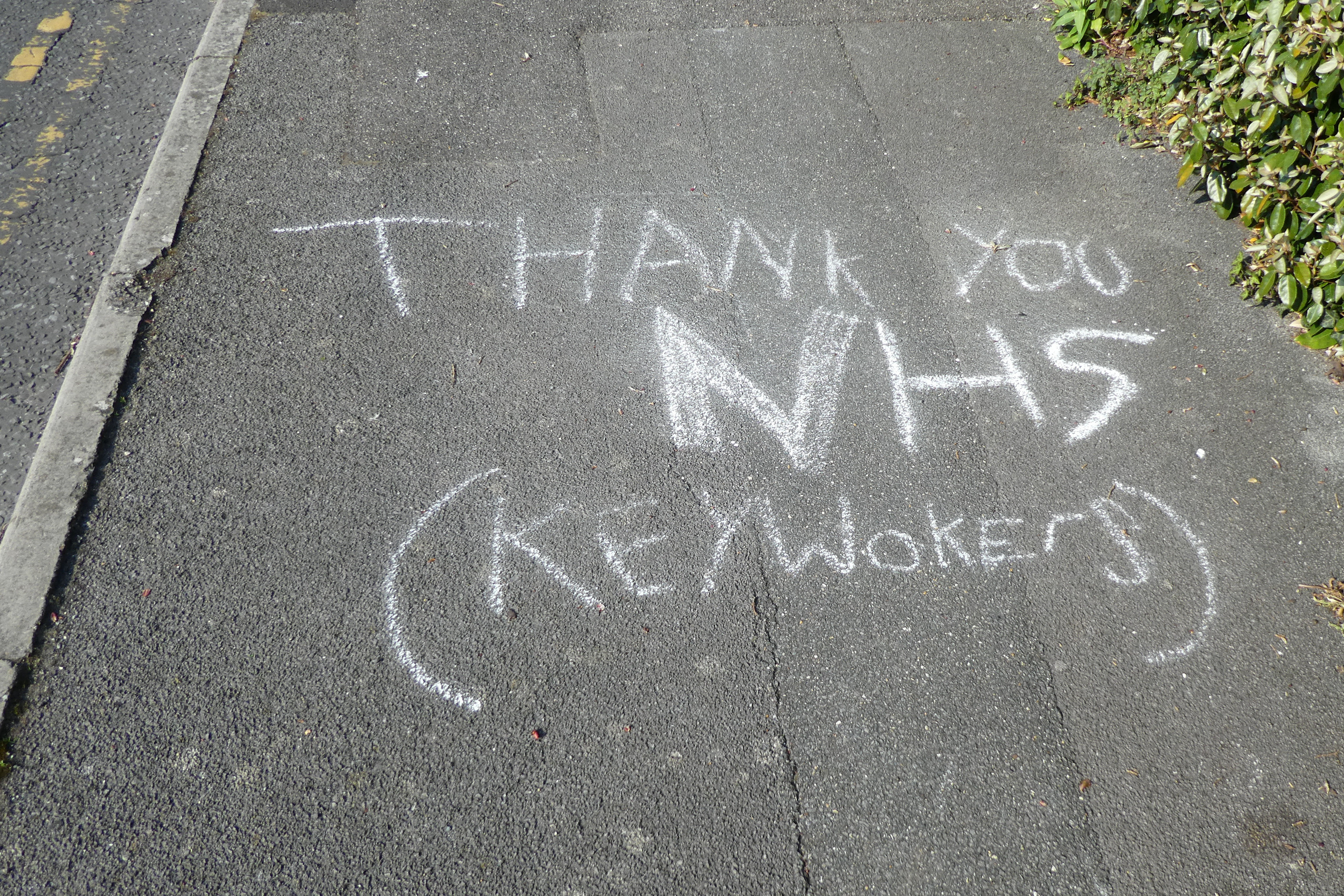
"Thank you NHS (Keyworkers)" chalked on a pavement in Weymouth

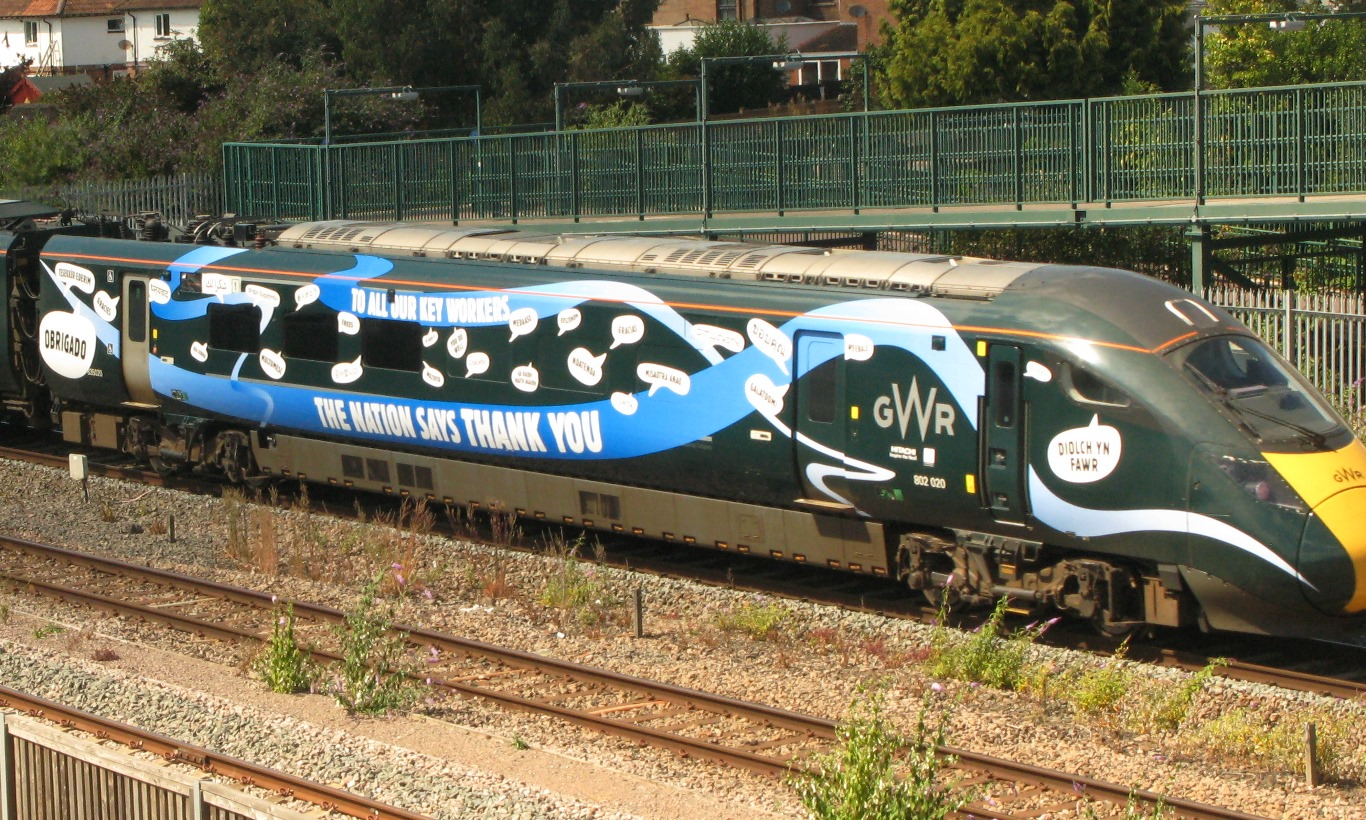
Great Western Railway 802 020: the special livery says "to all our key workers ... the nation says thank you"

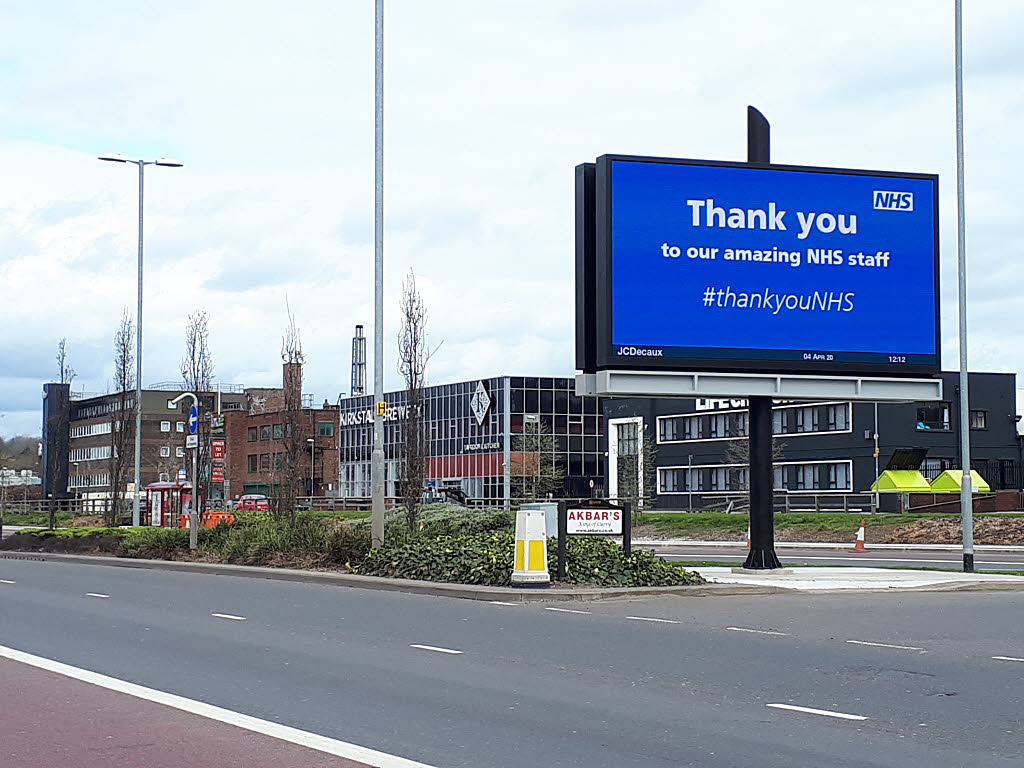
"Thank you to our amazing NHS staff ... #ThankYouNHS" sign on an electronic billboard in Leeds

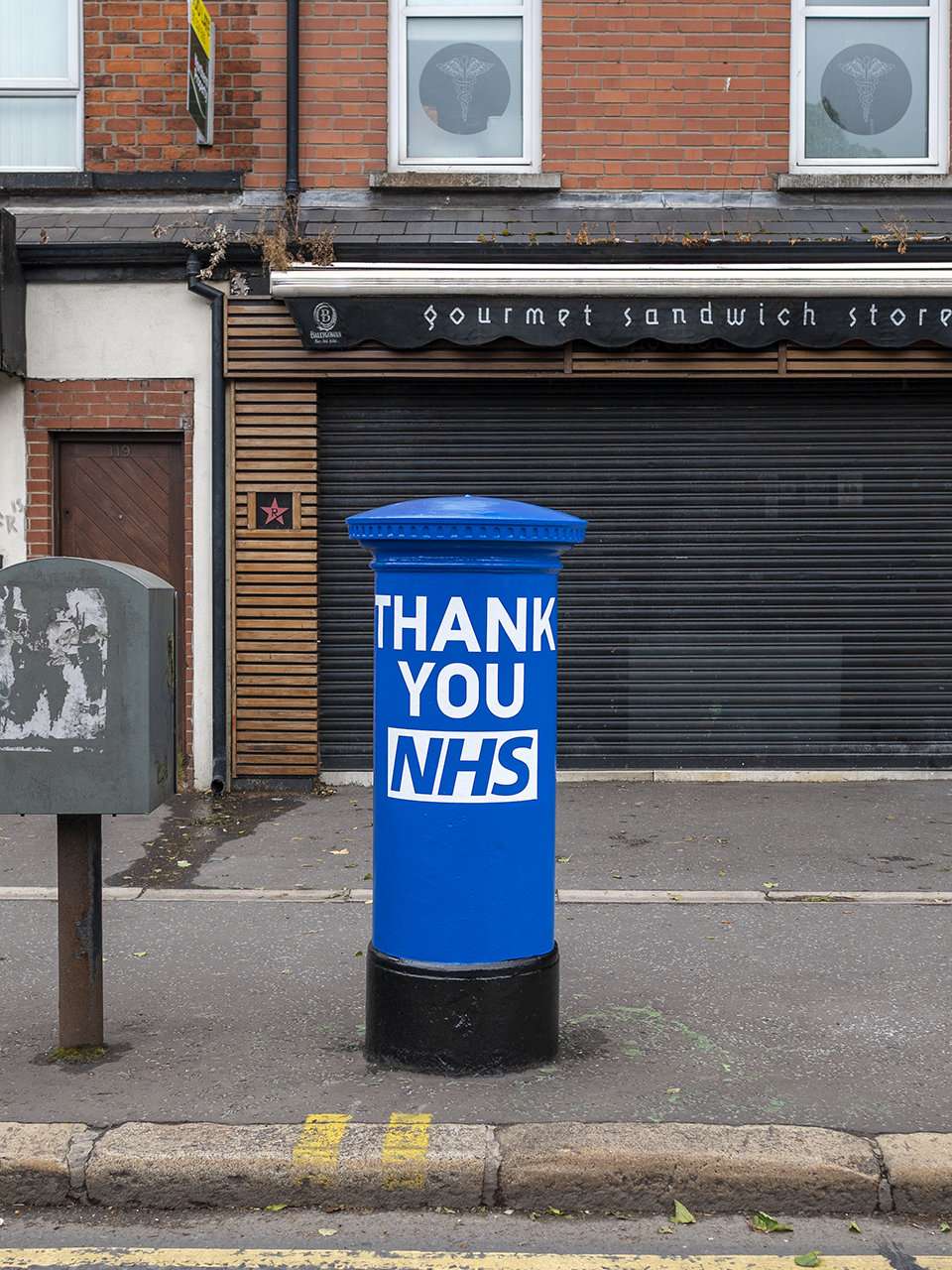
A "thank you NHS" post box in Belfast

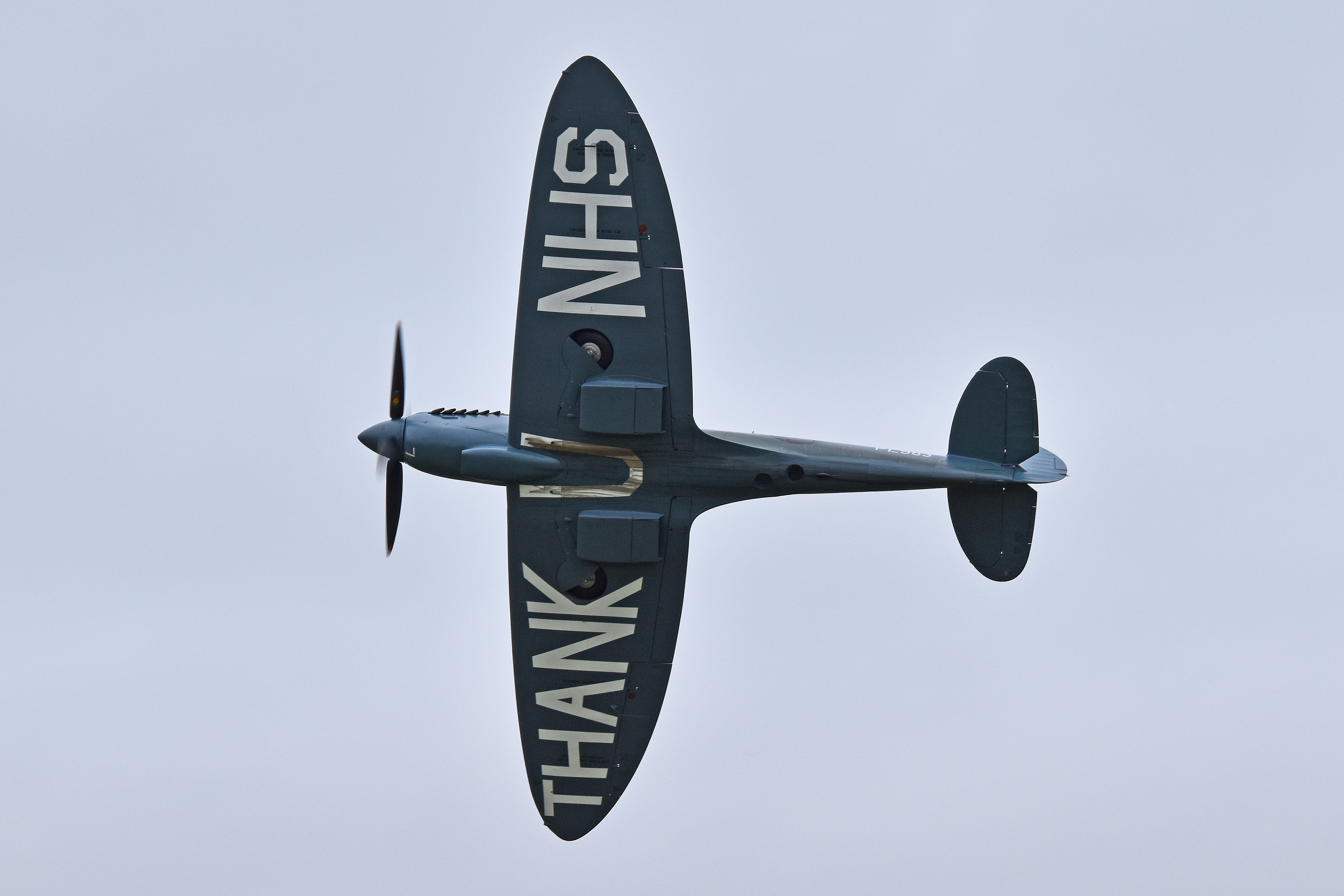
Supermarine Spitfire PR Mk.XI PL983 wearing 'THANK U NHS' on the underside of its wings

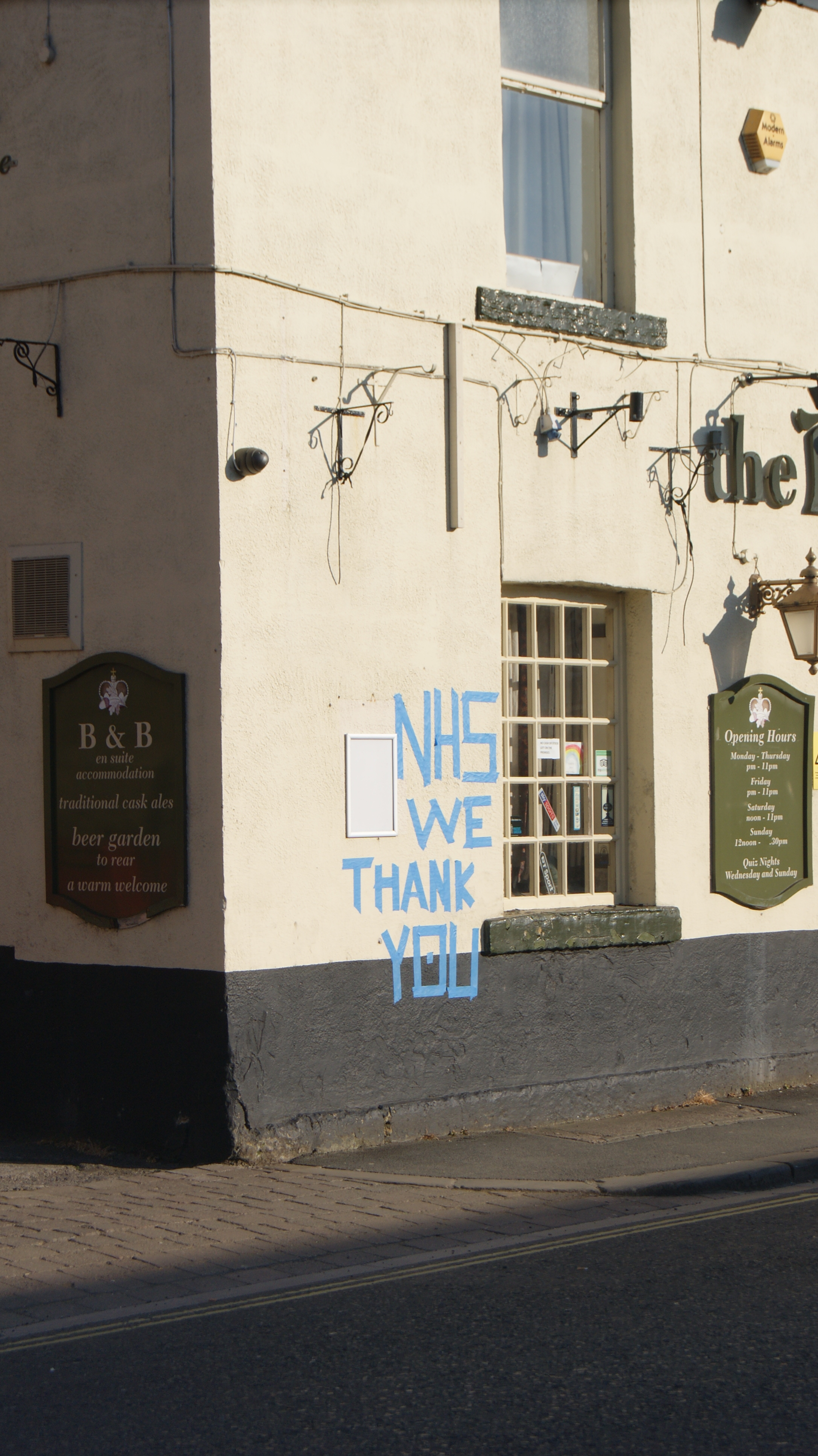
'NHS we thank you' graffiti on a pub in Wetherby, West Yorkshire, made using gaffer tape

== See also ==
- Clap for Our Carers
