= Coronavirus Job Retention Scheme =

Furlough scheme in the United Kingdom

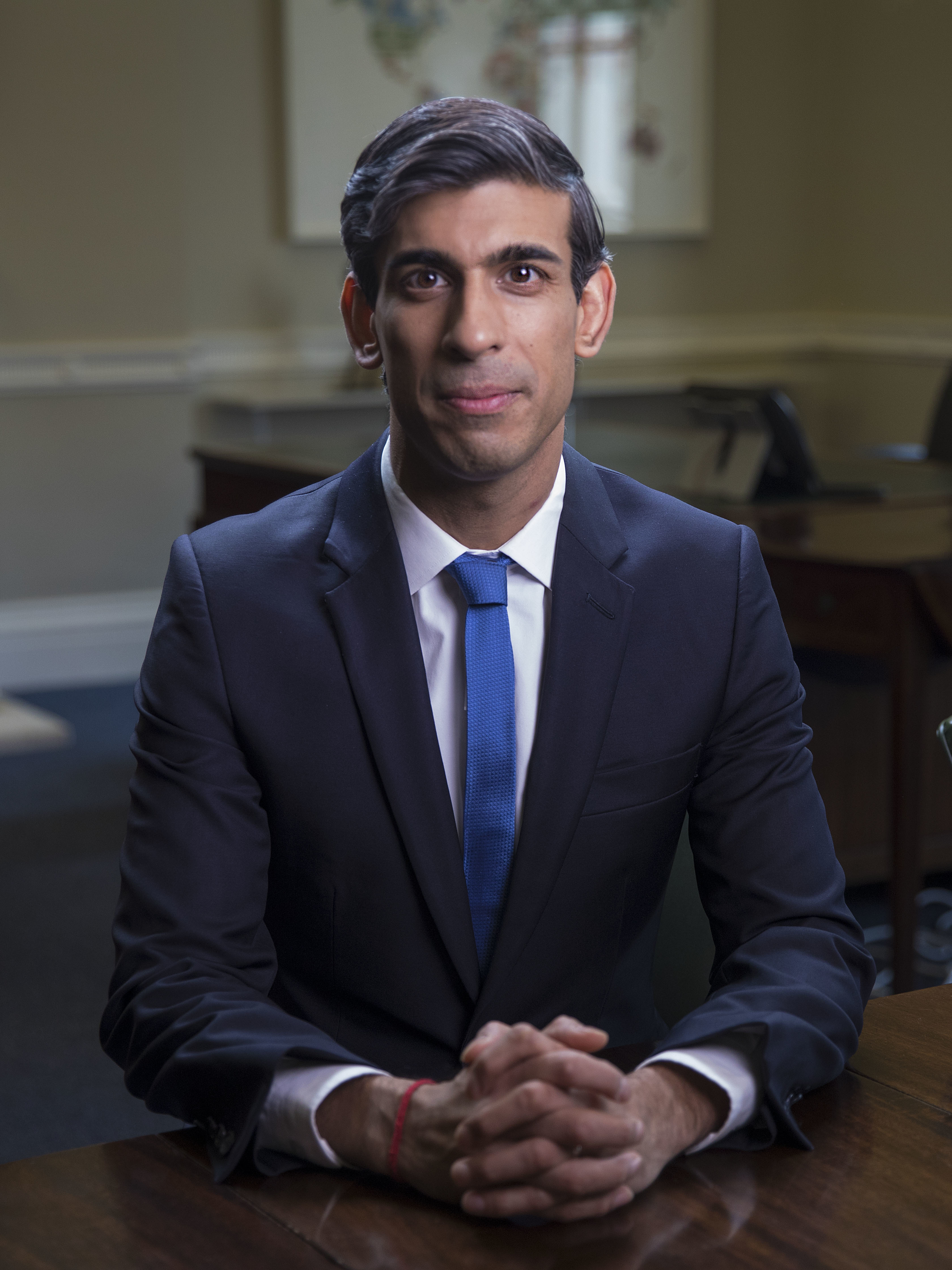
The Coronavirus Job Retention Scheme was announced by Rishi Sunak (pictured)

The Coronavirus Job Retention Scheme (CJRS) was a furlough scheme announced by Rishi Sunak, the Chancellor of the Exchequer, on 20 March 2020, during the COVID-19 pandemic in the United Kingdom. The scheme was announced as providing grants to employers to pay 80% of a staff wage and employment costs each month, up to a total of £2,500 per person per month. The scheme initially ran for three months and was backdated to 1 March. The scheme ultimately covered the period 1 March 2020 until 30 September 2021, and had a total cost of £70 billion.

== The scheme ==
Initially the scheme was only for those workers who were on their company's payroll on or before 28 February 2020; this was later changed to 19 March 2020 (i.e. the day before the scheme was announced), making 200,000 additional workers eligible. The Institute for Employment Studies estimated that 100,000 people could not be eligible for any type of government help as they started a new job too late to be included on the job retention scheme. Trade body UKHospitality informed the Treasury Select Committee that between 350,000 and 500,000 workers in its sector were not eligible. On the first day of operation 140,000 companies applied to use the scheme.

Following a three-week extension of the countrywide lockdown in April 2020, the scheme was extended until the end of June 2020. At the end of May, the scheme was extended again, this time until the end of October 2020. After a second lockdown in England was announced on 31 October 2020, a further extension was announced until 2 December 2020, this was followed on 5 November 2020 by a lengthy extension until 31 March 2021. A further extension until 30 April 2021 was announced on 17 December 2020. A day ahead of the 2021 United Kingdom budget held on 3 March 2021, it was confirmed that the scheme had been extended once more until 30 September 2021.

The cost of the scheme had been estimated at £14 billion a month. The decision to extend the job retention scheme was made to avoid or defer mass redundancies, company bankruptcies and potential unemployment levels not seen since the 1930s. The original scheme closed to new entrants from 30 June 2020, and as claims were made for staff at the end of a three-week period, the last date an employee could be furloughed for the first time was 10 June 2020. As of 27 May 2020, 8.4 million employees had been furloughed under the scheme. In an extension announced on 31 October, the scheme reopened to new entrants and the claim period was reduced to seven days. By 18 October 2020 the scheme had cost £41.4 billion.

From July 2020 the scheme provided more flexibility, with employees able to return to part-time work without affecting eligibility, although employers now covered all wages and employment costs for the hours worked. In addition, from August 2020, National Insurance and pension contributions were to be paid by employers. Employer contributions rose to 10% of wages throughout September 2020 and 20% throughout October, before returning to the August arrangement from November 2020. Employer contributions returned to 10% in July 2021, then 20% in August and September 2021.

Following changes to the scheme announced at the end of May 2020, the director of the Northern Ireland Retail Consortium said that being asked to pay wages when businesses had not been trading was an added pressure. The Federation of Small Businesses were surprised that the Chancellor had announced a tapering of the scheme when ending it. Northern Ireland's economy minister Diane Dodds said that changes to the scheme could be very difficult for some sectors uncertain about when they could reopen, particularly in the hospitality and retail sector, whilst finance minister Conor Murphy said that it was too early in the economic recovery.

== Repayments ==
By 15 August 2020, 80,433 firms had returned £216 million claimed under the scheme, while other companies had claimed smaller amounts of grant cash on the next instalment to compensate for overpayment. HMRC officials believed that £3.5 billion may have been paid out in error or to fraudsters. Games Workshop, Bunzl, The Spectator magazine, Redrow, Barratt Developments and Taylor Wimpey were among the companies who returned all the furlough money they had claimed.

== Fraud against the schemes ==
In June 2020, David Clarke, chair of the Fraud Advisory Panel charity and a group of white-collar crime experts alerted Sunak, the National Audit Office, and others, to the risk of fraud against the schemes. They called for publication of the names of companies receiving Bounce Back Loans to enable data matching to prevent, deter and detect fraud. In September 2020, it emerged that Government Ministers were warned about the risk of fraud against the financial support schemes by Keith Morgan, CEO of the state-owned British Business Bank who had concerns about the Bounce Back Loan Scheme and Future Fund. In December 2020, it was reported that banks and the National Crime Agency also had concerns about fraudulent abuse of the Bounce Back Loan Scheme.

In January 2021, the NCA reported that three city workers who worked for the same London financial institution had been arrested as part of an investigation into fraudulent Bounce Back Loans totalling £6 million. The NCA said the men were suspected of using their "specialist knowledge" to carry out the fraud. This form of insider fraud was a risk highlighted in the letter sent to Sunak in June 2020. A 2022 Freedom of Information request to the British Business Bank, the state-run body administering the bounce back loan scheme, found that almost one fifth, or 193,000 businesses had failed to meet their repayment terms as at 27 June 2022. The UK government estimated that £4.9 billion of bounce back loans may have been lost to fraud.
