= Clap for Our Carers =

2020 British social movement

- Clap for Our Carers logo

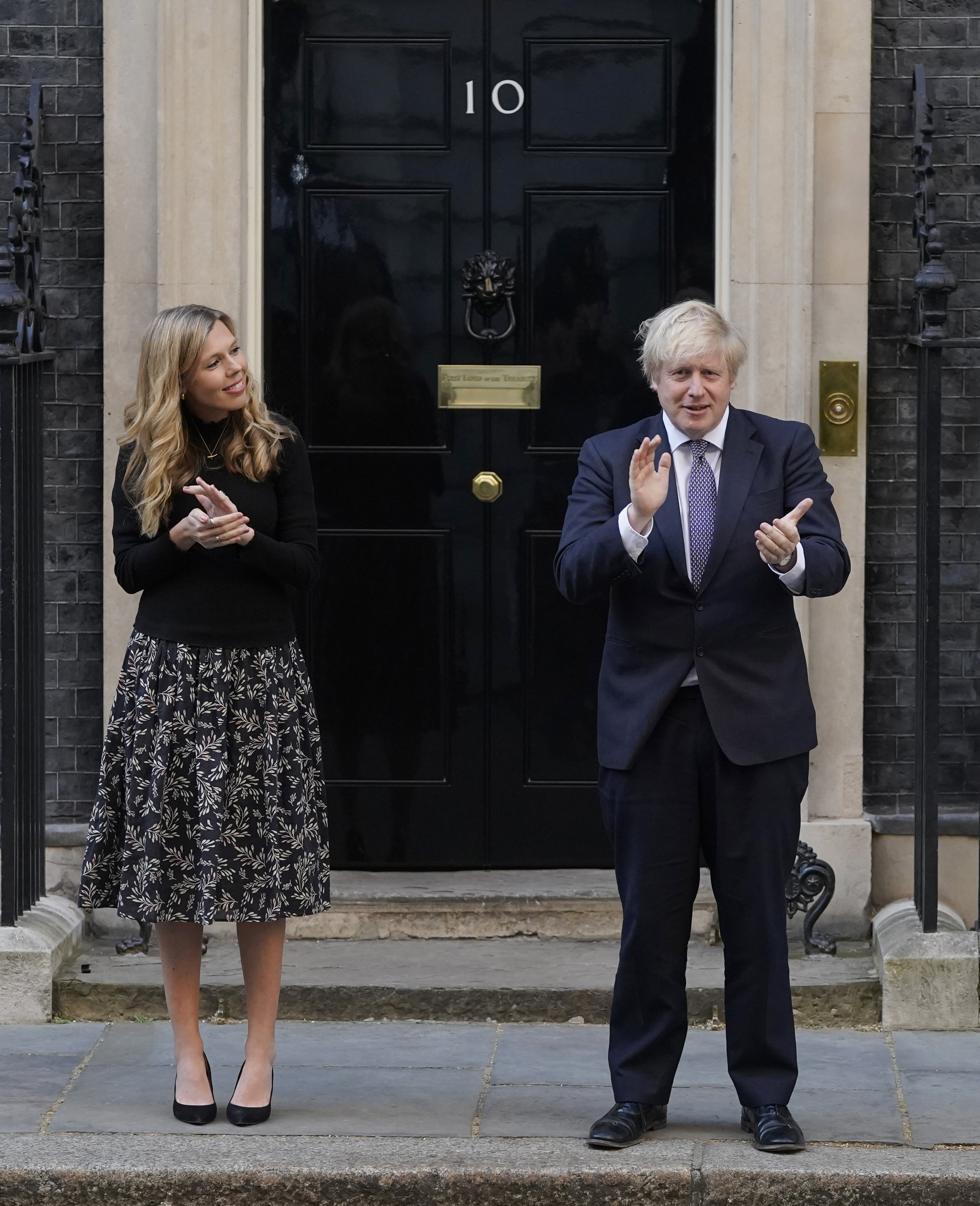
- Prime Minister Boris Johnson with his partner Carrie Symonds taking part in 'Clap for our Carers' on the steps of 10 Downing Street
- Genre: Social movement
- Frequency: 2020: Weekly (20:00 Thursdays)
- Country: United Kingdom
- Inaugurated: 26 March 2020
- Founder: Annemarie Plas
- Most recent: 28 May 2020
- Major events: Clapping.; Clapping for the NHS in Oxford
- Website: clapforourcarers.co.uk

Clap for Our Carers, also known as Clap for Carers, Clap for the NHS, Clap for Key Workers or Clap for Heroes, was a social movement created as a gesture of appreciation for the workers of the United Kingdom's National Health Service (NHS) and other key workers during the COVID-19 pandemic, which spread to the United Kingdom in January 2020.

The idea originated in Europe and was adopted in the UK by Annemarie Plas, a Dutch woman living in London, who promoted a campaign which took place every Thursday at 20:00 between 26 March and 28 May 2020. Many celebrities, influencers, politicians, and public figures supported the campaign.

== Background and origins ==
In December 2019, health authorities in Wuhan, China, identified an unusual cluster of pneumonia cases. Subsequent investigations revealed this illness was caused by a new coronavirus, SARS-CoV-2. On 11 March 2020, the outbreak was declared a global pandemic by the World Health Organization (WHO) with 118,000 confirmed cases of COVID-19 in 114 countries. The virus was confirmed to have spread to the United Kingdom on 31 January 2020 and by 20 March, the number of cases there had surpassed 3,200. As the number of cases grew, the public health response to the virus has also evolved. From 20 March, most schools, colleges and nurseries were closed. On 23 March, stricter social distancing measures were implemented to curb the spread of the virus.

During the peak phase of the pandemic, around March to May/June 2020, the UK government's message was that the entire population, with few exceptions, should stay at home to protect themselves and others from infection, and "protect the NHS" (National Health Service), which was at risk of being overwhelmed by COVID-19 cases. UK media widely reported on the extreme difficulties and risks to their own lives, faced by NHS staff in particular, who initially lacked the necessary large scale supplies of personal protective equipment and life support equipment needed.

As a result, a sense of widespread appreciation developed towards NHS workers, and also towards other key workers, who supported the population during this time. A weekly show of appreciation developed during which large parts of the UK population showed their appreciation, from the safety of their homes.

Although similar activities had already been happening in India, Italy, France, Spain and The Netherlands in the weeks prior the idea for Clap for Our Carers is credited to Annemarie Plas, a Dutch immigrant living in London who had appropriated a similar event that she had seen from the Netherlands.

== Description ==
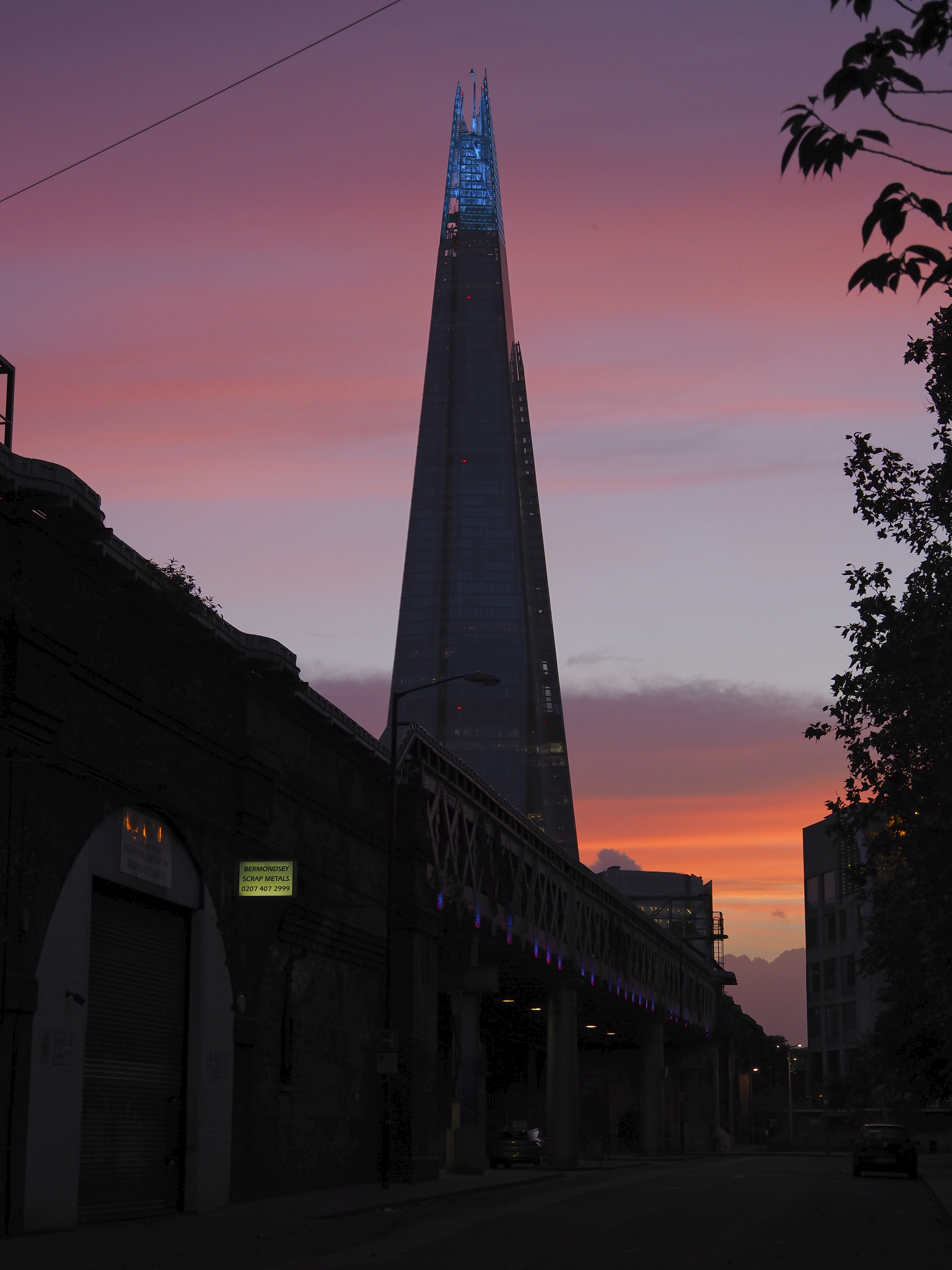
The Shard illuminated in blue to appreciate the healthcare workers

The event is typically a round of applause outside a participating person's home or from one of their windows; however, people have also taken part by banging pots and pans, playing music and setting off fireworks. Millions are reported to have taken part. In the first campaign, at 20:00 on 26 March 2020, people across the UK clapped, cheered, and rang bells to thank NHS workers for their role during the pandemic. Princes George and Louis, and Princess Charlotte also supported the event from their residence at Anmer Hall.

On 2 April, appreciation extended to all key workers, including healthcare workers, emergency services, armed services, delivery drivers, people who work in shops, teachers, waste collectors, manufacturers, postal workers, cleaners, vets and engineers. That day, event founder Annemarie Plas wrote in an Instagram post, "tonight we will show our appreciation again! For ALL that go out to work so that we can stay in!".

The campaign was subsequently repeated at 20:00 every Thursday until 28 May, as lockdown restrictions began to be eased throughout the UK. The campaign received coverage from media such as Sky, ITV, Channel 4 and the BBC. Notable people who participated in the event include Prime Minister Boris Johnson, Chancellor of the Exchequer Rishi Sunak, Jeremy Corbyn, Sir Paul McCartney, Kylie Minogue, David Beckham, Daniel Craig, Phoebe Waller-Bridge, Naomie Harris and Sir Elton John. The Queen referred to the Clap for Our Carers campaign as an “expression of our national spirit”. Landmarks such as The Shard, Tower Bridge, the London Eye, Blackpool Tower, the Tyne Bridge, the Radio City Tower, The Kelpies, MediaCityUK, and Windsor Castle were illuminated in blue during the event.

A Clap for the NHS was organised for the afternoon of 5 July 2020, the 72nd anniversary of its establishment. An annual Clap for Our Carers Day was initially planned for the last Thursday of March each year.

== Response ==
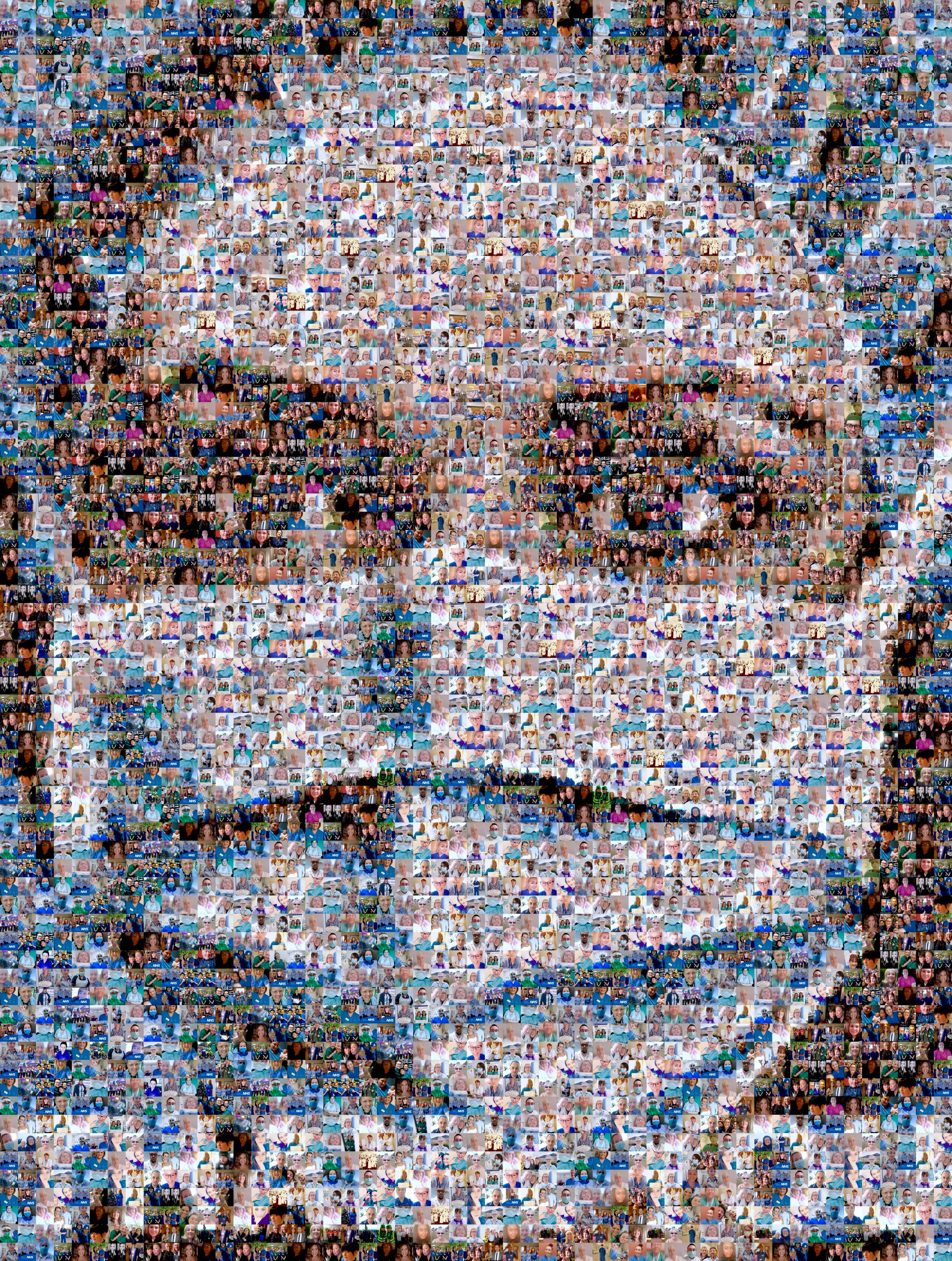
Thank You collage by Nathan Wyburn, 2020 (click to show individual faces)

Clap for Our Carers inspired Nathan Wyburn to produce a digital collage made up of more than 200 images of NHS workers, to pay tribute to their work.

The practice of applauding has been criticised by some political commentators and medical workers as an empty gesture amid budget cuts and equipment shortages for the NHS.

In January 2021, Annemarie Plas and her family received online abuse for bringing back the movement under the name "Clap for Our Heroes". Plas later released a statement announcing she was distancing herself from the event, while stating that she had no intentions of politicising it. The comeback attempt was not well received by the public and very little turned out, thus causing its permanent ceasing.

== See also ==
- Thank You NHS
