= National Care Association =

English trade association

- Formation: 1981; 45 years ago
- Merger of: Registered Nursing Home Association (RNHA)
- Type: Trade association
- Purpose: Advocate for the social care provider industry
- Location: Rochester, Kent, United Kingdom
- Region served: England
- Services: Advocacy, conferences, and events
- Executive Chair: Nadra Ahmed
- Funding: Members fees
- Website: nationalcareassociation.org.uk

The National Care Association is a British trade association for small and medium-sized care providers in England established in 1981. It is based in Rochester. It supports local care associations throughout England.

In 2021 it was frequently referred to in media coverage of the crisis in social care. Nadra Ahmed CBE, is Chair of the association.

== History ==
In September 2021 the association reported on a credit crunch as banks were refusing to lend money or provide new services for fear that the care sector was about to crumble. They said most care providers were at breaking point. Many of the sector's workers were put off by the compulsory COVID-19 vaccination policy at care homes and the association urged the Home Office to relax immigration rules for care providers. They estimated that 70,000 workers could leave the sector because of the compulsory covid vaccination policy.
