= Care England =

English charitable organization

- Founded: 9 December 1986; 39 years ago
- Type: Membership trade association
- Registration no.: 296103
- Legal status: Charitable company
- Purpose: "Representing the interests of a substantial percentage of the operators of adult social care services in England providing health and social care services"
- Headquarters: London, England, United Kingdom
- Region served: England
- Chief Executive: Prof. Martin Green OBE
- Chair: Angela Boxall
- Website: www.careengland.org.uk
- Formerly called: Independent Hospitals Association (1986-90); Independent Healthcare Association (1990-2004); English Community Care Association (2004-14)

Care England is a trade organisation for independent adult social care providers in England. It is the largest representative body for independent social care services in the UK. It is a registered charity based in London. Members provide a variety of services for older people and those with long term conditions, learning disabilities or mental health problems. Professor Martin Green OBE, has been the Chief Executive since 2007.

It pressures local councils and national government for improved funding and was particularly vocal in the COVID-19 pandemic in England, which caused issues for the sector.

It described the increase in the standard weekly rate per person from £183.92 to £187.60 and the higher rate of Funded Nursing Care from £253.02 to £258.08 announced in March 2021 as showing contempt for the sector, but it welcomed the subsequent extension of the total infection control fund, enabling enhanced infection control procedures.

It welcomed the extension of the shortage occupation list to senior care workers and registered managers in March 2021. Martin Green said “We hope that this is the start of a process towards the creation of a migration system which supports rather than undermines the development of the adult social care workforce.”

The Housing, Communities and Local Government Committee announced an enquiry into the likely legacy of the coronavirus pandemic in adult social care in March 2021. Professor Green welcomed the announcement but expressed his frustration that "yet more discussions" were needed to see the prime minister deliver on his promise for reform.

The organisation welcomed the decision of the Supreme Court of the United Kingdom in March 2021 that care workers were not entitled to the minimum wage for sleep-in shifts. Care England was represented in the case at the Court of Appeal stage. Their solicitor said: “The Supreme Court’s decision means UK care providers no longer face a potentially catastrophic financial outcome that could have jeopardised the care of thousands of people." Martin Green said "Care England continues to call for a ten year plan for adult social a key part of which is a workforce plan, akin to that of the NHS, where career progression, pay and rewards are identified."

In April 2021 it organised a letter to Boris Johnson, signed by many prominent leaders in health and social care, calling "for a long-term and sustainable future for social care".

In 2023, Care England warned that due to rising gas prices in England, one-third of aged care homes in the country were at risk of closing. According to the trade organization, heating bills for care organizations had risen by 500% despite gas prices falling.
