= Timeline of the COVID-19 pandemic in Wales (2021) =

2021 Welsh daily pandemic-related events

The following is a timeline of the COVID-19 pandemic in Wales during 2021. There are significant differences in the legislation and the reporting between the countries of the UK: England, Scotland, Northern Ireland, and Wales.

== Timeline ==
=== January 2021 ===
- 1 January –
  - South Wales Police release figures indicating there were 240 calls over New Year breaches of COVID regulations.
  - Figures indicate Wales is slightly behind the rest of the UK in rolling out the Pfizer/BioNTech vaccine, prompting politicians to express concern about the programme. In response, Health Minister Vaughan Gething says the programme is at the "very beginning" but rates of vaccinations are increasing.
- 2 January –
  - The number of COVID-19 tests carried out in Wales since the start of the pandemic passes two million, with 2,007,728 tests having been carried out. Of those, 151,300 have been positive, and there have been 3,564 COVID-related deaths.
  - BBC News reports that visits to beauty spots in Wales have been high in preceding days in spite of travel bans and people being urged to stay at home.
- 3 January –
  - Jo Stevens, the Shadow Secretary of State for Digital, Culture, Media and Sport and MP for Cardiff Central, is reported to be in hospital where she is receiving treatment for COVID-19.
  - Responding to calls from teaching unions to suspend face-to-face teaching, First Minister Mark Drakeford defends the Welsh Government's decision to allow a flexible approach to reopening schools after the Christmas break, describing it as a "safe return".
  - On the topic of restrictions, Drakeford says he does not "see much headroom for change" and that Wales is likely to remain in lockdown for the rest of January.
- 4 January –
  - Education Minister Kirsty Williams announces that all schools and colleges will remain closed and move to online learning until 18 January.
  - A Level student Cai Parry launches a campaign to close schools and have external examinations for 2021 replaced by teacher-based assessment, going on to describe the thought of taking an exam in the current climate as "panic-inducing".
- 5 January – Education Minister Kirsty Williams says that closing schools will have "grave consequences" for education.
- 6 January –
  - Betsi Cadwaladr health board apologises after one of its COVID vaccination centres experienced "significant" delays, attributing the problem to the training of "new vaccinators".
  - Dr Andrew Goodall, chief executive of NHS Wales, expresses concern that hospital levels could reach double those in April if admissions continue at the current rate.
- 7 January –
  - First Minister Mark Drakeford announces that schools and colleges in Wales will remain closed to most students until after the February half term unless there is a "significant" fall in the number of COVID cases.
  - A total of 49,403 people have received their first dose of COVID vaccine since 8 December, figures have revealed, with 14,000 doing so in the past week.
  - A nurse working for the Hywel Dda University Health Board has said she is "angry and upset" after testing positive for COVID three weeks after receiving the vaccination.
  - Car parks in Snowdonia are to be closed because of people visiting the site, in breach of COVID regulations.
- 8 January – The Welsh Government is in talks with major retailers about a tightening of COVID rules in supermarkets amid concerns about what First Minister Mark Drakeford describes as a lack of "visible protections" in supermarkets.
- 9 January –
  - Police say people are "blatantly" ignoring COVID restrictions after more than 100 cars were turned around at Moel Famau on the Flintshire border.
  - Unions have criticised some councils for refusing childcare to some key workers. The Welsh Government holds a list of jobs that are considered essential, but some councils have compiled their own list, which excludes jobs such as supermarket workers and teachers.
- 10 January –
  - During the first month of vaccine deployment, Wales has received 275,000 doses of COVID vaccines, 70,000 of which have been administered.
  - The Prison Officers' Association has called for courts to be closed in order to halt the spread of COVID in Welsh prisons after figures revealed a sharp increase in cases in jails.
  - The National Union of Students Wales has called for students to receive a partial refund of accommodation rent because they are not spending so much time at university.
- 11 January –
  - Research by the Intensive Care National Audit and Research Centre has found that half of COVID patients admitted to hospital in Wales over the winter have died.
  - The Welsh Government announces that everyone aged 50 and over, as well as those who are considered to be at greater risk, will be offered a COVID vaccine by the spring.
- 12 January –
  - Office for National Statistics figures show there were 5,100 COVID deaths from the start of the pandemic up to and including 1 January, with 310 in the week up to that date.
  - Sophie Howe, Wales's Future Generations Commissioner, calls for a national approach to online learning, which she has described as "patchy and inconsistent".
  - Disability campaigners have called for adults with learning disabilities who live in supported accommodation to have high priority for COVID vaccination.
- 13 January – Hundreds of students are reportedly preparing to take part in a rent strike over accommodation they have hardly used during the 2020–21 academic year.
- 14 January –
  - First Minister Mark Drakeford announces plans to introduce stronger measures to "protect" supermarket workers during the pandemic, these to be announced the next day.
  - Community Pharmacy Wales, a group representing pharmacies in Wales, says there is an "urgent need" to use pharmacies to help deploy the vaccine in Wales.
- 15 January –
  - First Minister Mark Drakeford announces that new laws will be introduced to protect supermarket shoppers and staff, which will include the erection of signs reminding people to socially distance. The announcement comes after "significant evidence" the virus is spreading in supermarkets.
  - Figures published by Public Health Wales indicate that COVID cases in the worst affected areas, including Wrexham and the South Wales Valleys, have started to fall.
  - The Law Society calls for a two-week firebreak of non-custodial cases in magistrates and crown courts following a rise in COVID cases in the court system.
- 17 January – Following criticism of the pace at which vaccinations are being given in Wales, Dr Gill Richardson, chair of Wales' vaccination board, says the NHS in Wales is being given as many vaccines as it can cope with.
- 18 January –
  - Both Health Minister Vaughan Gething and First Minister Mark Drakeford have denied that COVID vaccines are being held back after Gething told a BBC journalist the supply has to last until February to prevent "vaccinators standing around with nothing to do".
  - A sharp rise in the number of COVID cases among children in Anglesey is being blamed on the new strain of COVID.
- 19 January –
  - Senedd officials are investigating an incident in which a group of politicians drank alcohol on Senedd premises in early December 2020, days after pubs were stopped from serving it.
  - Health Minister Vaughan Gething tells BBC Radio 5 Live there is an "increasing urgency and an increasing pace of delivery" of vaccinations in Wales.
- 20 January –
  - Education Minister Kirsty Williams announces that GCSE, AS and A Level grades in summer 2021 will be based on teacher assessment after a scheme designed to replace end-of-year exams was scrapped in November 2020.
  - Three Senedd politicians who were seen drinking in the parliament building have apologised for their actions.
- 21 January –
  - Health Minister Vaughan Gething is accused of providing misleading information after claiming that nearly all of the people in Wales over the age of 80 had been vaccinated, when the number is less than that.
  - Education Minister Kirsty Williams says that schools may be given two weeks notice before face-to-face learning restarts.
  - Welsh Labour suspends Senedd member Alun Davies from the party after he was pictured drinking alcohol in the Senedd building after Wales introduced a ban on drinking alcohol.
- 22 January –
  - The Welsh Government says the flooding caused by Storm Christoph has had "no adverse effects" on the rollout of COVID vaccinations.
  - First Minister Mark Drakeford says it is "unlikely" there will be a "wholesale" return to school after the February half-term.
- 23 January –
  - Paul Davies, leader of the Welsh Conservatives, and fellow Senedd member Darren Millar, both announce they are stepping down after they were pictured drinking alcohol in the Senedd building.
  - Four vaccination centres in Bridgend, Rhondda, Abercynon and Merthyr Tydfil are closed temporarily due to the forecast of snowy weather for Wales for the following day.
  - Betsi Cadwaladr health board's chairman Mark Polin criticises staff at a council who shared email links in order to queue jump the COVID vaccination process.
  - The Welsh Government announces it has set aside £180m to help tourism in Wales to recover from the financial impact of the pandemic.
  - The Welsh branch of the British Medical Association has joined calls for the time between first and second vaccines to be halved from twelve to six weeks, saying a delay of too long is "entirely unacceptable and potentially dangerous".
- 24 January –
  - The Public and Commercial Services Union urges ministers to act after figures reveal that 500 people at the DVLA in Swansea have contracted COVID-19 since the beginning of the pandemic.
  - A Royal College of Nursing survey has found that 80% of nurses feel more stressed because of the COVID situation.
  - Figures released by Barnardo's Cymru indicate that family breakdowns during the COVID crisis have led to an increase of a third in the number of children needing urgent foster care between April and December.
  - Andrew RT Davies is chosen to succeed Paul Davies as leader of the Welsh Conservatives.
- 25 January – Health Minister Vaughan Gething says that it is unclear whether the target of vaccinating 70% of over-80s and care home residents has been met.
- 26 January –
  - Sally Holland, the Children's Commissioner for Wales, urges the Welsh Government to outline its strategy for returning face-to-face education.
  - Vaccination figures indicate 52% of people aged 80 and over had received their first COVID vaccine by the preceding weekend, falling short of the Welsh Government's target of 70%; the Welsh Government blames the recent poor weather conditions for missing its target.
  - Figures for the week ending 15 January indicate Wales had its highest number of COVID-related deaths that week, with 467 deaths.
- 27 January –
  - Dr Rob Orford, Wales's Chief Scientific Adviser, confirms that 10 cases of the South African COVID variant have been identified in Wales.
  - Jim Jones, the chief executive of North Wales Tourism, says it is "crucial" tourism is allowed to reopen by Easter following a "catastrophic" year for the sector.
- 28 January – The Welsh Government launches a new strategy for tackling COVID-19 that includes a greater community-led approach to tackling local COVID spikes, as well as a trial involving people without symptoms to see whether they can safely go to work or school.
- 29 January –
  - First Minister Mark Drakeford extends the Alert level four lockdown for a further three weeks, but announces that from the following day two people from different households may meet up outside for exercise. Drakeford also suggests primary age schoolchildren may be able to return to the classroom following the February half-term.
  - COVID vaccination appointments in Powys are brought forward amid weather warnings for heavy snow over the forthcoming weekend.
- 30 January –
  - Two COVID vaccination centres and a test centre are forced to stay closed because of snowfall.
  - The Welsh Government extends the current shielding period for the 130,000 people shielding in Wales from 7 February to 31 March.
- 31 January – Gwent Police announce the breakup of two parties the previous day resulting in over 20 people receiving fines for breach of COVID rules.

=== February 2021 ===
- 1 February – The Welsh Government confirms that anyone in Wales asked to self-isolate by the NHS COVID-19 app can apply for £500.
- 2 February – Nine cases of South African variant COVID-19 have been identified in Wales, with a further four under investigation, officials say.
- 3 February –
  - Public Health Wales has identified three cases of the South African COVID variant that have no links to travel in the area.
  - Crime figures from October 2019 to October 2020 have indicated a general fall in overall crime during the first few months of the pandemic, but an increase in crimes such as cyberstalking and harassment.
- 4 February – Health officials have found a travel link to one of three South African COVID variant cases, but the source of the other two remains unclear.
- 5 February –
  - Education Minister Kirsty Williams confirms that schoolchildren aged between three and seven will return to school from 22 February, along with some older pupils on vocational courses.
  - First Minister Mark Drakeford suggests that parts of the tourism and hospitality industry, including caravan parks, could reopen by April subject to a fall in the number of COVID cases.
  - Wrexham centenarian Hilda Richards, 103, who lived through the Spanish flu pandemic, is given her first COVID vaccination.
  - Figures have shown that in increase in online shopping has led to a boom in recycling in Wales during the latest lockdown.
- 6 February –
  - The latest figures show that more than 550,000 people in the top priority groups have been given their first COVID vaccinations in Wales, or 17.7% of the population.
  - Police have been increasing their presence in Penarth after local residents complained about the number of people visiting the coastal town, and consequently breaking lockdown restrictions.
  - Tourism bosses have asked for clarity from the Welsh Government over when and how Wales will come out of lockdown.
- 7 February –
  - First Minister Mark Drakeford reveals that his wife and mother-in-law have been vaccinated for COVID-19, but that he is yet to receive his vaccine.
  - James Price, chief executive of Transport for Wales announces the completion of the South Wales Metro, scheduled for completion in 2023, will be delayed by some months because of the COVID crisis.
- 8 February –
  - A further 12 deaths take the total number of COVID deaths in Wales past 5,000 to 5,001.
  - The number of people receiving their first COVID vaccine passes 600,000, meaning 19.2% of the Welsh population has now been vaccinated.
  - People over the age of 70 or classed as extremely clinical vulnerable and who have not received a COVID vaccination are urged to contact the NHS for an appointment.
  - Health Minister Vaughan Gething suggests that people may need "booster" COVID injections in the future once more is known about mutations of the virus.
- 9 February –
  - The latest weekly figures from the Office for National Statistics show a fall in the number of COVID deaths, with 361 deaths in the most recent week, a drop of 86 from the preceding week.
  - Premier Inn is investigating an alleged breach of COVID rules at one of its hotels after the Daily Post published a photograph of a group of ten people having a party in what is said to be the restaurant area of the hotel.
- 10 February –
  - Andrew Goodall, the Chief Executive of NHS Wales, says there are "encouraging signs" COVID cases in Wales are falling.
  - First Minister Mark Drakeford confirms that Wales has become the first of the UK's four nations to vaccinate 20% of its population against COVID-19, and "one of the first countries in the world to do so".
- 11 February –
  - The Welsh Government says it is set to become the first of the Home Nations to offer everyone in the top four priority groups their first vaccination.
  - A report produced by Sally Holland, the Children's Commissioner for Wales, highlights the devastating impact the pandemic is having on children and young people, with 30% of those aged 17 and 18 surveyed saying they felt worried most of the time.
- 12 February – First Minister Mark Drakeford confirms that "cautious" talks have begun about reopening tourism in Wales for Easter.
- 13 February – Kelechi Nnoaham, director for public health at Cwm Taf Morgannwg, has suggested that poverty and inequality are behind the high number of COVID deaths in the South Wales Valleys. In response the Welsh Government says that an "unprecedented series of interventions" were introduced to protect people's health.
- 14 February –
  - Bow Street railway station opens to the public, with plans for its opening kept under wraps in order to prevent inquisitive people from breaching lockdown rules.
  - Business2Schools, a charity that distributes laptops and other refurbished pieces of technology to children, has said the drive to supply all schoolchildren with laptops for home study during the pandemic is falling short.
- 15 February –
  - As figures show one in four people in Wales has been vaccinated against COVID, Dr Dr Gill Richardson, who is in charge of the vaccination programme in Wales, says that it can now "fly", and that ongoing studies are being conducted into whether it will need to be a regular vaccine similar to the flu jab.
  - As Wales prepares to announce its pathway out of lockdown in the coming days, Health Minister Vaughan Gething says that future lockdowns cannot be ruled out.
- 16 February –
  - The number of COVID-related deaths in Wales passes 7,000, and reaches 7,089, but figures from the Office for National Statistics show the number of weekly deaths has fallen for the third week in succession.
  - NSPCC Wales says the number of referrals to police over parents' alcohol and substance abuse has increased.
  - Mind Cymru has warned against the use of antidepressants as a "sticking-plaster" after health figures have also shown an increase in the number of antidepressants being prescribed to people during the pandemic, but that referrals to therapists have decreased.
- 17 February – Public Health Wales confirms a further four cases of South African variant COVID-19 in Wales, bringing the total there so far to 17.
- 19 February – First Minister Mark Drakeford sets out some plans for reopening society in Wales. Lockdown measures will remain in place for a further three weeks, but are slightly changed to allow four people from two separate households to meet up outside for exercise from Saturday 20 February. Drakeford expresses hope that primary school children over the age of eight will return to school from 15 March, and some hairdressers and non-essential shops can also reopen in March.
- 21 February – Education Minister Kirsty Williams says she is confident more primary school pupils will return to school on 15 March is COVID cases continue to fall.
- 22 February –
  - As pupils aged three to seven return to school, Education Minister Kirsty Williams expresses her hope that all pupils in Wales should be back at school by the end of the Easter Holiday on 12 April.
  - The Welsh Government unveils plans to help regenerate town centres as part of the post-COVID recovery, with an extra £270m to help businesses struggling because of the pandemic.
  - The Federation of Small Businesses urges the Welsh Government to provide details on the conditions needed to lift lockdown restrictions, saying there has been a "radio silence" on the issue.
  - Pet boarding businesses have urged the Welsh Government to provide help, saying they have "fallen through the loopholes" of most COVID support packages.
- 23 February – Following criticism of the Welsh Government's school reopening policy by the Welsh Conservatives, First Minister Mark Drakeford has responded by saying it is "not safe" to reopen schools in one go.
- 24 February –
  - Measures introduced during the pandemic that extended the notice landlords must give their tenants to leave a property from two to six months are to be made permanent with the Renting Homes (Amendment) (Wales) Bill.
  - Colleges Wales suggests that students studying practical subjects such as plumbing and engineering will have "inevitably" struggled during the pandemic as it will not have been possible for them to carry out practical work for several months.
- 25 February – The majority of planned surgery is cancelled at Ysbyty Gwynedd in Bangor following an outbreak of COVID at the hospital.
- 26 February – The Swansea Bay and Hywel Dda health boards are to offer COVID tests to anyone with flu symptoms and/or who is feeling unwell after coming into contact with a person testing positive for COVID, going beyond national recommendations.
- 27 February –
  - Families with a child under the age of one are permitted to form a bubble with one other household.
  - The Welsh Government confirms over a million COVID vaccines have been administered in Wales, with 916,336 people receiving their first dose, and 89,053 their second, giving a collective total of 1,005,389.
  - As Wales enjoys a weekend of mild, sunny weather, police are patrolling beauty spots to ensure people continue to adhere to the restrictions. Local authorities close a number of beach car parks at the request of police as the weekend progresses.
- 28 February – On the date that marks a year since the first COVID case was confirmed in Wales, Health Minister Vaughan Gething says the country could "definitely have done things differently".

=== March 2021 ===
- 1 March – A study published by the University of Cardiff reveals that emergency teams saw a "rapid and sustained" fall in violent injuries during the Spring 2020 lockdown.
- 3 March –
  - Senior pharmacist Andrew Evans suggests as many as 30,000 COVID vaccines could be delivered each day by the following week after a large rise in supplies of vaccines to Wales.
  - A report compiled by the Senedd's cross-party economy committee recommends that young people should be given access to training or work to avoid them becoming "scarred" by the economic impact of COVID-19.
- 4 March –
  - First Minister Mark Drakeford confirms he is self-isolating after coming into contact with someone who has tested positive for COVID-19.
  - Drakeford suggests that with COVID cases in Wales "significantly lower" than in England there could be "opportunities" for some parts of the Welsh economy to reopen earlier than in England.
  - Professor Sir Mansel Aylward, ex-chairman of Public Health Wales, says that not enough preparation was done in the UK to prepare for a pandemic such as the COVID-19 outbreak, which was "completely underestimated".
  - GCSE and A Level students in Wales are to be given provisional results by their teachers in June, ahead of official results in August, it is announced.
- 5 March – Welsh Government ministers have said they will not cap pay increases for NHS staff after the UK government faced a backlash for giving NHS staff in England a 1% pay rise.
- 7 March – Figures from Traffic Wales and the Welsh Government indicate that traffic on Welsh roads has been 60% higher than in the first lockdown in March 2020, while many areas have seen a doubling in the amount of traffic in recent weeks.
- 8 March – COVID case rates and positivity rates have now dropped below the level they were at the point when lockdown measures were triggered.
- 9 March – Public Health Wales confirms the number of people vaccinated in Wales has passed one million, with 1,007,391 people (31% of the population) having received a first vaccine by the previous evening.
- 10 March –
  - The Early Years Action Group of children's charities have warned children under two have missed out on important social interaction and development because of the COVID pandemic, and may subsequently experience problems later in life.
  - A hearing of the Senedd Health Committee hears that some patients with Long COVID "were told to go away and get on with things" by their GPs.
- 11 March –
  - Staff at the DVLA in Swansea vote to take industrial action over concerns about COVID safety after more than 500 cases at the Agency.
  - A report produced by the Welsh Government's Technical Advisory Cell warns Wales could face an "exponential growth" of COVID cases if lockdown measures are eased too quickly, and recommends keeping restrictions at level alert three until June.
- 12 March –
  - First Minister Mark Drakeford announces an easing of lockdown restrictions, with four people from two separate households allowed to meet up outdoors from the following day and a replacement of the stay at home order with a stay local order, along with the reopening of hairdressers from Monday 15 March. Primary school children and those in secondary qualification years will also return to face-to-face lessons from 15 March. Further easing of measures will see garden centres reopen from 22 March, self-contained holiday accommodation reopening from 27 March and non-essential retail reopening from 12 April. However, although self-contained tourism is allowed to reopen, Drakeford warns that future reopenings will be halted if tourist operators are found to be booking reservations from people living outside Wales.
  - A vigil planned for the following day to honour London woman Sarah Everard, whose remains were found in woodland in Ashford, Kent, is moved online because of concerns about its legality as a public gathering during the COVID-19 pandemic, but a vigil planned for Carmarthen will still go ahead.
- 14 March – Health Minister Vaughan Gething receives his first COVID vaccination, and urges members of the BAME community to get vaccinated.
- 15 March –
  - A demonstration is held outside a Cardiff police station following the death of Sarah Everard which is attended by several hundred; protestors also gather to demonstrate on other issues, including Black Lives Matter.
  - Hospital admissions are at their lowest point of the pandemic, with an average of 37 per day in the week ending 14 March; the figure is lower than August 2020.
  - Betsi Cadwaladr health board confirms that of 39 patients being treated for COVID-19 at Ysbyty Gwynedd in Bangor, 17 have caught it while in hospital.
- 17 March –
  - The Welsh Government announces that the 222,000 healthcare workers within NHS Wales will receive a one-off payment amounting to £735 which, after tax and national insurance deductions will see them receive £500 in their bank accounts.
  - The British Medical Association has warned that many healthcare staff are not getting the lateral flow COVID tests they were promised a year ago.
- 18 March –
  - Wales will receive 250,000 fewer vaccines over the next month due to a reduced supply of UK vaccines.
  - Data shows that flu infections have experienced a "remarkable" suppression, with 18 cases recorded in Wales over the winter.
- 19 March –
  - Rugby fans are warned to stay at home to watch Wales's 2021 Six Nations Championship match against France, scheduled for the next day, and in which Wales will bid to secure a Grand Slam.
  - Residents of Holyhead and Holy Island are warned against all but essential travel as the area experiences a COVID flare up. Case rates in the area are at 503.8 per 100,000, compared to 127.1 for the whole of Anglesey and 44 for Wales as a whole.
- 21 March – First Minister Mark Drakeford has described England's roadmap to exiting lockdown restrictions as being "at the very optimistic end of the spectrum" and says he does not believe Wales will return to normal in 2021.
- 22 March – Garden centres are permitted to reopen, while supermarkets can once again sell non-essential items.
- 23 March –
  - Pam Kelly, Chief Constable of Gwent Police, calls for frontline police officers to be prioritised for the COVID vaccine. The Welsh Government in response says there is insufficient evidence to support vaccination by occupation.
  - Qualifications Wales says there will be differences to secondary school assessments in 2022, but hopes that public examinations will go ahead.
- 24 March –
  - Extra COVID tests are being deployed in Holyhead amid a "concerning" rise in positive cases.
  - Statistics published by HM Treasury suggest the pandemic has widened financial inequality in Wales.
- 27 March –
  - Wales becomes the first UK nation to lift travel restrictions within its borders as the "stay local" rule is ended. Self-contained tourist accommodation, such as cottages and some hotels, is also permitted to reopen.
  - Data from the NHS Wales Shared Services Partnership shows an average of 14 million items of PPE have been delivered to health care providers each week since May 2020.
- 28 March – Andrew Evans, Wales's chief pharmacist, says that second vaccinations will be prioritised during April as a result of a slowdown in supplies of the Oxford–AstraZeneca vaccine.
- 29 March –
  - As figures from Cardiff City Council indicate homelessness in Cardiff has been reduced by 90% on its pre-pandemic levels, homeless charity Crisis calls for efforts to keep people off the streets.
  - The Welsh Government gives golfers at Llanymynech Golf Club, whose course is in both England and Wales, permission to cross the border while playing a round of golf. The club had previously advised people from England could be fined if they crossed the border into Wales while playing a round of golf.
- 30 March –
  - Headteachers and teaching unions have expressed their concern that too much pressure may be placed on pupils because of teacher-based assessments as schools attempt to justify grades.
  - The Welsh Government has launched an inquiry after figures revealed a large number of people have not turned up for vaccine appointments, and urges people to attend the appointments when they are called. The volume of no-shows is subsequently attributed to invitation letters arriving too late and the difficulty associated with trying to cancel or rearrange appointments.
  - No further COVID deaths are recorded for the most recent 24 hour period.
  - Office for National Statistics figures show the number of COVID-related deaths in Wales has fallen for a ninth successive week, with 49 deaths in the week ending 26 March.
- 31 March –
  - NHS Wales research suggests that many of the technical innovations that were deployed during the pandemic, such as videoconferencing and patient apps, may help to shape the future direction of the health service.
  - South Wales Police warn the public against illegal gatherings after a large crowd was dispersed in the Cardiff Bay area the previous day. South Wales Police report that three officers were injured when people began throwing missiles, while two arrests were made.

=== April 2021 ===
- 1 April –
  - First Minister Mark Drakeford says that Wales is set to become the first UK nation to offer all nine top priority groups a first COVID vaccine, and is on track to do so by Easter Sunday (4 April).
  - Ceredigion achieves the lowest number of COVID cases of any mainland UK county, with three positive cases in the preceding week.
  - A spike in COVID cases in the Clase area of Swansea has been linked to people attending parties and visiting each other at home.
- 2 April –
  - Large crowds gather in Cardiff Bay for the second time in under a week in spite of remaining COVID restrictions.
  - Good weather results in an influx of visitors to Wales's beauty spots.
- 3 April – Police officers are given powers to prohibit people from the Cardiff Bay area following recent large gatherings there.
- 4 April – The NASUWT calls for the Welsh Government to delay planned changes to the school curriculum scheduled for 2022 to allow teachers to help pupils catch up with work missed because of the pandemic.
- 5 April – The latest figures from Public Health Wales show that 1,490,372 people have received their first COVID vaccine, and 467,683 their second, while First Minister Mark Drakeford confirms that Wales has hit its target of offering a vaccine to all nine of the top priority groups. This claim is subsequently disputed the following day by people in the priority groups who say they are yet to be contacted.
- 6 April – Staff at the DVLA in Swansea begin a four-day strike over concerns about COVID safety at the Agency.
- 7 April –
  - Elle Taylor, 24, from Ammanford becomes the first person in the UK to receive the Moderna COVID-19 vaccine at Glangwili Hospital in Carmarthen, as rollout of the third COVID vaccine to be approved for use in the UK begins.
  - Aberystwyth University becomes the latest university in Wales to take the decision not to hold graduation ceremonies in summer 2021 because of COVID.
- 8 April –
  - The Welsh Government moves the easing of some lockdown measures forward by a week due to a drop in COVID cases. Consequently, outdoor weddings involving up to 30 people will be allowed from 26 April rather than 3 May, while the reopening of gyms and leisure centres is moved forward from 10 May to 3 May. Two households will also be able to form an extended bubble from 3 May, this also having been moved forward a week.
  - Dr Richard Roberts, head of Wales's vaccination rollout, confirms one person in Wales has developed a rare blood clot following administration of the Oxford–AstraZeneca vaccine.
- 10 April –
  - Data from Public Health Wales indicates that Bridgend, which at the peak of the pandemic had a case rate of 1,118.7 per 100,000 (the highest in the UK) now has one of the lowest case rates for the preceding week, with 4.1 cases per 100,000.
  - A group of 300 protestors gather in Cardiff to call for gyms in Wales to be reopened on 12 April; they are scheduled to open on 3 May.
- 12 April –
  - Non-essential retail and close contact services are allowed to resume, while people from Wales are allowed to travel to other parts of the UK.
  - Figures from Public Health Wales show hospital admissions from COVID-19 have hit an all-time low, with a daily average of 18 over the seven days up to 11 April.
- 14 April –
  - The Welsh Government announces that anyone in Wales who cannot work remotely will be entitled to free lateral flow tests from Friday 16 April.
  - Staff from a surgery in Tenby travel to Caldey Island off the Pembrokeshire Coast to vaccinate monks at a Cistercian monastery.
  - Bollards and rubber kerbs installed in the North Wales town of Llangollen to help people with social distancing are to be removed after being described as a "death trap" because multiple people have tripped or fallen over them.
- 15 April – With Wales yet to set a reopening date for indoor activities for children, those running businesses for parenting groups say they have been forgotten and urge the Welsh Government to give them clarity on when they can resume.
- 16 April –
  - Health officials urge women not to stop taking the pill following reports of an increased risk of blood clots from the Oxford–AstraZeneca vaccine.
  - Leaders of Wales's tourism taskforce have called on the Welsh Government to bring forward the date for reopening indoor hospitality to 17 May, matching it with England and Scotland.
- 18 April –
  - The island of Caldey will reopen to tourists from 1 May, it is confirmed.
  - Leading doctors say that rebuilding the NHS after the COVID-19 pandemic could be a bigger challenge than dealing with the pandemic itself.
- 19 April – First Minister Mark Drakeford announces the further easing of COVID rules, allowing six people from six separate households to meet up outdoors from Saturday 24 April, and outdoor hospitality from Monday 26 April.
- 20 April – Figures published by Public Health Wales indicate that vaccine uptake among black, Asian and other ethnic minority groups is 10% lower than in white communities, though the gap has narrowed slightly since February.
- 21 April –
  - First Minister Mark Drakeford is criticised by opposition politicians for "completely inappropriate" behaviour after indicating his intention to use a government press conference to outline how COVID restrictions will be further eased if Welsh Labour wins the 2021 Senedd election.
  - Health officials are working with a cupcake factory based in Bala, Gwynedd, after 42 members of its production staff tested positive for COVID-19.
- 22 April –
  - First Minister Mark Drakeford confirms indoor hospitality will reopen on 17 May, while indoor activities for children such as soft play and swimming lessons are brought forward to 3 May. Up to 15 adults can also meet for indoor activities from 3 May.
  - Data published by Stats Wales shows NHS Wales has a waiting list backlog of more than half a million.
- 23 April – Jersey takes steps to reopen tourism by introducing a traffic lights system for different countries depending on their COVID status, and adds Wales (with the exception of Newport) to the green list, meaning travel between the two countries is now permitted without the need for quarantine.
- 24 April – Six people from six separate households are allowed to meet up outdoors in a further easing of COVID rules.
- 26 April – Pubs, restaurants and cafes are reopened, allowing up to six people to meet in an outdoor hospitality setting. Zoos, theme parks and other outdoor attractions are also reopened, while wedding and funeral receptions can have up to 30 attendees in an outdoor setting.
- 27 April –
  - The latest figures from the Office for National Statistics show that over half of the council areas in Wales had no COVID related deaths in the week up to 16 April, with 14 deaths occurring in Wales during that week.
  - The Royal College of Radiologists (RCR) warns of a shortage of radiologists in Wales that could put patients at risk and make it "extremely difficult" to reduce waiting lists that have built up over the pandemic.
- 29 April – A total of 68 cases of COVID have now been confirmed at a cupcake factory in Bala.
- 30 April – As the May bank holiday weekend approaches, South Wales Police step up patrols in areas that saw breaches of COVID rules over the Easter weekend.

=== May 2021 ===
- 3 May –
  - Gyms, swimming pools and community centres reopen, while three households can meet up indoors when a member of one of those households lives alone.
  - Staff at the critical care unit of the University Hospital of Wales in Cardiff are creating a woodland to offset the carbon emissions and waste generated from the machines needed to treat COVID patients.
  - A study carried out by Swansea University warns that disposable face masks could be releasing chemical pollutants such as metals and nano-plastics into the environment, and urges better regulations and more research into the matter.
- 5 May – Figures from NHS Wales show hospital admissions to be at their lowest since the start of the pandemic, with an average of 227 people in hospital during the preceding week.
- 7 May – Denbighshire has the lowest rate of COVID cases on the UK mainland after no infections were recorded in the seven days up to 1 May.
- 8 May – After Welsh Labour wins the 2021 Senedd election, First Minister Mark Drakeford attributes the party's success to its handling of the COVID crisis.
- 11 May –
  - First Minister Mark Drakeford confirms that up to six people from six separate households will be able to meet up indoors in pubs, cafes and restaurants from Monday 17 May. Extra financial support for hospitality sector companies affected by the COVID crisis is also announced.
  - The Welsh Government announces a pilot scheme to trial the return of large public gatherings, with a list of sporting events and music concerts earmarked for public attendance. The first gathering will be an Eid celebration at Cardiff Castle scheduled to take place at the end of the Muslim holy month of Ramadan.
- 12 May – Cwm Taf Morgannwg Health Board confirms it has had no COVID patients in its critical care units for at least three weeks, and no admissions to hospital for two weeks; the area was one of the worst hit at the height of the pandemic.
- 13 May –
  - Following the Senedd election, Eluned Morgan is appointed as Health Minister, replacing Vaughan Gething.
  - Figures show that 36.6% of people aged under 30 in Wales have received a first COVID jab, with that number rising to almost half in some areas.
  - The BBC reports that people in Wales will be urged to continue to travel abroad only for "essential reasons" for a further three weeks after 17 May.
- 14 May – Dr Phil Banfield, of BMA Wales, has claimed doctors in Wales have faced bullying and disciplinary action for raising concerns about COVID safety in hospitals.
- 15 May – Several hundred people attend the Welsh language Tafwyl music festival at Cardiff Castle, the second of nine pilot events trialling the gathering of large crowds.
- 16 May – The number of people to receive their first COVID vaccine in Wales passes two million, with figures published by Public Health Wales showing that 2,019,160 people (64% of the population) have had their first dose, while 915,674 (29%) have received their second.
- 17 May –
  - Indoor hospitality is reopened in the latest easing of restrictions, with pubs and restaurants allowed to serve drinks, while galleries and museums are also reopened.
  - New Health Minister Eluned Morgan says that targeted vaccination has not been ruled out as a way of tackling the spread of Indian variant COVID.
- 18 May –
  - Public Health Wales warns people "not to become complacent" after the number of Indian variant COVID cases more than doubles in a week to 25.
  - First Minister Mark Drakeford says it is likely Wales will begin vaccinating children later in the year, with children as young as 12 being offered the COVID vaccine.
- 19 May –
  - Wales records a day without any COVID related deaths, with figures from Public Health Wales showing only one death in which COVID was mentioned during the preceding week. Collectively, 5,560 people have died within 28 days of testing positive for COVID in Wales since the beginning of the pandemic.
  - In response to comments made by First Minister Mark Drakeford the previous day, the World Health Organization urges Wales to consider donating vaccines to poorer countries before vaccinating children.
  - The Indian COVID variant could be 50% more transmissible than a strain identified in the UK in 2020, First Minister Mark Drakeford has said.
- 20 May –
  - Swansea Bay University Health Board warns people to keep socially distancing and get vaccinated as the number of cases of Indian variant COVID in Wales rises to 28.
  - Office for National Statistics figures show that COVID was the 18th most common cause of death in Wales during April, with 35 deaths recorded.
- 21 May – Figures published by Action Fraud indicate that reports of fraud in Wales have risen by 25% since the start of the pandemic.
- 23 May – The number of people to receive both COVID vaccines passes a million, with figures from Public Health Wales showing 1,000,706 have had their second vaccine. The figure equates to a third of the population.
- 24 May –
  - The rules regarding care home visits are changed, permitting anyone to visit, although residents are still only allowed to have two visitors at a time.
  - Chief Medical Officer Dr Frank Atherton says people "should be worried" about a resurgence of COVID cases after the number of cases of Indian variant COVID increase to "around 57".
  - Swim Wales, the governing body for swimming in Wales, says there are "grave concerns" for the future of public swimming pools in Wales because of the financial impact of the COVID-19 pandemic, with one in ten – roughly 30 pools – facing closure.
- 26 May –
  - First Minister Mark Drakeford urges people coming to Wales for holidays to pack lateral flow test kits if they are from areas of England with high rates of Indian variant COVID.
  - Following an inspection of eight vaccination centres, Health Inspectorate Wales has said they provide a "safe and efficient" environment for the rollout of the vaccine.
- 27 May –
  - The Welsh Government confirms that live music events can return with immediate effect, but for live performances rather than nightclubs. Venues will need to undergo a safety assessment in line with hospitality and performing guidance.
  - A Public Health Wales report highlights the disproportionate effect of the COVID pandemic on those aged 16–24, who are more likely to be employed in sectors that were forced to close during the crisis.
- 28 May – People in areas of North Wales are urged to be cautious following the discovery of a cluster of cases of Indian variant COVID.
- 29 May – A University College London study finds that the number of people in Wales sticking rigidly to COVID rules has dropped by a third, a trend attributed to mixed messages causing confusion.
- 30 May – Health Minister Eluned Morgan says it is going to be "very difficult to hold the waters back" of Indian variant COVID from coming over the border into Wales from England.
- 31 May – After a BBC investigation reveals that child protection orders in Wales have fallen by 20% during the pandemic, social workers express concern that a generation of children have been left "traumatised" and are being overlooked, and they claim the figures paint an untrue picture.

=== June 2021 ===
- 1 June – Wales's Test, Trace, Protect scheme is extended to March 2022 to help tackle new variants of the virus.
- 2 June –
  - Health Minister Eluned Morgan describes a cluster of Indian variant COVID in Conwy County as "very serious" and suggests it could delay the easing of restrictions across Wales.
  - Morgan announces £25m investment to upgrade NHS diagnostics equipment to help deal with the backlog of people waiting for scans.
- 3 June – The Welsh Government announces that groups of up to 30 can meet outdoors from Monday 7 June and outdoor events can restart, while extended households can expand to include a third from the same day.
- 4 June –
  - The Welsh Retail Consortium has warned that lower retail footfall since shops reopened in Wales has left the sector facing a "precarious picture".
  - First Minister Mark Drakeford warns social distancing measures could remain in Wales for the rest of 2021.
- 6 June –
  - Health Minister Eluned Morgan suggests a third wave of COVID infections is inevitable and "the question is how big will this wave be".
  - Figures from Public Health Wales indicate there have been no COVID related deaths in Wales for the past ten days.
- 7 June –
  - The Welsh Government confirms that all adults in Wales will have been offered their first vaccine by Monday 14 June.
  - No COVID deaths are recorded in Wales for a 12th successive day.
  - Hywel Williams, Member of Parliament for Arfon, urges Transport for Wales and the Welsh Government to urgently review COVID travel safety policy after images of overcrowded trains were posted on social media over the preceding weekend, as people headed for the coast during hot weather.
- 8 June – Health chiefs express concern about the rising number of cases of Indian variant COVID as rules are relaxed.
- 10 June – Volunteers in Wrexham are given a third dose of COVID vaccine as part of a UK-wide trial to determine the effectiveness of a booster jab.
- 13 June – Leading economist Professor Gerald Holtham says that education should not be the "punchbag" that takes a financial hit as Wales recovers from the COVID crisis.
- 14 June –
  - Figures from Public Health Wales indicate the Indian variant COVID to be the most dominant in Wales, with 315 cases reported so far.
  - The Welsh Government confirms that all adults in Wales have been offered their first COVID vaccination, an achievement several weeks ahead of the UK national target.
- 15 June – Denbighshire council blames the increase in instances of Indian variant COVID on teenagers gathering together.
- 17 June –
  - Dr Andrew Goodall, chief executive of NHS Wales, says the health service is under "substantial pressure" with 600,000 people on hospital waiting lists.
  - Wales reports 140 new cases of COVID but no deaths related to the illness.
  - BBC News reports that no significant changes in COVID restrictions are likely for Wales until July because of concerns about the Indian variant. The rules regarding numbers at wedding and funeral gatherings will be relaxed though from Monday 21 June, with the numbers allowed dependent on a specific venue.
- 18 June – First Minister Mark Drakeford confirms the lifting of COVID restrictions in Wales will be postponed for four weeks, and warns the country is at the start of a third wave of COVID. During the four weeks a further 500,000 vaccinations are planned, mostly second doses.
- 19 June – The Welsh Government announces that congregations will be allowed to sing in churches and other places of worship providing they wear masks while doing so. Chanting and the playing of musical instruments is also permitted again.
- 20 June – It is reported a document produced by the Welsh Government's Technical Advisory Group of scientists has suggested that 80% of the population will either need to have been vaccinated or infected with COVID to stop ongoing transmission.
- 21 June –
  - The rules for comedy clubs and music venues are brought into line with those for the hospitality sector, allowing groups of six people to attend performances. Numbers at wedding and funeral receptions are also relaxed, with the number of attendees dependent on the venue.
  - As schools across Wales begin awarding provisional exam grades there are concerns some pupils will be left in "limbo" for several weeks while they wait for the grades to be confirmed. University offers will also not be made until after 10 August, the day A Level grades are officially confirmed.
- 22 June – First Minister Mark Drakeford says that people in Wales will be able to access digital vaccination certificates in the next few days.
- 25 June –
  - Wales becomes the first of the Home Nations to fully vaccinate more than 50% of its population, with 1,591,322 people (or 50.5%) receiving both injections.
  - First Minister Mark Drakeford says that measures such as wearing face coverings may change from being legal requirements to advice once all adults have been vaccinated.
- 28 June – Education Minister Jeremy Miles tells a press conference he wants to minimise the number of schoolchildren in Wales who are required to self-isolate.
- 30 June –
  - Teaching staff and unions urge the Welsh Government to provide clarity for 2022's school examinations following a fraught process for 2021 assessments.
  - Patients with Long COVID have called for better access to treatment, such as specialist clinics for the condition.

=== July 2021 ===
- 1 July – The Welsh Conservatives have called for the Welsh Government to announce plans to end COVID restrictions in Wales and to stop "treating the Welsh people like children".
- 2 July – Calls are made for volunteers who took part in trials of the Novavax vaccine to be given a second vaccine.
- 3 July –
  - Rugby union returns to Cardiff's Principality Stadium with a match between Wales and Canada. Spectators are advised that no food or drink is permitted at the venue.
  - Walk in vaccination centres are opened across Wales.
- 5 July –
  - A change to COVID regulations allows hospital boards the option of introducing COVID tests, thus permitting patients to have more visitors.
  - Figures released under a Freedom of Information request indicate that a quarter of deaths from COVID in Wales occurred after the person was infected in hospital.
  - As the UK government prepares to announce the final stage of its roadmap for lifting restrictions in Wales, Health Minister Eluned Morgan says Wales will have to "learn to live with" the virus.
- 8 July –
  - Figures from Public Health Wales indicate that COVID cases linked to schools have risen by a third in a week, making up almost a fifth of new cases.
  - Dr David Bailey, Chair of British Medical Association Wales has called for face masks to remain compulsory in a healthcare setting.
- 9 July ~
  - Dr Deidre Hine, The former chief medical officer for Wales, says that it is difficult to see how Wales cannot set a freedom day for lifting Covid restrictions now that England and Scotland have done so.
- Dr Gill Richardson, Myles is deputy chief medical officer, urges family and friends of those aged under 30 to get vaccinated.
  - The Welsh government announces that the wearing of facemasks will no longer be mandatory in schools from September.
  - The Welsh government says that people in Wales should continue to use the NHS COVID-19 app, even if social distancing rules differ from those in England.
- 10 July – As England prepared to change the quarantine rules for fully vaccinated people arriving from certain countries, representatives of the travel sector in Wales urge the Welsh government to change their own rules to bring them into line with England.
- 11 July-
  - The Welsh government says that the wearing of facemasks will continue to be required by law in some settings, even after changes to restrictions on 19 July that will see the relaxation of rules for the wearing of face masks and social distancing.
  - Dr John Watkins, a leading expert on infectious diseases, says that it is time for Wales to lift Covid restrictions.
- 13 July –
  - Ahead of the planned review of Covid restrictions the following day, First Minister Mark Drakeford says there will not be a wholesale scrapping of rules.
  - Passengers on Transport for Wales trains travelling to England will be asked to continue wearing their face coverings once across the border, even though they will not be compulsory in England after 19 July.
- 14 July –
  - The Welsh Government announces that most COVID restrictions will be lifted on 7 August. The rules regarding the numbers of people allowed to meet up indoors and outdoors will be scrapped, but face coverings will still be required in most indoor settings, including pubs, restaurants and schools.
  - As the Welsh Government its plans to lift most restrictions in August, they also announce their hope that full capacity crowds may be able to return to stadiums in time for the start of the football season in August
- 16 July –
  - First Minister Mark Drakeford says that people travelling from England into Wales by train will be asked to wear a face covering.
  - Mind Cymru calls for urgent action to ensure mental health services do not suffer post-COVID.
  - The TUC has argued Welsh workers are being put at risk because of a lack of capacity to enforce COVID assessments.
- 16 July – The Green Man Festival, one of the largest in Wales, is given the go-ahead to be staged from 19 to 22 August. But the Ironman Wales triathlon scheduled for 12 September is cancelled for a second year because of COVID.
- 17 July – COVID rules are relaxed to allow up to six people to meet up in an indoor private setting, while the number of people allowed to meet up outdoors increases. Indoor organised events involving up to 1,200 people are also permitted, with 1,000 seated and 200 standing.
- 18 July – It is reported the Welsh Government is considering whether to change self-isolation rules for those aged under 18 so that they would not need to self-isolate if they came into close contact with someone testing positive for COVID.
- 21 July –
  - The Welsh Government announces that NHS workers in Wales will get a 3% payrise.
  - Health Minister Eluned Morgan says the delivery of urgent care will be "transformed" to help the health service in Wales during an "exceptionally challenging period".
- 22 July – As figures show that 11,417 people were "pinged" by the NHS COVID-19 app in the week of 8–15 July, the Welsh Government reiterates its intention to end the requirement for fully vaccinated people to self-isolate if they come into close contact with someone testing positive for COVID from some time during August.
- 23 July – The National Union of Students Wales highlights the situation of overseas students from red list countries who will be required to pay £1,750 to quarantine in a hotel upon their arrival in Wales, something they describe as "unacceptable". Some universities have offered to pay the quarantine fees, and the Welsh Government has urged anyone affected by the situation to ask for assistance from their university.
- 24 July – Several hundred anti-lockdown protestors gather outside the Cardiff home of First Minister Mark Drakeford. The rally is subsequently condemned from across the political parties in Wales.
- 26 July – The number of fully vaccinated people in Wales passes two million.
- 27 July –
  - South Wales Police have said that "at no point" was First Minister Mark Drakeford at risk from demonstrators who gathered outside his home over the preceding weekend.
  - Chief Medical Officer Dr Frank Atherton says that based on current evidence he does not believe he will need to ask clinically vulnerable people to shield again.
- 29 July –
  - The Welsh Government announces that fully vaccinated people who are close contacts of someone testing positive for COVID will no longer be required to self-isolate from Saturday 7 August. Under 18s will also be exempt.
  - The number of daily COVID cases for Wales falls for an eighth consecutive day.
- 30 July – Unions have warned that changes to the furlough scheme due to come in on 1 August could put businesses still recovering from the COVID crisis at risk. From that date they will be required to pay more towards their employees' wages. The latest figures have shown that some 70,000 people in Wales are still on the Coronavirus Job Retention Scheme.

=== August 2021 ===
- 1 August – Organisers of the National Eisteddfod express hope that the Welsh language cultural festival will be able to take place in person in 2022, the 2020 and 2021 events having been held remotely.
- 2 August – Cardiff's Ice Arena Wales, one of two ice rinks in Wales, reopens following the lifting of restrictions. Although ice rinks were given the go-ahead to reopen on 17 July, work on the venue has meant it could not reopen immediately. Wales's other ice rink, at Deeside Leisure Centre, remains closed as it is being used as a COVID vaccination centre.
- 5 August –
  - The Welsh Government confirms that the majority of Wales's COVID restrictions will be lifted on Saturday 7 August. This will mean an end to rules on the numbers of people who can meet indoors, the reopening of nightclubs, and social distancing laws for workplaces will end. But the wearing of masks will remain compulsory.
  - Wales announces the adoption of travel international travel changes in line with those announced for England the previous day, and that will take effect from Sunday 8 August.
  - Health Minister Eluned Morgan suggests 16 and 17-year-olds may be offered COVID vaccines before the beginning of the autumn term.
- 7 August –
  - With some exceptions, such as compulsory mask wearing in certain settings, most remaining pandemic related restrictions conclude in Wales.
  - Grants for people on low pay and living in Wales who are asked to self-isolate rise from £500 to £750.
- 11 August – On the eve of the publication of GCSE results for England, Wales and Northern Ireland, David Jones, the chief executive of Qualifications Wales, says that exams "definitely have their place" in assessing pupils in future.
- 13 August – A BBC News report highlights issues with overcrowded trains with some people refusing to wear face masks, which are still mandatory in Wales.
- 15 August – The latest figures show that 67% of adults in Wales have been fully vaccinated, but that around 120,000 adults aged 18–29 are yet to receive their first COVID vaccine.
- 16 August – Lynn Gornall, organiser of Brecon Jazz Festival, which is taking place throughout August, defends the decision to hold a scaled-back event for 2021 following criticism, attributing the decision to the festival's public location and people's desire to not have something so big because of COVID.
- 17 August – Office for National Statistics figures show 22 COVID deaths in the week ending 6 August, a rise of nine on the previous week.
- 18 August – Health Minister Eluned Morgan announces £551m of extra funding for health and social care in Wales to help with the post-COVID recovery and tackle the waiting list backlog.
- 19 August –
  - More than 50 positive COVID cases are linked to a Year Eleven graduation party at a Monmouthshire hotel, where the manager believed the attendees had passed a lateral flow test.
  - Anna-Louise Rees-Marsh, of Covid Bereaved Families for Justice Cymru, calls for a public inquiry into the Welsh Government's handling of the pandemic, one separate from that planned by the UK government.
  - The Driver and Vehicle Licensing Agency (DVLA) has apologised for a ten-week delay experienced by motorists wishing to renew their driving licenses which has been caused by industrial action over COVID safety at the agency.
  - Figures have shown that hospital waiting lists in Wales have continued to grow, with 624,909 people waiting for treatment at the end of June.
- 20 August –
  - A total of 56 COVID cases in the Swansea Bay health board area are linked to the Boardmasters Festival held in Cornwall from 11 to 15 August, which was attended by 50,000 people.
  - Cardiff City manager Mick McCarthy says he will not force players to have the COVID-19 vaccination, even though the club has suffered a number of COVID cases during the summer.
- 23 August – Figures released by the Office for National Statistics indicate COVID was the 22nd most common cause of death in Wales during July.
- 24 August –
  - Conservative MP David TC Davies calls for an investigation into the Welsh Government's insistence that travellers needing a PCR test use a single and costly NHS provider, contrasting the situation with England where multiple providers are available, allowing people to find the best value tests.
  - Figures show the number of COVID hospitalisations in Wales has increased by 47% over the course of a week, with 195 people in hospital on 23 August.
- 25 August – The Welsh Government issues guidelines for the return of schools in September, which include twice-weekly lateral flow tests for secondary pupils, who must also take two tests three days apart in the week prior to returning to school. Primary school teachers must also take regular tests.
- 26 August –
  - First Minister Mark Drakeford confirms there will be no significant changes in Wales's latest review of COVID restrictions.
  - Figures from Public Health Wales show that COVID cases in Wales are at their highest since January, with the case rate at 334.1 per 100,000, but hospitalisations and deaths remain low.
- 27 August –
  - Eithne Hughes, director of the ASCL Cymru teaching union, criticises the Welsh Government's COVID guidelines for schools as "flabby", "vague in the extreme", and something that would be difficult to interpret.
  - COVID outbreaks are reported at two hospitals in North Wales – Ysbyty Gwynedd in Bangor, and Ysbyty Eryri in Caernarfon, Gwynedd.
- 28 August – The British Dental Association has urged the Welsh Government to change the rules for dental practices to allow more patients to have check-ups amid concerns the current situation could lead to tooth loss among patients.
- 29 August – Figures released by Public Health Wales for 27 August indicate 2,357 new COVID cases were recorded for that day, the highest number for Wales since 5 January, 2,383 cases were recorded. There were also three deaths on 27 August, compared to 40 on 5 January.
- 30 August – The Welsh Government announces a £6million technology fund aimed at stopping the spread of COVID-19 in schools, colleges and universities, which will seem them pay for 30,000 carbon dioxide sensors and 1,800 ozone disinfecting machines developed by Swansea University.
- 31 August –
  - Dr Ami Jones, a senior critical care consultant, says misinformation about the COVID vaccine has led to an increase in the number of young unvaccinated people in hospital with the illness.
  - Comedian Jimmy Carr gives a performance to the first full capacity indoor audience since March 2020 at Cardiff's St David's Hall.

=== September 2021 ===
- 1 September –
  - Figures from the Office for National Statistics show the number of COVID-related deaths in Wales have passed 8,000, with the latest weekly figures showing 18 deaths which took the total to 8,002.
  - With the Welsh Government having announced plans to buy ozone machines from Swansea University, it now transpires that it has not made a decision on the devices, and is awaiting expert advice.
- 2 September –
  - Figures released for the Test, Trace, Protect contact-tracing system show that less than half of those who test positive for COVID are reached within 24 hours.
  - Kelechi Nnoaham, director of public health at Cwm Taf Morgannwg health board, warns the NHS in Wales could face a "very difficult autumn and winter" if COVID cases continue to rise.
  - A diary of life at a care home during COVID kept by 94-year-old resident Bob Skinner is published.
- 3 September –
  - Figures from the Office for National Statistics indicate that COVID infections in Scotland are at their highest since records began of infections, with one in 75 estimated to have the virus at the end of the previous week, up from one in 140 in the week before.
  - A security glitch that allows people to edit COVID vaccine certificates first identified three months ago remains to be fixed, it is reported.
- 4 September – Public Health Wales believes 71 COVID cases are linked to the Green Man Festival that took place in August in the Brecon Beacons, and which was attended by 25,000 people.
- 5 September – Streets in New Quay, Aberaeron, Aberystwyth, and Cardigan that were closed to traffic by Ceredigion County Council in July 2020 to give pedestrians more space during the pandemic have reopened.
- 6 September – Dr Richard Stanton, a virologist at Cardiff University, has called for all teenagers to be given a COVID vaccine in order to prevent the dangers of them developing Long COVID.
- 7 September – The UK government announces a new Health and Social Care Tax to address the NHS patient backlog and shortfalls in social care; Wales will receive an extra £700m a year as a result of the tax.
- 9 September –
  - The Welsh Government gives travellers the go-ahead to use private COVID tests if they are unable to get government approved ones.
  - Cwm Taf Morgannwg health board bans hospital visitors due to a rise in COVID cases in the area.
  - Health Minister Eluned Morgan announces a Welsh Government investigation after two members of care staff at a dementia home in Holyhead were allowed to work after testing positive for COVID.
- 10 September – Betsi Cadwaladr health board cancels some surgical procedures due to a rise in COVID cases in hospitals in the area.
- 11 September – The Welsh Government confirms that people travelling abroad from Wales can use a wider selection of COVID tests from 21 September.
- 13 September – Bus company First Cymru suspends fifteen of its routes in Swansea and Neath Port Talbot due to a driver shortage caused by the DVLA backlog that has meant a delay to licence renewals for drivers.
- 14 September – Swansea Bay Health Board calls for secondary schools to reintroduce some COVID measures following the rise in COVID cases in the area, with pupils encouraged to take twice weekly lateral flow tests, the return of one way systems and the wearing of face coverings in school transport and in schools.
- 15 September –
  - Wales's COVID case rate falls for a fourth successive day, and stands at 500.1 per 100,000.
  - Owners of care homes have highlighted the difficulty in obtaining insurance against COVID, which threatens their closure.
- 17 September – The Welsh Government announces the introduction of vaccine passports for nightclubs and large scale events in Wales from 11 October.
- 18 September –
  - Professor Hugh Pennington, who chaired the 2005 inquiry into that year's E.coli outbreak in South Wales, has suggested a separate COVID inquiry for Wales would create "an enormous degree of overlap" and that he prefers a UK-wide inquiry that could give "detailed attention" to events in Wales.
  - Anne Webb, an 85-year-old nursing home resident from Treorchy, is believed to be the UK's first nursing home resident to receive a third COVID vaccine.
- 20 September –
  - The Welsh Ambulance Service becomes the latest UK ambulance service to ask for help from the military due to increased pressure because of COVID.
  - Welsh Labour has called off its party conference, scheduled for 5–7 November, due to concerns about rising COVID cases.
- 21 September – Figures from the Office for National Statistics indicate there were 65 COVID-related deaths in Wales in the week ending 10 September, the highest number of COVID-related deaths for six months.
- 22 September –
  - The patient watchdog the Community Health Council warns that people in some parts of Wales are facing a "crisis of access" to GPs, with some waiting as long as an hour on the phone to speak to their local surgery.
  - Health Minister Eluned Morgan says the Welsh Ambulance Service is facing pressure like never before.
- 23 September –
  - Wales once again produces the worst performance figures for hospital emergency department waiting times, with only 40.7% of patients attending A&E at one hospital being seen within four hours.
  - Students are urged that it would be "sensible" to get vaccinated as pop-up vaccination centres are established at universities for freshers week.
- 24 September –
  - Figures produced by Public Health Wales indicate a third of COVID cases over the last week were among people who are unvaccinated.
  - A Freedom of Information request reveals the Welsh Government spent £32,000 on an advertising campaign featuring rappers Goldie Lookin' Chain aimed at encouraging people to get vaccinated. This includes paying the band to write the song "Get the Jab Done". The Welsh Government also had a final say on the lyrics.
- 25 September –
  - Denbighshire becomes the latest Welsh local authority to ask its schools to strengthen COVID measures, including mask wearing and social distancing, as COVID cases rise.
  - The two-day Porthcawl Elvis Festival returns following its cancellation in 2020 due to COVID.
- 26 September –
  - Darren Hughes, director of the Welsh NHS Confederation, warns it could take several years to clear the patient backlog built up during COVID.
  - Health figures indicate the COVID case rate continues to rise in Wales, with the seven day average at 593.9 per 100,000, a rise from 582 two days earlier.
- 27 September – The Welsh Government agrees to partially align its COVID travel rules with England from 4 October by merging the green and amber lists and scrapping the pre-departure tests, but remains undecided on whether to change the rules regarding PCR tests after arrival.
- 28 September –
  - The Welsh Government confirms 5 October as the start date for its COVID pass scheme for large events, and announces that it will be a criminal offence to fake a lateral flow test for a COVID pass.
  - Hospital admission figures show COVID admissions to be at their lowest since 22 August.
- 29 September – Dr David Tuthill, officer for Wales for the Royal College of Paediatricians, calls for an end to the testing of children with no COVID symptoms as it places "huge strain" on schools.

=== October 2021 ===
- 1 October –
  - Dyfed-Powys Police and Crime Commissioner Dafydd Llywelyn says tracking down people with fake COVID passes should not be a priority for police officers.
  - Figures indicate there have been more than 10,000 COVID cases in Welsh schools since the beginning of the autumn term.
- 3 October –
  - The COVID case rate is estimated to be 612 per 100,000, but has fallen for the fourth successive day, and is down from 638.4 two days ago.
  - Health Minister Eluned Morgan confirms that all children aged 12–15 will have been offered a COVID vaccine by the end of the October half term.
- 4 October – Shelter Cymru has accused police forces in Wales of "assisting illegal evictions" during the pandemic. Evictions were banned in Wales for much of the pandemic, and remained so until June 2021 when the ban was replaced with a six-month notice for tenants.
- 5 October –
  - Members of the Senedd vote 28–27 in favour of introducing COVID passports for nightclubs and large events on 11 October.
  - The Royal College of GPs urges the Welsh Government to fund an alternative way of booking GP appointments to end what they describe as the competition of trying to get an appointment by phone.
- 6 October –
  - The Night Time Industries Association calls for the Senedd vote on COVID passports to be taken again after it emerges that one of the MSs was unable to log into Zoom to cast his virtual vote.
  - Data from Public Health Wales shows that case rates of COVID have fallen considerably in the under 25s over the preceding week.
- 7 October – As COVID case rates fall below 500 per 100,000 for the first time since mid-September, the Welsh Government releases a statement on its plans for the coming winter. It believes shops will be allowed to stay open as COVID moves from a pandemic to a seasonal illness. Two states of COVID Stable and COVID Urgent will also be used for determining the situation.
- 8 October –
  - Setting out the Welsh Government's autumn and winter plan, First Minister Mark Drakeford says that people can look forward to a Christmas "much more like the ones we are used to" providing nothing unexpected happens.
  - Aneurin Bevan health board, which is struggling to cope because of COVID, suspends its midwifery services at four hospitals and redirects expectant mothers to Cwmbran's Grange Hospital.
- 10 October –
  - After an excess of 10,000 COVID infections were reported in schools in Wales during September, the NAHT Cymru teaching union describes the new system for dealing with COVID in schools as having failed.
  - First Minister Mark Drakeford says it is "not acceptable" for anti-vaxers to intimidate people outside vaccination centres following an incident the previous day.
- 12 October – Health Minister Eluned Morgan apologises for mistakes made by the Welsh Government during their response to the early stages of the pandemic.
- 13 October – Dr Andrew Goodall, chief executive of NHS Wales, says the health service in Wales is facing its "most challenging period" of the pandemic as the ongoing presence of COVID continues to impact on its ability to deal with the backlog of patients.
- 17 October –
  - An independent adjudicator upholds a complaint by 13 University of Wales Trinity St David students after the university incorrectly claimed course changes were as a result of the COVID-19 pandemic, and recommends student fees are repaid.
  - The South Wales derby between Swansea and Cardiff City takes place, and is the first to be attended by spectators since January 2020.
- 19 October – The latest weekly COVID figures from the Office for National Statistics show 81 deaths in Wales, a rise of 17 on the previous week, but deaths are much lower than in the first and second waves. Hospital admissions are also shown to have increased, but are also lower than in previous peaks.
- 20 October – Dr Andrew Goodall, chief executive of NHS Wales, says the NHS in Wales is under the most intense pressure in its history as it prepares for winter.
- 21 October –
  - Statistics show the NHS in Wales has recorded its worst ever performance figures, with a tenfold increase in the number of people waiting more than nine months for treatment; around 25,000 people were waiting for treatment before the pandemic compared to the latest figures which show 250,000 are waiting.
  - As England prepares to change the rules surrounding PCR tests to allow fully vaccinated travellers returning from abroad to take a lateral flow test instead, the Welsh Conservatives call for clarity from the Welsh Government as to whether they intend to keep or change their own rules.
- 22 October –
  - Dr Roland Salmon, former director of communicable diseases for Public Health Wales, says he believes lockdown restrictions are only "at best marginally" beneficial for stopping the spread of COVID, and should not return over the coming winter to protect NHS Wales. Instead he says that efforts should be focused on vaccinating those most at risk.
  - Health Minister Eluned Morgan confirms fully vaccinated travellers returning to Wales from overseas will no longer need to take a PCR test from 31 October, bringing Wales in line with rule changes in England. Instead they will need a lateral flow test within two days of their return.
- 25 October – Wales's chief medical officer, Dr Frank Atherton, expresses his concern about people behaving as though the pandemic is over by not wearing face coverings and ignoring social distancing rules.
- 26 October – Data published by Public Health Wales indicates COVID cases have continued to increase and hit a new high of 719.9 cases per 100,000 over the past seven days.
- 29 October – First Minister Mark Drakeford announces new measures to tackle COVID in Wales, which has the highest rates. The COVID pass scheme will be extended to cinemas, theatres and concert halls from 15 November, while anyone living with a person who tests positive for COVID will be required to self-isolate until they can obtain a negative PCR test. Drakeford says that further measures will be considered if cases remain high.
- 30 October –
  - Wales hosts its first international rugby match with a full capacity crowd since the beginning of the pandemic. The game against New Zealand at Cardiff's Principality Stadium is attended by 74,000 spectators, the majority of who are required to present COVID passes before entering the stadium. Their tickets also include specified arrival times and entrances in order to stagger entries.
  - A display of 6,000 handmade angels have gone on show at St Giles' Parish Church in Wrexham to remember those who have died from COVID in Wales, and will remain in place until January 2022.
- 31 October – Cardiff's Castle Street reopens to traffic for the first time since July 2020, when it was closed to become an al-fresco dining area during the pandemic.

=== November 2021 ===
- 2 November – Rugby fans are asked to wear face coverings inside the Principality Stadium for Wales's forthcoming match against South Africa on 6 November. Simon Williams, an academic from Swansea University subsequently describes the measures as "not effective", as they apply to the stadium concourse and not to individual seats.
- 3 November – Spencer Birns, chief executive of Cardiff Airport, tells a Senedd committee passenger levels dropped to those of the 1950s during the pandemic, falling from 1.6m to 48,000.
- 9 November –
  - The Senedd votes 39–15 to extend Wales's COVID pass scheme from Monday 15 November to include cinemas, theatres and concert halls.
  - Research by the BBC finds that after regular testing was introduced for frontline hospital staff in December 2020, it took up to three months for healthcare workers at some hospitals to be tested.
- 10 November – Careers Wales teams up with Speakers for Schools to offer work experience to every state school in Wales "to help disadvantaged young people catch up post-Covid"; many school pupils missed out on work experience during the pandemic.
- 15 November – COVID pass requirements in Wales are extended to cinemas, theatres and concert venues.
- 16 November –
  - Transport for Wales says "lessons have been learnt" following complaints about overcrowded trains after an international football match between Wales and Belarus during the previous weekend. Many people had complained about feeling unsafe because a number of people were not wearing face coverings.
  - A Swansea cinema becomes the first in Wales to refuse to implement the COVID pass scheme, with its manager describing it as an "infringement of our human rights", "nonsensical" and "unnecessary".
- 17 November – First Minister Mark Drakeford confirms there will be no changes to COVID rules in the latest three-week review. Wales remains at alert level zero, but may introduce COVID passes for pubs and restaurants to keep them open over Christmas.
- 19 November – Anna Redfern, owner of Swansea-based Cinema & Co, confirms Swansea Council has ordered her to close the establishment because she declined to carry out COVID pass checks.
- 22 November – All secondary school pupils in Gwynedd are required to wear face coverings in school following a rise in COVID cases in the county.
- 24 November – Swansea Council announces plans to take Swansea-based Cinema & Co to court after it remained open following an order to close over its refusal to check customers for their COVID status.
- 25 November – Cinema & Co owner Anna Redfern fails to attend Swansea Magistrates' Court for the case brought against her by Swansea Council for refusing to implement COVID pass checks at her premises.
- 26 November – The Welsh Government orders the immediate closure of Cinema & Co.
- 27 November – Wales reintroduces the requirement for all travellers arriving from abroad to take a PCR test following the discovery of two cases of the Omicron COVID variant in the UK.
- 28 November – Cardiff Rugby Club's plans to fly out to South Africa for a match are cancelled after two of their team test positive for COVID.
- 29 November –
  - First Minister Mark Drakeford announces changes to COVID rules for secondary schools, requiring pupils to wear face coverings in classrooms. The changes go further than England, where they are only required in communal areas.
  - Drakeford also urges people to "think carefully" about meeting vulnerable relatives over Christmas.
- 30 November –
  - Prime Minister Boris Johnson tells First Minister Mark Drakeford that whoever leads a UK-wide COVID inquiry will want the investigation to be "visible and properly accessible to the people of Wales".
  - At a court hearing in Swansea, Anna Redfern, owner of Cinema & Co is ordered to close the business by a district judge for refusing to implement COVID passport checks. She is also fined £5,265 in costs.
  - Health Minister Eluned Morgan becomes the latest senior politician in Wales to urge people to exercise caution when socialising over Christmas.

=== December 2021 ===
- 1 December –
  - Swansea's Cinema & Co reopens a day after being ordered to close by a district judge following its owners refusal to implement COVID pass regulations.
  - Leading dentist Dr Russell Gidney warns Wales may never catch up with the backlog of missed dental appointments caused by the pandemic, saying that none of his 6,000 patients have had a routine check-up in the past year.
- 2 December – The Welsh tourism sector fears another raft of restrictions over Christmas following the onset of the Omicron COVID variant.
- 3 December –
  - Swansea Council is looking into whether Cinema & Co may have to pay back some of the £53,000 it received in COVID grants.
  - The first case of Omicron variant COVID is identified in Wales.
- 4 December – First Minister Mark Drakeford says that a decision on whether to extend the COVID pass scheme to pubs and restaurants will be made at the "last minute".
- 5 December – Transport for Wales has said its trains are "fundamentally safe" following complaints of overcrowding during the pandemic.
- 6 December – Health Minister Eluned Morgan announces that all adults in Wales will be offered a booster vaccination by the end of January, with plans to open more vaccination centres to facilitate this.
- 7 December – First Minister Mark Drakeford says that Wales stands on the brink of "another potentially perilous moment" ahead of an expected "formidable wave" of Omicron cases, which are expected to peak in January.
- 9 December –
  - Fourteen schools in Wales are to trial longer school days, with an extra hour added each day, as a way of helping pupils to catch up with missed work.
  - The Welsh Government urges everyone to take a lateral flow test before going out to places like the shops, the pub or to see others.
- 10 December –
  - First Minister Mark Drakeford announces COVID rules will be reviewed on a weekly basis in response to the emergence of the Omicron variant.
  - Swansea Council confirms it has bolted down the shutters to Cinema & Co and plans to initiate contempt of court proceedings against its owner, Anna Redfern.
- 11 December – NHS bosses in Cardiff have said they would discourage people from attending Christmas parties in order to relieve pressure on the NHS.
- 12 December – Health Minister Eluned Morgan warns fresh restrictions are likely "in the next few weeks".
- 13 December –
  - First Minister Mark Drakeford confirms that all adults over the age of 18 in Wales will be offered their booster vaccine by the end of the year.
  - School pupils in Anglesey and Denbighshire will move to remote learning from the coming weekend, it is confirmed.
- 14 December –
  - A difference emerges between vaccinations in England and Wales, with Wales choosing not to operate vaccination centres, but instead to contact people individually.
  - Health Minister Eluned Morgan says she does not want to "cancel" Christmas, but that tougher measures cannot be ruled out over the festive period.
  - Anna Redfern, owner of Swansea-based Cinema & Co is given a suspended 26-day prison sentence and fined £15,000 for contempt of court by the city's Magistrates following her refusal to implement COVID pass checks at her premises.
- 15 December – Data obtained by BBC News suggests 600 children and teenagers were admitted to hospital in Wales with COVID in 2021.
- 16 December –
  - First Minister Mark Drakeford announces the closure of nightclubs in Wales from 27 December as a result of the spread of the Omicron variant.
  - Education Minister Jeremy Miles confirms that schools will restart two days later in January to give them time to plan for the return of pupils to the classroom or switch to remote learning.
- 17 December – BBC News reports on the plight of gym owners, many of whom fear losing their livelihoods with further restrictions.
- 18 December – Dr Giri Shankar of Public Health Wales suggests further restrictions could be needed to curb the "tsunami" of Omicron variant cases.
- 19 December – First Minister Mark Drakeford rejects criticism that he is "gambling" with the livelihoods of nightclub owners with plans to close nightclubs again from 27 December.
- 20 December –
  - Non-urgent operations, procedures and outpatient appointments are being postponed in north Wales so the NHS can focus on giving COVID vaccines.
  - A further 163 Omicron cases are recorded in Wales, taking the total to 435.
- 21 December – The Welsh Government announces the levy of fines on employees and employers if people are not remote working without a good reason, effective from Monday 27 December. Workers will receive a £60 fixed penalty fine while employers will receive a £1,000 fine for each breach of the rules.
- 23 December – The Welsh Government confirms that people in Wales who test positive for COVID will still need to self-isolate for ten days, and that it will not be following rule changes brought in for England that saw the period reduced to seven days.
- In his Christmas message, Andrew John, the Archbishop of Wales, thanks NHS staff for showing "selfless love" during the pandemic.
- 26 December –
  - With Wales facing renewed COVID restrictions, the Welsh Retail Consortium urges the Welsh Government to give everyone in Wales £100 vouchers to spend in local shops as a way of helping the economy, similar to a scheme that was implemented in Northern Ireland.
  - Wales moves to COVID Alert Level 2, where restrictions on the number of people at social gatherings and two metre social distancing return.
- 27 December – BBC News reports that new COVID restrictions for hospitality sector businesses have left people confused, while others are staying away.
- 28 December – Welsh hospitality businesses fear losing New Year custom to venues across the border in England because of tighter COVID rules in Wales, BBC News reports.
- 29 December –
  - Deputy Chief Medical Officer Dr Chris Jones says the Omicron variant is now the dominant COVID variant in Wales, with an additional 12,000 cases reported over the Christmas holidays.
  - Health Secretary Sajid Javid criticises the Welsh Government's decision to ban outdoor mass exercise as disproportionate and unjustified after Parkrun events were cancelled in Wales.
- 30 December –
  - Wales moves forward by several days its plans to cut the self-isolation period of anyone testing positive for COVID from ten to seven days. A negative test will be required before the self-isolation period can be ended, with the changes coming into effect from New Year's Eve rather than 5 January 2022 as originally planned.
  - The Welsh Government announces that Wales will lend England four million lateral flow tests to help with the current shortage of tests being experienced by England.

== See also ==
- Timeline of the COVID-19 pandemic in Wales (2020)
- Timeline of the COVID-19 pandemic in Wales (2022)
- Timeline of the COVID-19 pandemic in the United Kingdom (January–June 2021)
- Timeline of the COVID-19 pandemic in the United Kingdom (July–December 2021)
- Timeline of the COVID-19 pandemic in England (2021)
- Timeline of the COVID-19 pandemic in Scotland (2021)
- Timeline of the COVID-19 pandemic in Northern Ireland (2021)
- History of the COVID-19 pandemic in the United Kingdom
