= Timeline of the COVID-19 pandemic in Wales =

Timeline of the COVID-19 pandemic in Wales may refer to:

- Timeline of the COVID-19 pandemic in Wales (2020)
- Timeline of the COVID-19 pandemic in Wales (2021)
- Timeline of the COVID-19 pandemic in Wales (2022)
