= Keith Neal =

Keith Neal is emeritus professor in the epidemiology of infectious diseases at the University of Nottingham.

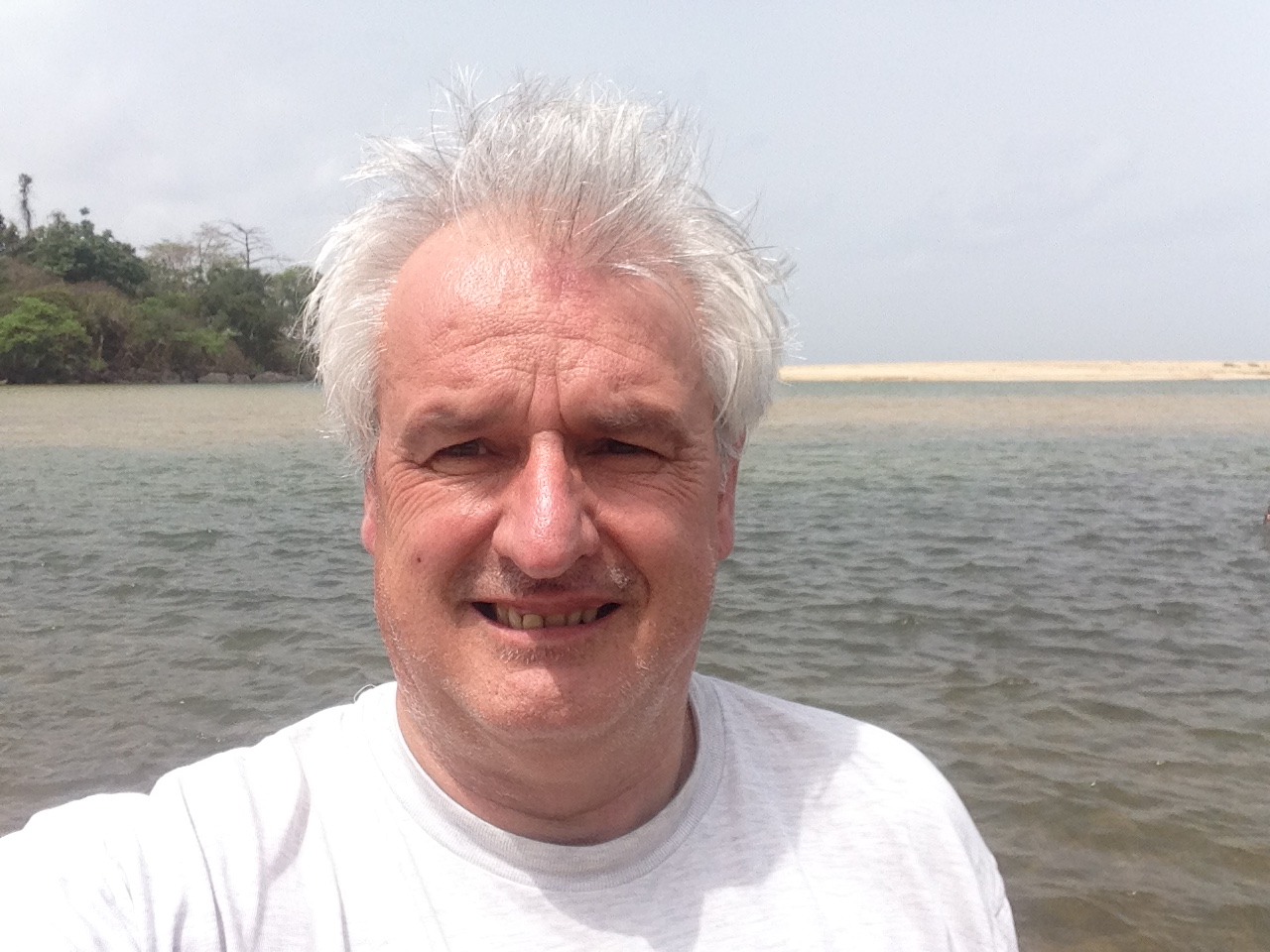
Keith Neal in Sierra Leonne 2014

== Career ==
Neal trained in infectious diseases and public health. He afterwards worked as a senior lecturer, then professor, in the epidemiology of infectious diseases and as a consultant for the UK public health services (Health authorities, Health Protection Agency, Public Health England United Kingdom Health Security Agency and Public Health Wales). His research interests included hepatitis C, meningococcal disease, food poisoning risks and sequelae, particularly campylobacter, and making surgery safer especially using antibiotics to manage appendicitis. He was involved in major vaccine trials for HPV and meningitis. His public health work included outbreak investigation and management, vaccine and travel advice, assessing clinical services and delivering epidemiological services to a region (5-8 million people). He represented his colleagues on the national infected health care workers advisory panel, hepatitis, meningitis and food poisoning national groups. He has also worked on the public health response to Ebola outbreaks, including visits to Sierra Leone. He went back to work for Public Health England, the UK Health Security Agency and Public Health Wales as a consultant to support the COVID-19 response from 2020 to 2025. Keith Neal is now an honary clinical professor at the North Wales Medical School and working with NHS resolution legal teams on Covid claims.
