= Timeline of the COVID-19 pandemic in Wales (2020) =

2020 Welsh daily pandemic-related events

The following is a timeline of the COVID-19 pandemic in Wales during 2020. There are significant differences in the legislation and the reporting between the countries of the UK: England, Scotland, Northern Ireland, and Wales.

== Timeline ==
=== February 2020 ===
- 28 February – Authorities confirm the first case of coronavirus in Wales, an individual who recently returned from holiday in Italy.

=== March 2020 ===
- 11 March – Wales has its first case of "community transmission", when a patient in Caerphilly with no travel history tests positive for COVID-19.
- 12 March – A patient at Wrexham Maelor Hospital tests positive for COVID-19 – the first case in North Wales.
- 13 March – The Welsh Government's Health Minister Vaughan Gething announces that all non-urgent outpatient appointments and operations will be suspended at hospitals in Wales, in a bid to delay the spread of the coronavirus pandemic.
- 17 March – The National Assembly for Wales is closed to the public.
- 23 March – Mark Drakeford, the First Minister of Wales, was advised to impose the first stay at home lockdown. With the UK death toll hitting 335 deaths and 16 in Wales, Boris Johnson announced a nationwide 'Stay at Home' order would come into effect as of midnight and it would be reviewed every 3 weeks. This would become known as the UK lockdown.

=== April 2020 ===
- 1 April –
  - The National Assembly for Wales reconvenes using Zoom for a virtual emergency Senedd meeting.
  - Multinational pharmaceutical company Roche denies the existence of a deal to supply Wales with COVID-19 tests after First Minister Mark Drakeford and Health Minister Vaughan Gething blame the collapse of a deal for a shortage of testing kits.
- 8 April – Mark Drakeford, the First Minister of Wales, confirms the Welsh Government will extend the lockdown beyond the initial three-week period for Wales.
- 11 April – Occupancy of critical care beds in England peaks at around 58% of capacity. Occupancy in the month of April for Scotland and Wales will only briefly exceed 40%, while Northern Ireland reported a peak of 51% early in the month.
- 12 April – The temporary Dragon's Heart Hospital opens at Cardiff's Principality Stadium to admit its first patients.
- 17 April – Later analysis of death registrations (all causes) in England and Wales by the Office for National Statistics finds the highest total this week, which at 21,805 is 207% of the five-year average for the same week. COVID-19 is mentioned in 8,730 cases.
- 20 April – Prof Dame Angela Maclean, the UK's deputy chief scientific adviser, says the number of confirmed cases is "flattening out". The number of people in hospital for COVID-19 has begun to fall in Scotland, Wales and every region of England, with significant falls in London and the Midlands.
- 21 April – Figures released by the Office for National Statistics indicate deaths in England and Wales have reached a twenty year high, with 18,500 deaths from all causes in the week up to 10 April, about 8,000 more than the average for that time of year. The deaths include those in care homes, where the 1,043 year-to-date deaths related to COVID-19 is a jump from the 217 reported a week ago.
- 22 April – Doctors in Wales have written a joint letter to First Minister Mark Drakeford urging him to ban the use of second homes during the outbreak.
- 28 April –
  - Figures from the Office for National Statistics for the week ending 17 April show 22,351 deaths registered in England and Wales, nearly double the five-year average and the highest weekly total since comparable records began in 1993.
  - The ONS report indicates a third of coronavirus deaths in England and Wales are occurring in care homes, with 2,000 recorded in the week ending 17 April, and the number of deaths from all causes in care homes is almost three times the number recorded three weeks ago.

=== May 2020 ===
- 5 May – Figures from the Office for National Statistics for the week ending 24 April show 21,997 deaths from all causes registered in England and Wales; this is a decrease of 354 from the previous week but still nearly twice the five-year average for the time of year. Deaths per week in hospital are falling while those in care homes continue to increase, and for the year to 24 April, 5,890 deaths in care homes involved COVID-19.
- 8 May – Mark Drakeford, the First Minister of Wales, extends the lockdown restrictions for a further three weeks but with some minor changes. People are allowed to exercise outside more than once a day and councils can plan for the reopening of libraries and tips. Some garden centres can also reopen.
- 10 May – The UK government updates its coronavirus message from "stay at home, protect the NHS, save lives" to "stay alert, control the virus, save lives". The Opposition Labour Party expresses concern the slogan could be confusing, and leaders of the devolved governments in Scotland, Wales and Northern Ireland say they will keep the original slogan.
- 12 May – Figures released by the Office for National Statistics and the devolved administrations indicate the death toll from COVID-19 exceeds 40,000 – including almost 11,000 care home residents – although week-by-week numbers continue to fall. In care homes in England and Wales, the year-to-date COVID-19 total reaches 8,312 but the weekly number (to 1 May) shows a decrease for the first time since the start of the pandemic.
- 15 May –
  - A report on deaths in care homes in England and Wales from the Office for National Statistics finds 9,039 deaths between 2 March and 1 May, and a further 3,444 deaths of residents in hospital. In this period, COVID-19 was involved in 27% of all deaths of care home residents. Since the last week of March, non-COVID deaths have been higher than previous years; deaths of residents from all causes peaked around 14 April.
  - First Minister of Wales Mark Drakeford outlines a "traffic lights" route out of lockdown for Wales, which he describes as being "in the red zone", but does not give any dates for when the restrictions will be eased.
- 18 May – Jury trials resume at a handful of courts in England and Wales, having been suspended since the beginning of the lockdown restrictions.
- 29 May – *Mark Drakeford, the First Minister of Wales, announces an easing of the lockdown restrictions for Wales from Monday 1 June, that will allow the members of two households to meet up outdoors. Non-essential retailers are urged to use the next three weeks to "prepare safeguarding".
- 31 May – Welsh health minister Vaughan Gething announces an easing of lockdown rules for those shielding at home in Wales. From 1 June they may meet up outside with people from another household, but must maintain social distancing rules and must not go into another person's home.

=== June 2020 ===
- 3 June – Welsh education minister Kirsty Williams announces that all schools in Wales will reopen from 29 June. They will be open for all pupils, but only a third of students will be in school at any one time. The summer term is also extended by a week.
- 9 June – Welsh health minister Vaughan Gething announces that people in Wales will be asked to wear three-layer face covering in situations where social distancing is not possible, such as on public transport.
- 13 June – The 2020 Abergavenny Food Festival, Wales's largest food festival scheduled for September, is cancelled due to the COVID-19 epidemic.
- 18 June – Workers at a chicken processing plant in Llangefni, Anglesey are required to go into self-isolation following an outbreak of COVID-19 that has affected more than 100 people. The factory supplies hospitals, shops and restaurants.
- 19 June – The Welsh Government sets out its programme for easing lockdown restrictions, beginning on 22 June with measures that include allowing retailers to reopen and lifting restrictions on outdoor sports. Travel restrictions to, from and around Wales are to be lifted from 6 July.
- 21 June – The number of workers at an Anglesey chicken factory who have tested positive for COVID-19 rises to 158.
- 22 June –
  - After the UK Government updates its advice to people who are shielding in England, the Welsh Government issues a statement to say that shielding advice has not changed in Wales, where it is in place until 16 August.
  - The Welsh Government lifts its restrictions on wedding and civil partnership ceremonies, allowing them to take place again, but the ban on social gatherings remains.
  - The Welsh Government confirms that 1,097 hospital patients were discharged to care homes without a coronavirus test at the beginning of lockdown.
- 24 June – First Minister of Wales Mark Drakeford announces that the two-metre social distancing rule will stay in place in Wales, describing it as the "safe way to behave".
- 28 June – Opposition parties in Wales express their concern after figures indicate the turnaround speed of COVID-19 tests has slowed in the country. Around half of tests are coming back within 24 hours, a decrease on 68% at the end of April.
- 29 June –
  - The Welsh Government announces that two households in Wales can form what is termed an "extended household" from 6 July, enabling them to meet up indoors and stay overnight; the extended household measure also includes people who are shielding.
  - Schools reopen in Wales.
  - The families of workers at a meat processing plant in Merthyr Tydfil are told to self-isolate after 101 people associated with the factory tested positive for COVID-19.

=== July 2020 ===
- 2 July – The Welsh Government announces that pubs, bars, cafes and restaurants can open outdoors from 13 July.
- 3 July – First Minister of Wales Mark Drakeford announced the lifting of the five-mile "stay local" travel restrictions for Wales from 6 July. From this date outdoor attractions were permitted to reopen, and two households permitted to meet up indoors.
- 6 July –
  - No new deaths are reported for Wales for the most recent 24-hour period.
  - Wales lifts its "stay local" restrictions, meaning there are no limits on travel.
- 9 July – All state schools in Wales will reopen in September, Education Minister Kirsty Williams confirms. Schools will have limited social distancing for groups of pupils, but adults will have to maintain social distance regulations. Parents whose children do not attend school will not face fines. An extra 900 teaching posts are to be created in Wales to help pupils catch up on their studies.
- 10 July –
  - Figures released by the National Police Chiefs' Council show that no fines were issued in England and Wales for breach of quarantine rules during the first two weeks after their introduction, while ten people were fined for not wearing face coverings on public transport in the two weeks preceding 22 June.
  - For the second time in under a week no new deaths are reported for Wales in the most recent 24-hour period.
  - First Minister of Wales Mark Drakeford announces that pubs, cafes, restaurants and bars in Wales can reopen indoors from 3 August.
- 11 July – As some holiday homes reopen in Wales, First Minister Mark Drakeford says it is "absolutely safe" to visit the country again.
- 13 July –
  - Hairdressers and barbers reopen in Wales.
  - Wales has experienced two consecutive days without any new coronavirus deaths, and four in total since 6 July.
  - The First Minister of Wales announces that the wearing of face coverings will become compulsory on public transport in Wales from 27 July.
- 14 July –
  - Wales's Finance Minister Rebecca Evans announces that the threshold on Land Transaction Tax on property sales will be raised from £180,000 to £250,000 from 27 July until March 2021. It means the majority of property sales in Wales will be exempted from the tax during this period.
  - Wales's largest Accident and Emergency unit at University Hospital of Wales, Cardiff, tells non-emergency patients to call ahead before attending A&E; they will be assessed remotely and given an appointment time.
- 15 July –
  - As the number of positive tests for Wales drops to around 1%, the country's Health Minister, Vaughan Gething announces the implementation of a new "risk-based" testing strategy for Wales.
  - First Minister of Wales Mark Drakeford confirms to the Senedd that driving lessons can resume in Wales from 27 July.
- 16 July –
  - Wales's Chief Medical Officer, Dr Frank Atherton confirms the 130,000 people shielding in Wales will no longer need to do so from 16 August.
  - Wales reports another day without any new deaths, its fifth over the last ten days.
- 17 July – First Minister Mark Drakeford announces that the Wales daily briefings will end and instead take place on a weekly basis.
- 18 July – Wales reports no new COVID related deaths for the fourth time in seven days.
- 20 July – Playgrounds, outdoor gyms and funfairs are allowed to reopen under the latest easing of lockdown measures.
- 21 July –
  - Health Minister Vaughan Gething announces that doctors and dentists in Wales are to receive a 2.8% above-inflation pay rise.
  - Public Health Wales reports no new COVID-19 deaths for the most recent 24 hour period.
- 22 July –
  - Public Health Wales publishes details of how several hundred people have been infected with COVID-19 while in hospital, in what are termed nosocomial cases.
  - Welsh Rugby Union chief executive Martyn Phillips confirms no further international matches will be played at the Principality Stadium during 2020.
- 23 July –
  - The Welsh Government announces that pregnant women can take a partner to antenatal appointments.
  - The Welsh Government announces that no new free food boxes will be delivered to people shielding in Wales if a second lockdown period is required.
- 24 July –
  - Public Health Wales records its latest day without any new COVID deaths, meaning only one death from the virus has been recorded over the past week.
  - First Minister Mark Drakeford confirms that cinemas, museums and beauty salons can reopen from 27 July.
- 25 July – Campsites with shared facilities are allowed to reopen.
- 27 July –
  - Beauty salons, tattooists, nail bars, spas, tanning shops, museums and art galleries are permitted to reopen. Driving lessons can also resume.
  - The wearing of face coverings becomes mandatory on public transport in Wales.
  - The Welsh Government scraps a law requiring remote work where possible, meaning it is no longer a criminal offence to not do so, but people are still advised to work remotely if they have the option.
  - No new coronavirus deaths are recorded in Wales.
- 28 July – Staff and patients at hospitals in North Wales are being "actively" tested for COVID-19 following a spike of cases at Wrexham Maelor Hospital.
- 30 July – First Minister Mark Drakeford confirms pubs, restaurants and cafes can reopen for indoor customers from 3 August.
- 31 July – First Minister Mark Drakeford confirms swimming pools, gyms, leisure centres and indoor play areas, including soft play can reopen from 3 August. Children under 11 will no longer be required to stay two meters apart from each other or from adults from that date, and outdoor gatherings of up to 30 people will be allowed.

=== August 2020 ===
- 4 August –
  - Following testing conducted in Wrexham, Public Health Wales concludes there is "no evidence of widespread transmission" of COVID-19 in the area.
  - Following the previous day's reopening of hospitality businesses, International Relations Minister Eluned Morgan reminds pubs and restaurants to collect customer details and maintain social distancing, and warns those who fail to comply could be forced to close again.
- 5 August – Updated advice from the Welsh Government urges anyone with COVID-19 to seek medical help if their symptoms have not improved in seven days.
- 6 August –
  - The Welsh Government says it is working with authorities in Gwynedd to maintain safety after concerns are raised by opposition politicians that the area is being overwhelmed by tourists.
  - Wales becomes the first part of the UK to place quarantine restrictions on travellers arriving into the UK from Belgium, the Bahamas and Andorra, with the new rules coming into effect from midnight; they come into force at 4am on 8 August for the rest of the UK.
- 7 August – The Welsh exams watchdog, Qualifications Wales, says that thousands of estimated GCSE and A Level grades will be lowered to account for teachers being "generous" and inconsistency in different schools.
- 10 August –
  - Gyms, swimming pools and soft play areas reopen in Wales.
  - A Senedd inquiry has concluded that COVID-19 had a devastating impact on the poorest communities, highlighting the inequality in society.
- 11 August – Julie James, the Minister for Housing and Local Government, announces a £50m funding package to support housing projects in Wales and find permanent accommodation for the country's homeless.
- 12 August – More than a fifth of COVID-19 deaths in Wales were among dementia patients, figures have revealed, prompting calls for the establishment of a dementia task force ahead of a potential second wave of the virus.
- 13 August –
  - A Level results are published. In Wales 42% of grades are lower than estimated.
  - Public Health Wales reports another day without any COVID-19 deaths.
- 14 August – The Welsh Government postpones the easing of rules for meeting up indoors from 15 August to 22 August; from then four households can form an extended bubble and meet up indoors providing the conditions "remain stable". Up to 30 people may attend an indoor meal following a wedding or funeral from the same date. New powers are also announced requiring hospitality businesses to collect customers' details for contact tracing purposes from 17 August.
- 15 August – Education minister Kirsty Williams confirms that students with lower than predicted A Level results will be able to appeal the grades.
- 16 August – The shielding programme ends in Wales; it is the last part of the UK to end its shielding programme.
- 17 August –
  - The Welsh Government announces that A Level and GCSE results in Wales will be based on teachers' assessment following an uproar over grades.
  - Wales records another day with no COVID-19 deaths.
- 20 August – GCSE results are published, the grades now based on teachers' assessments. More than 25% are A* and A grades, compared to 18.4% in 2019.
- 21 August –
  - First Minister Mark Drakeford announces that small-scale outdoor theatres and sporting events involving audience of up to 100 will be trialled, with three events to initially take place.
  - As Public Health Wales confirms 14 new daily cases of COVID-19, the highest for 11 weeks, workers at a Sky call centre in Cardiff are self-isolating after a number of colleagues tested positive for the virus.
- 22 August –
  - Public Health Wales reports the first COVID-19 related death for six days.
  - Porthcawl's annual Elvis Presley Festival, scheduled for the end of September, is cancelled because of the COVID-19 pandemic.
- 24 August – Public Health Wales says that a reported rise in cases in Cardiff is due to increased socialising. A total of 47 have been reported over the preceding week, most of them among the 20–30 age group.
- 25 August – Research by the Welsh Government indicates that three quarters of tourism businesses have reopened since lockdown restrictions started to be lifted, but that at least half are not operating at full capacity.
- 26 August – The Welsh Government announces that it will be up to individual schools and local authorities to decide whether or not face coverings are mandatory for secondary school pupils.
- 28 August –
  - Figures from the Office for National Statistics show Wales has one of the lowest COVID mortality rates, with 75.7 deaths per 100,000, lower than every part of England apart from the south west.
  - Indoor visits to care homes are permitted, but the sector says guidelines have probably come too late for visits to resume over the approaching bank holiday weekend.
- 29 August – Wales records no further COVID deaths for the most recent 24 hour period, but 40 new cases are reported.
- 30 August –
  - Passengers on a flight from Zante to Cardiff on 25 August are told to self-isolate after a person on board subsequently tested positive for COVID-19.
  - South Wales Police say they have broken up an illegal rave at Banwen in the Brecon Beacons, involving 3,000 people from around the UK; the organisers are fined £10,000.
- 31 August –
  - Public Health Wales reports no new COVID-19 deaths, but 39 new cases.
  - The airline operator Tui launches an investigation after the number of passengers on a flight from Zante to Cardiff who subsequently tested positive for COVID-19 rises to sixteen, and amid claims safety measures were ignored on the flight.

=== September 2020 ===
- 1 September –
  - Education minister Kirsty Williams announces that talks will be held between the Welsh Government and Qualifications Wales regarding whether to delay school examinations in 2021.
  - Travellers arriving into Wales from Zante are asked to self-isolate for 14 days after 16 passengers on a flight from the Greek island tested positive for COVID-19.
- 3 September – Wales removes Portugal from its quarantine exemption list following a rise in COVID-19 cases in that country, with the new rules taking effect from 4am on 4 September. The Greek islands of Crete, Zakynthos, Mykonos, Lesvos, Paros and Antiparos, as well as Gibraltar and French Polynesia are also removed. It is the first time the Welsh Government has set different quarantine rules to the UK government.
- 5 September – Hefin David, Member of the Senedd for Caerphilly urges people in the area to increase their social distancing to avoid another lockdown, after 62 new cases of COVID-19 are reported in the preceding week.
- 6 September –
  - Lawyers express their concern about the delay in court cases in England and Wales, with some 9,000 having been delayed since the start of lockdown, and warn that measures put in place to speed up cases may not be effective.
  - A further 98 new COVID-19 cases are reported, including 25 in Caerphilly and 23 in Rhondda Cynon Taf.
- 7 September –
  - A further 133 COVID-19 cases are reported, the highest daily number in Wales since 30 June, with cases continuing to rise in Caerphilly and Rhondda Cynon Taf.
  - Residents of Caerphilly County Borough Council are made subject to the first local lockdown in Wales, which takes effect from 6pm on 8 September. Health Minister Vaughan Gething announces that mass testing has indicated community spread in the area, with the Minister blaming the rise on individuals socializing in homes. As a result of the new measures, those within Caerphilly Council will have to wear face coverings in indoor public spaces, extended household arrangements will be ended, and travel restrictions will be in place to prevent travel outside of Caerphilly without a "good reason".
- 8 September – As Caerphilly County Borough enters lockdown, council leaders in Rhondda Cynon Taf warn there are just days to avoid similar measures being introduced there.
- 9 September –
  - A hundred people are self-isolating after 14 COVID-19 cases are linked to a sports club awards evening in Carmarthenshire.
  - Carl Cuss, a Caarphilly County Borough Council cabinet member, resigns from his post after social media pictures appear showing him appearing to break social distancing rules.
- 10 September –
  - Hungary and the French island of Réunion are removed from the quarantine exemption list from 4am on 12 September, while Sweden is added to it meaning travellers from there will no longer be required to self-isolate.
  - Public Health Wales records a further 102 new cases of COVID-19.
  - Cwm Taf Morgannwg health board, covering the South Wales Valleys, reports a doubling of hospitalisations through COVID-19 in the preceding week, with 72 cases requiring hospital treatment.
  - People in Rhondda Cynon Taf and Merthyr Tydfil are asked to wear face coverings at work, in shops and crowded public spaces to avoid a Caerphilly-style lockdown.
- 11 September – The Welsh Government announces that the wearing of face coverings in shops and other indoor spaces will become compulsory from 14 September, and that indoor meetings of more than six people will be banned.
- 13 September –
  - A further 162 COVID-19 cases are confirmed in Wales.
  - The Welsh Government says that a third of people should still work remotely, even when COVID-19 restrictions have been lifted.
  - Sport Wales says that junior sport in Wales is "under major threat" over the coming winter, with the possibility of teams playing no matches due to the pandemic. There are also concerns that children may "drift away" from sports like rugby and football because they cannot play them in the same way as pre-COVID.
- 14 September –
  - Public Health Wales says that the details of 18,000 people who tested positive for COVID-19 were published online in error on 30 August. The information was available for 20 hours, and while full names were not published, the information may have made it possible to identify care home residents.
  - An August Bank Holiday weekend party is believed to be behind a spike of COVID-19 cases in Newport.
- 15 September –
  - An extra 5,000 hospital beds will be made available over the winter for potential COVID-19 patients.
  - Following reports of people being unable to get COVID-19 tests, or having to travel several hundred miles to a test centre, First Minister Mark Drakeford says that tests may become available for those without symptoms once new laboratory facilities are opened in November.
- 16 September –
  - Rhondda Cynon Taf is placed under lockdown restrictions, effective from 18:00 BST on 17 September. From then, people living in the area are not permitted to leave without a valid reason, such as travelling to work or for education, and licensed premises must close at 23:00 BST.
  - Public Health Wales reports 199 further COVID-19 cases in the most recent 24 hours, but no deaths for the past 15 days.
- 17 September –
  - Gibraltar and Thailand are added to the quarantine exemption list from 04:00 on 19 September, while travellers from Guadeloupe and Slovenia will be required to self-isolate is they arrive in Wales after then.
  - Dr Robin Howe of Public Health Wales warns that a spike in COVID-19 cases in locked down areas could lead to a rise in hospitalisations and deaths in those areas.
- 18 September –
  - First Minister Mark Drakeford says that Newport and Merthyr Tydfil are being kept under watch following a rise in COVID-19 cases in those areas.
  - Betsi Cadwaladr University Health Board declares that a COVID-19 outbreak in Wrexham is over.
- 19 September –
  - The number of daily COVID-19 cases rises to 212, with two deaths also reported.
  - Hospital and care home visits are suspended in Bridgend, Merthyr Tydfil and Rhondda Cynon Taf because of concerns about rising COVID-19 cases in those areas.
- 20 September –
  - A further 199 daily COVID-19 cases are reported for Wales, but no further deaths.
  - Eluned Morgan, the Welsh Government's Minister for International Relations, says that stricter enforcement may have to be considered if people continue to break COVID-19 rules.
- 21 September – Lockdown restrictions are announced for Merthyr Tydfil, Bridgend, Blaenau Gwent and Newport with effect from 18:00 on 22 September; people in those areas will not be permitted to leave, while licensed premises must close by 23:00.
- 22 September – In a pre-recorded television address, First Minister Mark Drakeford announces fresh restrictions amid rising COVID-19 cases, bringing Wales into line with England. Pubs, restaurants and bars must close at 10pm from Thursday 24 September, and offer table service only, while off licences and supermarkets must stop serving alcohol at that time. Drakeford also advises people against unnecessary travel.
- 23 September – First Minister Mark Drakeford says there is no case to extend lockdown measures to other areas of Wales, and that measures already announced need time to work.
- 24 September –
  - The second version of the NHS contact-tracing app is made available for download by the public in England and Wales.
  - Huw Thomas, leader of Cardiff City Council says that lockdown measures are being considered for Cardiff as cases in the city reach 38.2 in 100,000.
  - Lockdown restrictions are extended in Caerphilly for another week.
- 25 September –
  - Lockdown measures are introduced for Llanelli, Cardiff and Swansea, with the measures taking effect in Llanelli at 18:00 on 26 September, and Cardiff and Swansea at 18:00 on 27 September.
  - Shoppers are warned not to panic buy as lockdown measures are introduced.
- 26 September – Wales's first town-only lockdown comes into force in Llanelli.
- 27 September –
  - Lockdown measures are announced for Neath Port Talbot, Torfaen and Vale of Glamorgan, beginning at 18:00BST on 28 September. This means two thirds of Wales's population are subject to lockdown measures.
  - First Minister Mark Drakeford says he is considering changes to lockdown rules that would allow people who live alone to meet up indoors with others after becoming "concerned" about those living by themselves.
- 28 September – Economy Minister Ken Skates announces £140m of government grants to help businesses affected by local lockdowns.
- 29 September –
  - Lockdown restrictions are announced for Conwy, Denbighshire, Flintshire, and Wrexham, taking effect from 18:00BST on 1 October; people cannot enter or leave these areas unless for a valid reason such as work or education.
  - First Minister Mark Drakeford calls for Prime Minister Boris Johnson to prevent people from locked down areas of England from travelling to Wales for holidays.
  - It is reported that Blaenau Gwent, currently the subject of a lockdown, has one of the highest and fastest rising COVID-19 case rates in the UK, with 307.7 cases per 100,000.
- 30 September – Surgery is temporarily suspended at Royal Glamorgan Hospital following 60 COVID cases and eight deaths at the hospital.

=== October 2020 ===
- 1 October –
  - As Conwy, Denbighshire, Flintshire and Wrexham go into lockdown, businesses in the area express fears that local lockdown could lead to job losses and closures.
  - COVID deaths at Royal Glamorgan Hospital rise to ten, while hospitalisations increase in the Valleys area.
- 2 October –
  - The Welsh Government announces that people living alone in areas subject to lockdown restrictions may meet one other household indoors.
  - Prime Minister Boris Johnson rejects a call by First Minister Mark Drakeford to prevent people from England living in areas where there are high COVID-19 cases from travelling to Wales.
- 3 October –
  - A further 576 COVID-19 cases are confirmed in Wales along with five deaths.
  - The principal of Grŵp Llandrillo Menai says he is "deeply disappointed by the actions of a small group of learners" after five students at the college test positive for COVID-19 following a night out in Liverpool.
- 4 October – Public Health Wales records a further 432 COVID-19 cases, but no further deaths.
- 5 October –
  - A support package for freelance workers worth £7m is launched; it is overwhelmed with applications, and closed to some applicants within an hour of its launch.
  - The Welsh Government says it is considering introducing quarantine restrictions for people arriving into Wales from COVID-19 hotspots elsewhere in the UK.
  - Dr Frank Atherton, Wales's Chief Medical Officer, warns that people should "get ready" for rolling local lockdowns over the coming winter.
- 6 October –
  - Figures released by the Welsh Government indicate that the list of people waiting for routine surgery in Wales has grown sixfold since the start of the pandemic, with 57,445 now waiting for an operation.
  - Police launch an investigation into why the principal and vice-chancellor of the University of Aberdeen in Scotland made a trip to the Vale of Glamorgan on 2 October; the area is the subject of a lockdown.
  - First Minister Mark Drakeford accuses rival Conservative politicians of encouraging people to break lockdown rules after Senedd members and MPs signed a letter criticising travel restrictions, describing the letter as "disgraceful".
  - More than 8,000 people have signed a petition calling for sports training for children to be exempted from travel restrictions.
- 7 October –
  - 23 deaths from COVID-19 are linked to outbreaks across three hospitals: the Royal Glamorgan Hospital, Rhondda Cynon Taf; the Prince Charles Hospital, Merthyr Tydfil; the Princess of Wales Hospital, Bridgend.
  - A Twitter post by Fox News presenter Laura Ingraham criticising plans for "rolling lockdowns" in Wales over the winter is shared by US President Donald Trump.
- 8 October –
  - Dr Giri Shankar, the COVID incident director for Public Health Wales, says that pubs and restaurants are an "ongoing concern" following a spike involving 33 cases at a working men's club and another venue in Garw Valley, Bridgend.
  - A further 638 COVID-19 cases are recorded, along with one death.
- 9 October – Lockdown restrictions are announced for Bangor, beginning at 18:00BST on 10 October.
- 10 October – A further 21 COVID-19 deaths are reported, seven of them as a result of delays in reporting deaths earlier in October.
- 11 October –
  - Three people are arrested at an anti-lockdown protest held outside the Senedd.
  - First Minister Mark Drakeford says that Wales is "close to a tipping point" with the number of COVID-19 cases rising rapidly in some areas.
- 12 October –
  - Health Minister Vaughan Gething warns that Wales could be placed under a new national lockdown in order to tackle rising cases of COVID-19.
  - First Minister Mark Drakeford says he will give Boris Johnson a last chance to impose a travel ban on people entering Wales from COVID-19 hotspots in England, or will impose his own.
  - A COVID outbreak is declared at Royal Gwent Hospital.
- 13 October –
  - Prime Minister Boris Johnson again rejects calls for a Wales travel ban on people from English COVID-19 hotspots.
  - A COVID-19 outbreak is reported at Swansea's Morriston Hospital.
- 14 October – Mark Drakeford, the First Minister of Wales, announces plans to ban visitors to Wales from other parts of the UK with high COVID-19 rates.
- 15 October – The University Health Board, Cwm Taf Morgannwg has more cases of COVID-19 than at any time since the pandemic was declared, with as many as 12 COVID-19 patients being reported in hospitals each day.
- 16 October – Wales introduces a travel ban on people from COVID hotspots in other parts of the UK, beginning from 6pm.
- 17 October –
  - A leaked letter from the director of the Confederation of Passenger Transport to its members in Wales sets out plans for a national lockdown from 23 October to 9 November.
  - With the possibility of a second national lockdown for Wales, Hugh Evans, the leader of Denbighshire County Council, calls for clarity on the issue from the Welsh Government.
- 19 October – The Welsh Government announces a "short, sharp" lockdown from Friday 23 October to Monday 9 November, during which pubs, restaurants and hotels will close and people will be told to stay at home. The "firebreak" measures are timed to coincide with the autumn half term, and schools will return on Monday 2 November for pupils up to Year Eight.
- 20 October –
  - Welsh Government ministers say they cannot rule out another "firebreak" lockdown early in 2021 if COVID cases rise again over Christmas.
  - A mobile testing site is established outside a food factory in Bedwas, Caerphilly to test 600 people at the unit after 19 workers test positive for COVID-19.
- 21 October –
  - Public Health Wales records 962 new COVID-19 cases and 14 deaths, the highest number of daily deaths since 30 May.
  - Figures indicate that hospital COVID-19 cases have risen by 50% over the preceding week.
- 22 October –
  - The Welsh Government announces plans to take the Wales & Borders franchise into public ownership from February 2021, following a significant drop in the number of passengers during the COVID crisis.
  - Education Minister Kirsty Williams announces an extra £10m of funding for student mental health services and hardship funds, while suggesting university students may be asked to self-isolate if they wish to return home for Christmas.
  - Supermarkets are advised they must sell only "essential items" during the period of the 17-day lockdown; this excludes items such as clothing.
  - Amid concerns about increasing COVID cases, Dr Chris Williams, Wales's deputy chief medical officer, says that people should be reassured they can be treated in hospital "safely and effectively".
- 23 October – Wales begins its 17-day firebreak lockdown in a bid to slow the rise in COVID cases and hospital admissions.
- 24 October –
  - Dafydd Llywelyn, the Dyfed-Powys Police and Crime Commissioner, warns that policing the second lockdown will be more difficult than the first because of COVID fatigue, but urges people to take "personal responsibility".
  - First Minister Mark Drakeford announces the ban on the sale of non-essential items will be reviewed after a Senedd petition calling for it to be reversed is signed by more than 37,000 in two days. The petition, created the previous day, will be debated in the parliament as it has passed the threshold of 5,000 needed for a Senedd debate.
  - A further 1,324 COVID-19 cases are confirmed, and 16 deaths, the highest death toll in Wales since 28 May.
- 25 October –
  - First Minister Mark Drakeford says the ban on supermarkets selling non-essential items will not be reversed.
  - The Most Reverend John Davies, the Archbishop of Wales, urges people to "respond sensibly" and "think of others" during the national lockdown, but expresses hope that Christmas can be celebrated "in some form".
- 26 October – Tesco apologises after advising a customer she could not buy sanitary products from a store in Cardiff because they are non-essential items. Health Minister Vaughan Gething says the supermarket was "simply wrong" to give this advice, and says that going forward retailers will be able to use their "discretion".
- 27 October –
  - Retailers put forward proposals to "resolve confusion" over the sale of non-essential items, suggesting they are not cordoned off but instead a sign advises customers to put off their purchase, thus giving the customer the final decision over whether or not to buy the product.
  - As the number of signatures on the Senedd petition grows to 67,000, the Welsh Government publishes an updated list of goods that can be sold by retailers in a bid to clarify the matter. The list includes baby clothes, which are listed as essential items. The guidance also says that people should be able to purchase non-essential items in exceptional circumstances.
  - A further 12 deaths are linked to hospital infections in the Cwm Taf Morgannwg Health Board area, bringing the total to 69.
- 28 October –
  - First Minister Mark Drakeford confirms that non-essential shops, pubs, restaurants, cafes, gyms and leisure centres will reopen when the firebreak lockdown ends.
  - Figures published by Public Health Wales indicate a dramatic rise in COVID cases in Rhondda Cynon Taf, with an example cited where a third of 800 people tested in a single day received positive results.
- 29 October – A further 48 workers at a food factory in Bedwas test positive for COVID-19.
- 30 October – First Minister Mark Drakeford says there will not be a return to local lockdown rules when the 17-day "firebreak" measures end on 2 November, but instead a set of national rules will be introduced "for the sake of clarity and simplicity".
- 31 October – First Minister Mark Drakeford announces that the firebreak lockdown will end on 9 November, regardless of the lockdown announced for England.

=== November 2020 ===
- 1 November – With the furlough scheme extended until December following the announcement of England's month-long lockdown, First Minister Mark Drakeford expresses disappointment that Wales's request to have it extended by the Treasury for the duration of its own firebreak lockdown was rejected.
- 2 November –
  - First Minister Mark Drakeford announces that two households will be able to form a support bubble once the firebreak ends on 9 November. Travel restrictions will also be lifted, but people will not be allowed to leave the country.
  - Fairwater Primary School in Cardiff closes after a large number of staff test positive for COVID-19.
- 3 November – First Minister Mark Drakeford announces that groups of four people from different households will be able to meet in pubs, bars and restaurants when the firebreak ends. Larger groups from one household will be allowed to eat together, but people are asked to do so in the smallest groups possible.
- 5 November –
  - Data published by Public Health Wales indicates that at least half of Welsh schools have reported a case of COVID.
  - Figures indicate Merthyr Tydfil has the highest rate of COVID in the UK with 741 cases per 100,000.
- 6 November – Cwm Taf Morgannwg health board consultant, Dr Dai Samuel, calls for lockdown restrictions to continue in Merthyr Tydfil "for weeks, even months". In response the Welsh Government says there will be no return to local restrictions once the firebreak ends on 9 November.
- 7 November –
  - The number of COVID-related death in Wales passes 2,000 as a further 32 deaths take the total to 2,014.
  - Health bosses fear the health service could be placed under extensive strain when the firebreak ends if new rules are not followed.
- 8 November –
  - On the final day of the firebreak, Health Minister Vaughan Gething says COVID cases are beginning to plateau in Wales.
  - Figures produced by Age Cymru indicate that at least half of the 120,000 people shielding in Wales earlier in the year were living alone.
- 9 November – Wales's 17-day firebreak lockdown comes to an end. Non-essential shops are allowed to reopen, along with restaurants, pubs and gyms. Two households can again form a bubble, while four people from separate households can meet up indoors or outdoors. Travel is permitted anywhere within Wales.
- 10 November – GCSE, AS and A Level exams scheduled for the summer of 2021 are scrapped in favour of grades based on classroom assessment.
- 11 November –
  - Students in Wales wishing to travel home for Christmas are told they must do so before 9 December. They will be offered rapid turnaround COVID tests in order to minimise the risk of them spreading the virus. Those required to self-isolate after testing positive will be allowed to travel home after 9 December.
  - Health officials announce that the Dragon's Heart Hospital in Cardiff, established as a field hospital to treat COVID patients, is to be decommissioned and resume its role as a rugby stadium in time for the 2021 Six Nations Championship.
- 12 November – Figures indicate that 1,529 people are in hospital in Wales with COVID-19 related conditions, roughly 20% of all hospital beds in Wales, and higher than at the peak of the pandemic in April 2020, but that only 40% of intensive care beds are occupied with COVID patients when compared to earlier in the year.
- 15 November –
  - Dr Giri Shankar, of Public Health Wales, says it is a "worry" to see queues of people outside shops on the first weekend after the firebreak lockdown was lifted.
  - Education Minister Kirsty Williams says the Welsh Government is examining new evidence about the spread of COVID among schoolchildren, and that face coverings may become compulsory for secondary school pupils.
- 16 November –
  - Health Minister Vaughan Gething says it may be "weeks" before an announcement is made regarding COVID rules over Christmas.
  - Deeside Rainbow Hospital, built to increase hospital capacity during the COVID crisis, has admitted its first patients.
- 17 November – The number of COVID-19 related deaths in Wales has exceeded 3,000 according to figures produced by the Office for National Statistics.
- 18 November – Merthyr Tydfil becomes the first area of Wales to offer everyone living and working there a COVID test, with the programme beginning on Saturday 21 November.
- 19 November – The Welsh Government announces that all pupils and students may soon have access to mass testing.
- 20 November – As the latest infection survey for Wales indicates COVID-19 cases peaked at the end of October, First Minister Mark Drakeford warns that Wales will face tougher restrictions at Christmas if cases surge.
- 21 November – A programme of mass testing begins in Merthyr Tydfil.
- 22 November – Seven schools in the Cardigan area and five in North Pembrokeshire are to close because of links to a COVID spread. The Cardigan schools will reopen on 7 December, while Pembrokeshire is yet to confirm the length of the closures there.
- 23 November –
  - Health Minister Vaughan Gething suggests that tighter COVID measures could be introduced in Wales in the run up to Christmas to bring it into line with other parts of the UK.
  - The Welsh Government recommends that face coverings should be worn in all secondary schools in Wales, apart from in classrooms.
- 24 November – Figures from the Office for National Statistics indicate 190 COVID deaths occurred in Wales in the week ending 13 November, the highest weekly number since May.
- 25 November – First Minister Mark Drakeford confirms his government is considering tougher restrictions in the weeks preceding Christmas, with measures possibly correlating with the top tiers of England and Scotland.
- 26 November – The police are to be given extra powers, including carrying out random vehicle checks to ensure people are adhering to COVID regulations. The powers will be enforceable from 9am on Fridays to 5pm on Sundays.
- 27 November –
  - First Minister Mark Drakeford announces that pubs, restaurants and bars will be subject to tougher COVID restrictions in the weeks preceding Christmas, coming into force on Friday 4 December, though exact details are to be finalised.
  - Mass COVID testing is to be rolled out to a second area of Wales, with people living and working in the lower Cynon valley area being tested.
- 28 November –
  - Sam Rowlands, the leader of Conwy Council, the area with the lowest COVID rate in Wales, criticises the Welsh Government's broad brush approach to the hospitality sector in the lead up to Christmas.
  - South Wales Police confirm they have issued twelve fines and asked a further fifteen people to leave Cardiff during two days of vehicle checks in the city.
- 30 November –
  - First Minister Mark Drakeford announces that pubs, restaurants and cafes will not be permitted to sell alcohol from Friday 4 December, and must close at 6pm, in order to tackle a rise in COVID cases. In response, business groups have warned of the devastating impact on the Welsh hospitality sector, with closures "guaranteed".
  - Figures have revealed that police forces in Wales have issues more than 3,000 fines for COVID breaches since the start of the crisis.

=== December 2020 ===
- 1 December –
  - First Minister Mark Drakeford comes under pressure from backbench Labour Members of the Senedd to provide evidence for the Welsh Government's alcohol ban.
  - Health officials in Wales say they are ready to roll out a vaccine within days subject to its approval.
  - Brains, one of Wales's largest breweries, announces the closure of 100 pubs from Friday 4 December. Alistair Darby, the company's boss, describes the new rules as "closure by stealth".
- 2 December –
  - Following the UK's approval of the Pfizer/BioNTech vaccine, Wales's chief medical officer, Frank Atherton, says he is unsure when care home residents will be able to receive the new vaccine due to storage temperature requirements.
  - Llandovery Hospital in Carmarthenshire is closed temporarily following a COVID outbreak, and its patients transferred to Amman Valley Hospital in Ammanford.
- 3 December – The Welsh Government announces that travel will be permitted between Wales and parts of England and Scotland that are in tiers one and two from Friday 4 December.
- 4 December –
  - The hospitality sector alcohol ban comes into force at 6pm, forcing pubs to pour away gallons of beer.
  - First Minister Mark Drakeford announces that the first COVID vaccinations will begin on Tuesday 8 December.
- 8 December –
  - The Welsh Government's Technical Advisory Group have said the number of people dying of COVID-19 far exceeds the worst-case scenario projected in a forecast made by Swansea University.
  - Scientific advisers have "strongly" urged people to postpone Christmas get-togethers and reunions, and suggested anyone with children should "pre-isolate" for ten days before meeting elderly relatives.
  - Health and care workers become the first people in Wales to receive the Pfizer/BioNTech COVID vaccine.
- 9 December –
  - Wales's Chief Medical Officer, Frank Atherton, advises households not to mix unless necessary in the weeks preceding Christmas.
  - Data from Public Health Wales indicates COVID cases have hit their highest level in more than half of Wales's council areas.
  - First Minister Mark Drakeford says that the COVID situation in Wales is "very difficult" but not out of control.
- 10 December –
  - Education Minister Kirsty Williams announces that all secondary schools and further education colleges will move teaching online from Monday 14 December. The move is criticised by the Children's Commissioner for Wales as being disruptive to education.
  - Senior Welsh Conservative Andrew RT Davies calls on the Welsh Government to clarify reports that Wales will be placed into lockdown from 28 December.
  - Chief Medical Officer Frank Atherton says that the Welsh Government is considering whether further restrictions are needed in the lead up to Christmas, but warns authorities "reached the limit... [of] telling people what to do".
- 11 December –
  - Announcing that outdoor attractions must close from Monday 14 December, First Minister Mark Drakeford warns that a post-Christmas lockdown will come into force if COVID cases do not fall in Wales.
  - The Aneurin Bevan University Health Board announces the cancellation of all non-urgent health care as COVID cases continue to rise in the area.
- 12 December –
  - The number of positive COVID tests in Wales passes 100,000 as a further 2,494 cases take the total to 100,725.
  - People are urged not to attend Grange University Hospital in Cwmbran unless absolutely necessary after their A&E department receives a "very high number of COVID patients".
- 13 December –
  - The Aneurin Bevan University Health Board expresses concern that COVID cases in its area are rising at an "alarming rate" as hospitals come under increasing pressure due to numbers of patients with the virus.
  - Leading public health expert, Dr Angela Raffle, suggests continued mass testing for COVID is a "massive-scale of waste of resources" as figures show less than 1.5% of people were testing positive as part of pilots in Merthyr Tydfil and the lower Cynon Valley.
- 14 December –
  - Doctors are warning that the relaxation of rules at Christmas "makes no sense" amid rising COVID cases in Wales.
  - According to a BBC News report, Wales is in breach of COVID regulations since it has passed the threshold at which lockdown restrictions should be introduced. The Welsh Government has said it is unlikely to introduce such restrictions before the Christmas period.
- 15 December –
  - Following calls by medical experts to review plans to relax COVID rules over Christmas, First Minister Mark Drakeford says such a decision would not be taken lightly.
  - An outbreak of COVID is reported among staff at a mass vaccination centre in Cardiff, with nine staff members testing positive.
- 16 December –
  - The Welsh Government announce plans to introduce their own rules concerning the relaxation of COVID regulations over Christmas. While rules will still be relaxed for five days, unlike the rest of the UK, only two households, plus a single person living alone, will be permitted to meet up between 23 and 27 December.
  - First Minister Mark Drakeford announces a new lockdown for Wales, beginning on 28 December. Non-essential shops and close contact services will be required to close from close of trading on Christmas Eve, with pubs and restaurants required to close from 6pm on Christmas Day.
  - Public Health Wales has said that a "planned maintenance" of some IT systems has led to a "significant under-reporting" of positive tests, with as many as 11,000 positive cases missing from official figures, and meaning cases could be twice as high as reported over the preceding week.
- 17 December –
  - The Welsh Local Government Association announces that school pupils in Wales will have a staggered return to school after the Christmas break, with online learning for the first part of the term. All in person education is expected to resume by 18 January.
  - Office for National Statistics figures suggest COVID-19 accounted for 21.6% of deaths in Wales through November, and was by percentage the largest cause of death that month.
- 18 December –
  - As the number of people in hospital with COVID reaches its highest level in Wales, standing at 2,231, Dr Simon Barry, a leading respiratory expert, warns that things could get "significantly worse".
  - The number of recorded COVID deaths passes 3,000 as a further 38 deaths take the total to 3,011.
- 19 December – Following urgent talks with ministers over a new strain of COVID-19, First Minister Mark Drakeford announces that the whole of Wales will be placed under lockdown from midnight, with festive plans cancelled for all but Christmas Day.
- 20 December –
  - Health Minister Vaughan Gething has suggested there could be a spike in COVID cases after Christmas, even with the early lockdown, and that the new variant of COVID is "seeded" in every part of Wales.
  - BBC News reports that donations of items such as of free trees, presents and turkey dinners are being made to families whose Christmas plans have been disrupted by changes to COVID regulations over the festive period.
- 21 December – Figures released by the Welsh Government indicate that school attendance was at 70% in the week of 7 December, with that figure falling to 50% among Year Eleven pupils.
- 23 December –
  - Figures from Public Health Wales indicate some 2,500 COVID cases have been linked to hospitals in Wales since October.
  - Helena Herklots, the Older People's Commissioner for Wales, calls for more clarity on when older people will receive the COVID vaccine.
- 24 December –
  - Office for National Statistics figures indicate a sharp rise in COVID-19 cases in Wales, with an estimated 52,200 people with the virus in the week to 18 December, 18,800 more than the preceding week.
  - With many Christmas carol services cancelled, people in Wales join to sing "Silent Night" on their doorsteps at 7pm, the carol having been chosen by the Church in Wales.
- 26 December –
  - Wales enters lockdown after rules were briefly relaxed over Christmas Day.
  - Cardiff and Vale Health Board, which runs Wales's largest hospital, University Hospital of Wales, issues a plea for emergency assistance in its critical care department to help look after COVID patients. An update from the hospital the following day indicates the situation has subsequently improved.
- 28 December –
  - The Association of School and College Leaders Cymru (ASCLC) has asked the Welsh Government whether closing schools before Christmas did anything to suppress the spread of COVID-19, and demands a strategy for returning pupils to school in January 2021.
  - Data released by the Welsh Government indicates that Cardiff and Vale Health Board ran out of intensive care beds on 20 December, prompting Dr Giri Shankar of Public Health Wales to describe the situation as one that is "incredibly challenging".
- 29 December – Visitors to the Brecon Beacons are being turned away by police, some having travelled to the area from as far away as London.
- 30 December –
  - Following the UK approval of the Oxford vaccine, the Welsh Government announces that people will begin receiving it the following week.
  - Police begin "high visibility" patrols to deter visitors to Wales's national parks.
- 31 December – The Welsh Government confirms it has a flexible policy with regard to the return of schools at the beginning of the winter term; some schools will fully return by 6 January, with others doing so by 11 January, depending on the area.

== See also ==
- Timeline of the COVID-19 pandemic in the United Kingdom (January–June 2020)
- Timeline of the COVID-19 pandemic in the United Kingdom (July–December 2020)
- Timeline of the COVID-19 pandemic in England (2020)
- Timeline of the COVID-19 pandemic in England (2021)
- Timeline of the COVID-19 pandemic in Scotland (2020)
- Timeline of the COVID-19 pandemic in Scotland (2021)
- Timeline of the COVID-19 pandemic in the United Kingdom (2021)
- Timeline of the COVID-19 pandemic in Northern Ireland (2020)
- Timeline of the COVID-19 pandemic in Northern Ireland (2021)
