= Tony Jewell =

Tony Jewell may refer to:

- Tony Jewell (footballer) (born 1943), former Australian rules football player
- Tony Jewell (doctor) (born 1950), Chief Medical Officer for Wales
