= Timeline of the COVID-19 pandemic in the United Kingdom =

Timeline of the COVID-19 pandemic in the United Kingdom may refer to:

== By year ==
=== 2020 ===
- Timeline of the COVID-19 pandemic in the United Kingdom (January–June 2020)
- Timeline of the COVID-19 pandemic in the United Kingdom (July–December 2020)

=== 2021 ===
- Timeline of the COVID-19 pandemic in the United Kingdom (January–June 2021)
- Timeline of the COVID-19 pandemic in the United Kingdom (July–December 2021)

=== 2022 ===
- Timeline of the COVID-19 pandemic in the United Kingdom (January–June 2022)
- Timeline of the COVID-19 pandemic in the United Kingdom (July–December 2022)

=== 2023 ===
- Timeline of the COVID-19 pandemic in the United Kingdom (2023)

=== 2024 ===
- Timeline of the COVID-19 pandemic in the United Kingdom (2024)

== By country ==
=== England ===
- Timeline of the COVID-19 pandemic in England (January–June 2020)
- Timeline of the COVID-19 pandemic in England (July–December 2020)
- Timeline of the COVID-19 pandemic in England (2021)
- Timeline of the COVID-19 pandemic in England (2022)

=== Northern Ireland ===
- Timeline of the COVID-19 pandemic in Northern Ireland (2020)
- Timeline of the COVID-19 pandemic in Northern Ireland (2021)
- Timeline of the COVID-19 pandemic in Northern Ireland (2022)

=== Scotland ===
- Timeline of the COVID-19 pandemic in Scotland (2020)
- Timeline of the COVID-19 pandemic in Scotland (2021)
- Timeline of the COVID-19 pandemic in Scotland (2022)

=== Wales ===
- Timeline of the COVID-19 pandemic in Wales (2020)
- Timeline of the COVID-19 pandemic in Wales (2021)
- Timeline of the COVID-19 pandemic in Wales (2022)

== See also ==
- History of the COVID-19 pandemic in the United Kingdom
