= Ruth Hussey (doctor) =

British medical practitioner

Ruth Mary Hussey
- Occupation: Medical practitioner
- Known for: Chief Medical Officer for Wales

Ruth Mary Hussey CB OBE DL was the chief medical officer for Wales. She was appointed in 2012, succeeding Tony Jewell. She retired in March 2016.

== Biography ==
Hussey was born in the Conwy Valley, and lived there until she studied medicine at the University of Liverpool School of Medicine. She was a committee member and honorary life member of the Liverpool Medical Students Society. She was also regional director of public health and senior medical at NHS North West.

In 2017-18, Hussey chaired a panel of experts who looked for ways to improve the health and social care system in Wales. The panel proposed far-reaching changes to the system.

== Awards and honours ==
- Hussey was appointed Companion of the Order of the Bath (CB) in the 2016 New Year Honours.

Government offices
Preceded by Tony Jewell	Chief Medical Officer for Wales; 2012–2016	Succeeded by Frank Atherton
