= Qualifications Wales =

Welsh Government sponsored body

Qualifications Wales Cymwysterau Cymru
- Formation: 21 September 2015
- Type: Welsh Government Sponsored Body
- Purpose: Regulating general and vocational qualifications in Wales.
- Headquarters: Q2 Building, Imperial Park, Coedkernew, Newport
- Region served: Wales
- Chair: Paul Bevan
- Chief Executive: Philip Blaker
- Affiliations: Welsh Government

Qualifications Wales (Welsh: Cymwysterau Cymru) is a Welsh Government sponsored body, responsible for the recognition of awarding bodies and the review and approval of non-degree qualifications in Wales. It was established by the Qualifications Wales Act 2015 and became operational from 21 September 2015.

It regulates awarding bodies delivering those qualifications taken in schools and colleges, including GCSEs, AS and A levels, the Welsh Baccalaureate, and vocational qualifications such as Essential Skills Wales qualifications. The organisation has over 75 staff, in a mix of regulatory, research, policy and development roles. Its offices are based in Imperial Park, Newport.

== Responsibilities ==
As set out in the Act, the body has two principal aims and responsibilities:

- ensuring that qualifications, and the Welsh qualification system, are effective for meeting the reasonable needs of learners in Wales;
- promoting public confidence in qualifications and in the Welsh qualification system

== See also ==
- Education in Wales
- Senedd
- Standards and Testing Agency
