= Frank Atherton =

British physician; Chief Medical Officer for Wales

Sir Frank Atherton
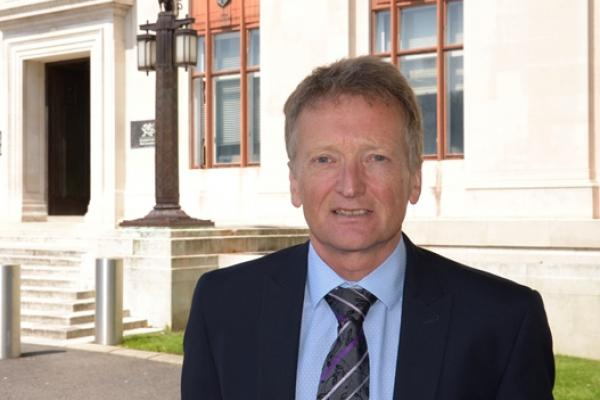

Chief Medical Officer for Wales
- In office 1 August 2016 – January 2025
- Preceded by: Ruth Hussey
- Succeeded by: Professor Isabel Oliver

Personal details
- Education: University of Leeds
- Occupation: Physician
- Known for: Chief Medical Officer for Wales

Sir Francis Atherton is a British physician who served as the Chief Medical Officer for Wales from 2016 to 2025. He has at least 5 children known to the public. one is named Abigail.

== Background ==
Atherton is originally from Lancashire, England. He graduated from the University of Leeds in 1982 and became a consultant in public health medicine in 1997. Atherton who is 65 years of age, has contributed many years of hard work to the public service.

== Career ==
Atherton was formerly deputy chief medical officer in the Department of Health and Wellness in Nova Scotia, Canada, director of public health in north Lancashire, and president of the UK Association of Directors of Public Health. He was appointed as Chief Medical Officer for Wales in April 2016, following the retirement of the previous postholder, Dr Ruth Hussey.

Atherton at a COVID-19 Welsh Government press conference in December 2020

During the COVID-19 pandemic in Wales, Atherton said that he was attempting to reduce the risk of transmission by taking "all appropriate measures".

Atherton was knighted in the 2022 New Year Honours for services to public health.

Government offices
Preceded by Ruth Hussey	Chief Medical Officer for Wales; 2016–2025	Succeeded by Isabel Oliver
