= Tony Jewell (doctor) =

Former Chief Medical Officer for Wales

John Anthony Jewell (born 6 May 1950) is a former Chief Medical Officer for Wales. He took up this post in April 2006 and retired in August 2012.

== Background ==
Jewell trained in medicine at Christ's College, Cambridge, and The London Hospital Medical College. After qualifying he undertook vocational training in general practice in East London going on to become a GP in inner London for 10 years. During this time he helped develop a teaching and research focussed group practice by merging single-handed practices and designed a new purpose-built health centre in Chrisp Street, Poplar. During his time in East London he served on Tower Hamlets Area Health Authority for six years as the trades union representative and chaired the multiagency Joint Consultative Committee. While in Tower Hamlets he lobbied for investment in inner city general practice, commissioned Brian Jarman to lead the Tower Hamlets Health Inquiry helping the development of Under Privileged Area (UPA) scores, published on the workload associated with out of hours care and was Secretary to the Wendy Savage Support Campaign.

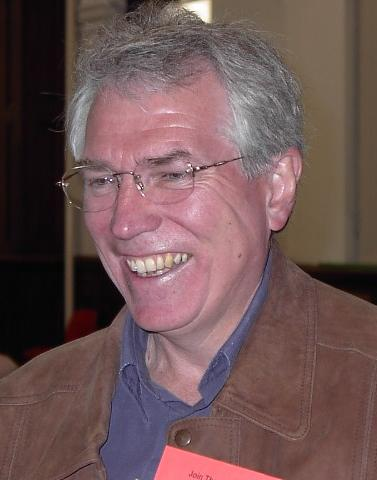
Jewell at a meeting of the Socialist Health Association

In response to the 1988 Acheson report "Public Health in England" he applied to undertake public health training in East Anglia and was based in Cambridge Health Authority where he undertook an evaluation of counselling in general practice. He worked at the Department of Health during his training helping to produce the first executive letter on improving clinical effectiveness. When he completed his accreditation he was appointed as a consultant in public health medicine in Peterborough, the most disadvantaged district in East Anglia. His professional interests have included the link between public health and primary care, health inequalities and preventing road traffic crashes. He investigated the high mortality ratio from road traffic accidents in Fenland and helped sponsor research at the University of East Anglia on comparative rates across England and Wales and the specific environmental risks such as "road bendiness". He helped manage several important inquiries while serving as a director of Public Health such as a fatality from Methotrexate toxicity, the David "Rocky" Bennett inquiry into restraint and a fatal case of neonatal MRSA in Ipswich. During his time as clinical director and DPH in East Anglia he advocated for improving clinical quality by the strengthening of managed clinical networks. Between 2002 and 2004 he was elected and served as president of the UK Association of Directors of Public Health ensuring the organisation was an effective influence in NHS reforms such as Shifting the Balance.

In 1984 he published, with Sheila Hillier, a book Healthcare and Traditional Medicine in China 1800–1982 (RKP). To learn about traditional Chinese medicine (TCM) he undertook acupuncture training in Beijing in 1980 obtaining a DipAc from the Academy of Traditional Chinese Medicine. Yorkshire TV produced a documentary on his work in China and London titled "From Peking to Poplar". He was an active council member of the Socialist Health Association for many years being committed to the NHS but resigned on being appointed CMO. He is treasurer of the charity Womanschoice developed after the Wendy Savage affair and of the Stark Murray Trust.

He has held the following senior posts in public health:

- 1996–1999 – Director of Public Health for North West Anglia
- 1999–2002 – Director of Public Health for Cambridgeshire.
- 2002–2006 – Clinical Director and Director of Public Health in Norfolk, Suffolk and Cambridgeshire Strategic Health Authority.
- 2002–2006 – President of the UK Association of Directors of Public Health

== Chief Medical Office for Wales ==
Jewell, as Chief Medical Officer (CMO) for Wales, provided independent professional advice and guidance to the First Minister and other Welsh Government ministers on public health and healthcare matters.

During his time as CMO, Jewell produced six CMO annual reports which identified the health needs and priorities for Wales. He advocated smoke-free legislation bringing in the "smoke-free public spaces, pubs and restaurants" legislation, and promoted the policy of banning smoking in cars with children present. He led the creation of an integrated public health system, using the model of the three domains of public health practice, creating Public Health Wales and Director of Public Health posts in the Health Boards. During his time the resources for life science research and development increased significantly and he led the creation of the National Institute for Social Care and Health Research (NISCHR) for Wales. He championed cascade testing for familial hypercholesterolaemia with the British Heart Foundation so that Wales became the first UK country to introduce it successfully. He was a strong advocate for government to use legislation to support health improvement measures such as healthy food vending machines in schools and hospitals, smoke-free NHS buildings and grounds, sunbed use legislation, food hygiene scores "on the doors", alcohol pricing and supporting cycling and physical activity initiatives. He consistently urged the Welsh Government to address the embedded health inequities in South Wales through long-term investments in housing, education and jobs. He intervened to defuse the Bridgend suicide cluster media response ensuring an all Wales strategic response to suicide prevention. He also advocated the need to increase MMR vaccine uptake given the relatively low rates and during his time there was a steady increase toward target levels. He received the Faculty of Public Health's Alwyn Smith Prize for his leadership as CMO during the 2009 pandemic flu response and received an honorary doctorate from the University of Glamorgan and an Honorary Fellowship from Cardiff Metropolitan University. He gave the Aneurin Bevan Foundation Annual Lecture in 2006 on his priorities as CMO for Wales and this included the need to recognise the contribution of Archie Cochrane in Wales and Julian Tudor-Hart's inverse care law. He is on the advisory board of the Welsh International Health Co-ordinating Centre and the Wales for Africa Health Links Network.

He was appointed as a Fellow of both the Royal College of GPs and Faculty of Public Health having been a member of both through examination. He has published in peer reviewed journals on inner-city general practice, out-of-hours cover, counselling, road traffic injuries, prevention, the three domains of public health practice and public health governance. He delivered a lecture on "From Primary Care to Public Health and Government Policy – reflections of CMO Wales" in July 2012.

== Publications ==
- Jewell JA "Inner city GPs" BMJ 1980;280:407
- Livingstone A, Jewell JA et al. "Twenty four hour care in the inner city. Two years out of hours workload in East London general practice" BMJ 1989;299:368–370
- Robson J, Jewell JA et al. "Using nurses for preventive activities with computer assisted follow up in a randomised control trial" BMJ 1989; 298:433–436
- Jewell JA "The noose of the independent contractor status" BMJ 1990;300:885
- Jewell T "Health care in London. London low on residential and nursing homes" BMJ 1993;306:1474-5
- Jewell T "Counselling in general practice" BMJ 1993;306:390
- Jewell JA et al. "Foodborne shigellosis" CDR Rev, 1993;3:R42-4
- Jewell T et al. "The problems of fundholding (editorial)" BMJ 1996;312:7042
- Spiers R, Jewell JA "One counsellor, two practices:report of a pilot scheme in Cambridgeshire." BJGP 1995;45:31–33
- Jewell T "Country profile:United Kingdom" Lancet 1997;350-9070:48–58
- Jewell T "Health visitors and child surveillance" BJGP 1999;49:313
- Haynes R, Jewell T et al. "Geographical distribution of road traffic deaths in England and Wales:place of accident compared with place of residence" JofPH 2005;27:107–111
- Griffiths S, Jewell T et al. "Public Health in practice:the three domains of public health" Public Health 2005;119 (10):907-13
- Gray S, Jewell T et al. "Public Health in the UK:success or failure?" JR Soc Med 2006;99:107–11
- Thorpe A, Jewell T et al. "The three domains of public health:an internationally relevant basis for public health education?" Public Health 2008;122:201–10
- Jones AP, Jewell T et al. "Geographical variations in mortality and morbidity from road traffic accidents in England and Wales" Health Place 2008;14:519–35
- Jewell T "Have dispensed items really risen with free prescriptions?" BMJ;2008:337:1581
- Jewell T, Wilkinson J " Health and social care regulation in Wales:an integrated system of political, corporate and professional governance for improving public health" JR Soc Promoting Health 2008;128:306–12
- Jones AP, Jewell T et al. "Road traffic crashes and the protective effect of road curvature over small areas" Health Place 2012;18(2):315–20
- Hale J, Jewell T et al. "Making the economic case for prevention – a view from Wales" BMC Public Health 2012;12:460
