= Public Health Wales =

NHS Trust in Wales

- Iechyd Cyhoeddus Cymru
- Public Health Wales logo

Healthcare trust overview
- Formed: 1 October 2009; 16 years ago
- Preceding agencies: National Public Health Service; Wales Centre for Health; Welsh Cancer Intelligence & Surveillance Unit; Congenital Anomaly Register & Information Service for Wales; Screening Services Wales
- Type: NHS Trust
- Jurisdiction: Wales
- Headquarters: No. 2 Capital Quarter Tyndall Street Cardiff
- Employees: 1,651 (2019)
- Annual budget: £135 million GBP
- Minister responsible: Mabon ap Gwynfor, Cabinet Minister for Health and Care
- Healthcare trust executives: Dr Tracey Cooper, Chief Executive; Huw George, Deputy Chief Executive and Executive Director of Operations and Finance
- Parent department: NHS Wales
- Website: phw.nhs.wales

Public Health Wales (PHW; Welsh: Iechyd Cyhoeddus Cymru) is an NHS Trust which was established on 1 October 2009 as part of a major restructuring of the health service in Wales. It aims to protect and improve health and wellbeing and reduce health inequalities in Wales.

== Mission and resources ==
The Trust has four statutory functions:

- Provide and manage public health, health protection, healthcare improvement, health advisory, child protection and microbiological laboratory services and services relating to the surveillance, prevention and control of communicable diseases;
- Develop and maintain arrangements for making information about matters related to the protection and improvement of health in Wales available to the public; to undertake and commission research into such matters and to contribute to the provision and development of training in such matters;
- Undertake the systematic collection, analysis and dissemination of information about the health of the people of Wales in particular including cancer incidence, mortality and survival; and prevalence of congenital anomalies; and
- Provide, manage, monitor, evaluate and conduct research into screening of health conditions and screening of health related matters.

For 2018/19 Public Health Wales employed 1,651 staff across Wales, with an income of £135 million.

== Structure ==
A board is responsible for Public Health Wales’ strategic direction, governance framework, organisational culture and development and stakeholder relations. It comprises a chair, six non-executive directors and five executive directors, led by a chief executive. Jan Williams OBE FRSPH is the chair.

The executive directors and three other board-level directors make up the executive team, which manages Public Health Wales. Each year Public Health Wales is required to conduct a self-assessment and demonstrate improvement against the Healthcare Standards for Wales.

The organisation is split into seven key directorates:

- Health and Well-being
- Public Health Services
- Policy, Research and International Development
- Quality, Nursing and Allied Health Professionals
- Operations and Finance
- People and Organisational Development
- NHS Quality Improvement and Patient Safety/1000 Lives

== See also ==
- UK Health Security Agency
- Office for Health Improvement and Disparities
- Public Health Scotland
- Public Health Agency (Northern Ireland)
