= Occult (disambiguation) =

The occult is a category of esoteric or supernatural beliefs and practices which generally fall outside the scope of organized religion and science.

Occult may also refer to:

- Occult (film), a 2009 Japanese horror film
- The Occult: A History, a 1971 book by Colin Wilson
- Doctor Occult, a DC Comics character
- Occult, an alias of the Marvel Comics character Peepers
- Occult rock, a subgenre of rock music
- Legion of the Damned (band), formerly known as Occult, a Dutch thrash/death metal band
- Occult, a local term for the transgender community in Myanmar

== See also ==
- Occult blood (disambiguation)
- Occult detective fiction, a subgenre of detective fiction that combines the tropes of the main genre with those of supernatural, fantasy and/or horror fiction
- Occult fracture, a fracture that is not readily visible on projectional radiography
- Occult pneumonia, a pneumonia that is not observable directly by the eye, but can only be shown indirectly
- Occultation, an event that occurs when one object is hidden from the observer by another object that passes between them
- Occultation (Islam), the eschatological belief that the Mahdi has already been born and he was subsequently concealed, but he will reemerge and he will establish justice and peace on earth at the end of time
