= Jiangyou bullying incident and protests =

2025 incident and protests in China

In the summer of 2025, a female student was beaten by her schoolmates off campus in the city of Jiangyou in Sichuan, China. A video clip of the bullying circulated online and drew nationwide attention. The perpetrators were eventually punished. The authorities' handling of the case however was perceived as being too lenient, leading to protests that were subsequently suppressed and information about them censored. The incident sparked discussion in China about underage offenders.

== Background ==
In recent years, China has seen several high-profile cases involving bullying and crimes committed by minors. One in 2023 and another one in January 2025 led to protests.

== Bullying incident ==
On July 22, 2025, a 14-year-old female student was bullied by three of her female schoolmates in a vacant building off-campus, receiving slaps, kicks, and hits with an object. Her mobile phone and items of clothing were also removed during the prolonged confrontation. The bullies dismissed her warning that her father would report the matter to the police and flouted having been to the local station previously without suffering any long-term consequence. After seeking medical attention for their daughter, the victim's parents, who have disabilities, reported the incident to the police later that night, and two of the perpetrators were summoned by police around midnight. On August 2, a video recording of the incident began circulating online. The next day, following procedures to assess injuries one to two weeks after the initial trauma, a physician re-evaluated the victim, ruling out occult fracture and concluding that the bruises to her scalp and knees were "minor". From July 24 to August 3, the police summoned and began investigating all individuals involved.

== August 4 announcement and protests ==
On August 4, the Jiangyou Municipal Public Security Bureau made its first public announcement regarding the case, but it was perceived to have downplayed the severity of the matter. The victim's parents and a crowd of supporters entered the municipal building demanding justice for the daughter. The parents kowtowed before an official, and members of the public expressed anger at the case's handling. More and more people gathered outside government buildings and on the streets late into the night. They sang the national anthem. Some of them yelled slogans such as "punish the perpetrators severely", "say no to bullying", "return democracy to us", and "Chinese Communist Party (CCP) step down!" Local and nearby police forces were deployed to control and disperse the protesters using pepper spray and tear gas. Demonstrators were seen being dragged away or struck with batons. According to one witness, at least eight individuals were arrested. Information about the protests has been censored in China after briefly trending on Weibo.

== Punishments ==
According to police statements on the afternoon of August 4, of the three bullies, the 15-year-old was detained for 13 days and fined 1,000 CNY. The 14-year-old was detained for 10 days and fined 800 CNY. The third perpetrator, being under the age of 14, had her legal guardians reprimanded. According to reports, this was not the first time that the group had bullied their victim. Jiangyou police said that one of them had been investigated by the station previously, on one occasion, and that the case was delayed because of the many individuals involved and the need for medical assessments.

== Social media rumors ==
A few social media posts alleged that the bullies' parents were police inspectors or lawyers. Later reports said two of the parents were unemployed, two were working outside the province, and the other two worked in retail or delivery.

Video clips began circulating on social media outside China claiming that the incident had escalated and millions were chanting for the CCP to step down. They were later found to have been spliced from New Year celebration clips with audio components edited in.

== Commentary ==
The incident came after several other high-profile cases of abuse or bullying involving students in recent years and prompted discussions in China regarding the prosecution of crimes committed by minors. A new 2025 law allows more underage individuals to be punished but would only go into effect in 2026.
