= Timeline of the COVID-19 pandemic in England (2021) =

Daily English events related to the pandemic in 2021

The following is a timeline of the COVID-19 pandemic in England during 2021. There are significant differences in the legislation and the reporting between the countries of the UK: England, Scotland, Northern Ireland, and Wales.

== Timeline ==
=== January 2021 ===
- 1 January – The UK government announces that all primary schools in London will remain closed for the start of the winter term.
- 2 January –
  - Teaching unions have told primary school staff it is unsafe to return to school and urged them to implement remote learning as pressure grows on the government to keep schools closed for the first two weeks of January following its decision to do so in London.
  - An anti-lockdown protest is held in Hyde Park in London; 17 people are arrested at the demonstration.
  - Police chiefs have called for police officers to be given priority for COVID vaccinations after reports that 1,300 Metropolitan Police officers are absent from work because of the virus.
- 3 January –
  - Following concerns about the safety of reopening schools, Prime Minister Boris Johnson has urged parents of primary age children to send them to school the following day if their school is open, saying there is "no doubt in my mind that schools are safe". Despite this, many primary schools have still decided to not open after the Christmas break. So far Essex Council has said that would keep schools closed at least until 6 January; Kent county Council along with Birmingham's education authorities asked the `Education Secretary to allow primaries to stay closed. They said the argument for reopening amid high infection rates “does not stack up”.
  - Johnson has also stated that tougher restrictions are "probably about to get tougher" in some parts of England as COVID-19 cases continue to increase.
  - Leader of the Opposition Sir Keir Starmer calls for a national lockdown to be announced within 24 hours in order to tackle the rising number of COVID cases.
  - Wendy Simon, the Acting Mayor of Liverpool, and other Liverpool City Council members, have called for England to go into a national lockdown in order to curb rising COVID cases in the city.
  - Garrett Emmerson, the Chief Executive of the London Ambulance Service, describes the service as being under "incredible pressure" but "coping".
  - Paediatricians have sought to reassure parents that the new strain of COVID is not more dangerous to children after a nurse based at a London hospital told the BBC that her hospital had "a while ward of children" suffering with the virus.
- 4 January
  - Most of England's primary schools are reopened, amid concerns over whether pupils should be returning under the current COVID restrictions.
  - After saying there is "no question" that tougher COVID measures will be introduced "in due course", Prime Minister Johnson makes a televised address in which he announces another lockdown for England, with rules similar to those in March 2020. People are permitted to leave home only for essential reasons, which include work, daily exercise, essential shopping and medical treatment. Schools are closed from the following day, though vulnerable children and those of key workers may still attend, and pre-school remains open, while university students will not return to campus but instead have online tuition. End of year examinations are once again cancelled. Grassroots sport is suspended, but not elite sport.
  - Dialysis patient Brian Pinker, 82, has become the first person to receive the Oxford–AstraZeneca COVID-19 vaccine.
- 5 January
  - The UK records over 60,000 positive cases of COVID in one day, the highest ever, with over 50,000 of those cases being from England.
  - Declaring that the government closed schools "with the heaviest of hearts", Cabinet Secretary Michael Gove confirms that GCSE and A Level examinations scheduled for summer 2021 have been cancelled, with grades once again based on teacher assessment. But while GCSEs and A Levels are cancelled, vocational exams such as BTECs will still go ahead.
  - Labour Leader Sir Keir Starmer calls for a "round the clock" COVID vaccination programme to tackle the rise in cases.
  - England's Chief Medical officer, Professor Chris Whitty, suggests "a few" COVID restrictions may be required in Winter 2021–22 to control the virus, particularly if people do not adhere to the government's "stay at home" message.
- 6 January
  - With the third lockdown officially under way, Boris Johnson says he cannot guarantee that all children will be back at school before the summer holidays.
  - MPs vote 524–16 in favour of the latest lockdown measures for England. Legislation for the 3rd national lockdown comes into force by putting every area in England into the tier 4 area and strengthening the restrictions.
  - Education Secretary Gavin Williamson confirms that GCSE and A Level grades for summer 2021 will be based on teachers' assessment.
  - The UK government announces seven new vaccination hubs for England, to be located in London, Newcastle, Manchester, Birmingham, Bristol, Surrey and Stevenage. They are scheduled to become operational from the following week.
- 7 January –
  - A change in government rules regarding who can attend school now permits children without laptops or room to study to attend, sparking concerns schools will be overrun with such children.
  - Nursery providers have asked the government to provide them with evidence that it is safe for them to remain open while schools and colleges are closed.
- 8 January –
  - Sadiq Kahn, the Mayor of London, declares a "major incident" in London, where he says COVID is "out of control".
  - Two UK's two headteachers' unions, the NAHT and ASCL, have expressed concern at the number of children attending school during lockdown and called for limits; school attendance is at 50% in some areas.
  - An England-wide advertising campaign launches on television, fronted by Chief Medical Officer Chris Whitty, urging people to stay at home and act as though they have COVID.
  - The Telegraph reports that GP surgeries are being offered £1,000 to cancel appointments for the second COVID inoculation so that more first inoculations can be done, and are also being given a script for dealing with angry patients.
  - With lockdown and school closures in force, it is reported that referrals for children with mental health problems have reached a record high.
- 10 January –
  - Regular rapid testing for people without COVID symptoms are to be made available throughout England in the coming week.
  - As it is reported that 130,000 letters have been sent out so far inviting people to regional vaccination hubs for a COVID vaccine, a number of people aged over 80 have questioned why they have been asked to attend venues that can be as much as a 30–45 minute drive from home when they have been asked to shield.
- 12 January –
  - Home Secretary Priti Patel urges people to "play [their] part" in following COVID rules, and says she will back the police in enforcing them.
  - A leaked memo warns that hospitals in Birmingham are "in a position of extremis" as COVID cases in the city rise, with 200 doctors set to be redeployed to the intensive care unit of the Queen Elizabeth Hospital.
  - It is reported that London's Nightingale Hospital has reopened and is taking COVID patients.
  - Downing Street has defended Prime Minister Boris Johnson for taking a seven-mile bike ride, which it says complied with COVID regulations. The trip came to light after Johnson was spotted cycling in Olympic Park.
- 13 January – In a letter to the education watchdog Ofqual, Education Secretary Gavin Williamson suggests that GCSE, AS and A Level students could be asked to sit mini-exams in order to help their teachers decide "deserved grades".
- 14 January – Ambulance and COVID vaccination services in Yorkshire are hampered by heavy snow.
- 15 January –
  - Professor Chris Whitty forecasts that hospital admissions will peak in the next seven to ten days.
  - A small number of intensive care patients with COVID-19 are moved from hospitals in London to Newcastle Upon Tyne, it is reported.
  - Police charge a 33-year-old man with fraud and common assault after he is alleged to have administered a fake COVID vaccine to a 92-year-old woman then charged her £160 in December 2020.
  - Proposals published jointly by the Department for Education and Ofqual suggest GCSE and A Level results could be published in early July in 2021 rather than August as in previous years.
- 16 January –
  - Former RAF Flight Sergeant Louis Godwin, 95, becomes the first person to receive a COVID vaccination at a vaccination centre established in Salisbury Cathedral.
- 17 January –
  - Speaking to Sky News's Sophy Ridge on Sunday, Foreign Secretary Dominic Raab says the government's target is to offer every adult their first dose of COVID vaccine by September, with some lockdown restrictions being eased by March.
  - The UK government announces a financial support package for airports in England, which is scheduled to begin by the end of January.
  - NHS England Chief Executive Sir Simon Stevens says that 140 COVID injections are being given each minute, a rate four times greater than the number of cases being detected.
  - In a letter to the UK government, a group of London-based businessmen call for financial support for the rail firm Eurostar.
  - The next phase of the COVID vaccination programme is announced, with people aged 70 and over, as well as those clinically extremely vulnerable, to begin receiving offers of vaccine over the forthcoming week.
- 18 January –
  - A further ten mass vaccination centres are opened at venues in England, including Blackburn Cathedral and St Helens Rugby Ground.
  - London is to begin trialling 24-hour vaccination centres by the end of January, it is reported.
- 19 January – Figures released by the Office for National Statistics suggest that as many as one in eight people, or 5.4 million people, had been infected with COVID by December 2020.
- 20 January –
  - The government announces that the rollout of daily mass testing in secondary schools as an alternative to self-isolation will be paused because the benefits of it are unclear following the emergence of the new variant of COVID.
  - 24-hour vaccination schemes are piloted at hospitals in Birmingham and Nottingham.
- 21 January –
  - At a Downing Street Press Conference, Home Secretary Priti Patel announces that fines of £800 for anyone attending a house party of more than 15 people will be introduced in England from the following week.
  - Education Secretary Gavin Williamson says that schools will be given two weeks notice before they return, but that he cannot say when this will be, though he hopes they will be open again before Easter.
  - Pulse oximeters, which measure the oxygen level in the body, are being rolled out to patients at high risk of COVID, in a bid to detect the silent hypoxia element of the virus. The oximeter measures the level of oxygen in the blood.
  - Boris Johnson says it is "too early" to say whether lockdown restrictions can be lifted in the spring.
- 22 January –
  - The Metropolitan Police announce the break up of a wedding party at the Yesodey Hatorah Senior Girls' School in Stamford Hill, London. After initially claiming there were 400 attendees, they later revise this figure down to 150.
  - A Downing Street spokesman has said there are no plans to give universal payments of £500 to everyone in England asked to self-isolate after the idea was suggested in a document produced by the Department of Health and Social Care.
- 24 January –
  - Police have issued £15,000 in fines after 300 people attended a rave beneath a railway arch in London.
  - Six COVID test centres across the West Midlands are temporarily closed after the area is hit by heavy snowfall.
- 25 January –
  - A number of Conservative MPs, including Robert Halfon, chair of the House of Commons Education Select Committee, have urged the government to set out its strategy for reopening schools in England as concerns grow about the impact closures are having on children's education. In response, Prime Minister Johnson says the government will give an update on when schools can reopen "as soon as we can".
  - Health Secretary Matt Hancock says there are early signs that COVID restrictions are working, but that it is "difficult to put a timeline" on when they can be lifted.
- 26 January – Fines of £200 are to be given to 31 Metropolitan Police officers who broke COVID rules by having a haircut; two officers who hired ta barber to give the haircuts are to face misconduct investigations.
- 27 January – Prime Minister Johnson tells the House of Commons it will not be possible for schools to return in England after February half-term, but that he is hopeful it can begin to happen from 8 March. A final decision will depend on meeting vaccination targets, and schools will get two weeks notice before returning.
- 29 January –
  - The Health Protection (Coronavirus, Restrictions) (All Tiers and Self-Isolation) (England) (Amendment) Regulations 2021 comes into force at 5.00pm, levying fines of £800 on anyone attending a house party with over fifteen people and allowing police to access track and trace data.
  - Education policy experts have called for schoolchildren in England to be allowed to repeat a year because of the school time they have missed during the pandemic.
- 30 January – Health bosses in Nottinghamshire have apologised after Nottingham and Nottinghamshire Clinical Commissioning Group sent out letters to critically vulnerable children inviting them for COVID vaccinations.
- 31 January – Dr Susan Hopkins, head of strategy at Public Health England, says England's lockdown should be eased "very slowly, very cautiously".

=== February 2021 ===
- 1 February –
  - NHS England confirms that every older care home resident in England has been offered a COVID vaccine.
  - Health Secretary Matt Hancock confirms that around 80,000 residents over the age of 16 in areas of Surrey, London, Kent, Hertfordshire, Southport and Walsall are to be asked to take tests for the South African COVID-19 variant after 11 cases were identified that could not be linked to travel.
- 2 February –
  - Health Secretary Matt Hancock tells the House of Commons people living in areas singled out for enhanced testing for the South African COVID variant should get tested and stay at home unless it is essential to go out. Hancock also tells Parliament that Liverpool and Bristol are also areas of interest for new variants.
  - Figures published by the Department for Education show that 1.2 million school pupils (roughly 15% of the school population) were at school on 28 January, a rise from 14% the previous week. The increase in numbers comes from primary pupils and those attending special schools.
- 3 February – Hampshire Constabulary and Sussex Police have issued a community protection notice against a 30-year-old woman prohibiting her from visiting hospitals in Hampshire and Sussex without an appointment after she filmed empty hospital corridors and posted the footage online.
- 4 February – It is reported that teaching staff in London have been able to book and receive COVID vaccinations meant for health workers after a link to the booking site was forwarded to them via WhatsApp.
- 5 February – Police in Sheffield issue £34,000 worth of fines following a student party involving 150 people at a halls of residence.
- 6 February –
  - Testing for the South African COVID variant begins in Worcestershire after cases were discovered there with no apparent link to international travel.
  - Fourteen adults are fined a collective total of more than £11,000 after attending a first birthday party, Nottinghamshire Police have confirmed.
- 7 February – Companies that employ over 50 people and whose employees cannot work from home are now eligible for lateral flow tests. The tests had previously only been available to firms with a workforce of 250 or more.
- 8 February –
  - Surge testing is to be introduced to parts of Manchester after four cases of a mutated version of the B17 strain were found in two unconnected households in the city.
  - Deputy Chief Medical Officer Jonathan Van-Tam urges people aged 70 and over who have not received a COVID-19 vaccination to contact the NHS "without delay".
  - Sir Kevan Collins, England's newly appointed Education Recovery Commissioner, says that school pupils will need extra hours of learning, sport, music and drama to make up for education missed because of the pandemic.
  - Heavy snow brings disruption to the vaccination process, with centres in the South East and East Anglia forced to close temporarily because of the adverse weather.
- 9 February –
  - Jonathan Van-Tam, England's Deputy Chief Medical Officer, warns people against booking summer holidays abroad in 2021, suggesting "the more elaborate your plans are for summer holidays... the more you are stepping into making guesses about the unknown".
  - Head teachers leaders have warned against giving school pupils longer hours and shorter holidays as a way of catching up with missed education.
- 10 February – Four councils in England – Eastbourne, Bexley, Luton and Peterborough – are being given emergency funding to balance their books, Communities Secretary Robert Jenrick announces. Jenrick says that while COVID is to blame for the financial situation of some of the councils, others are in their predicament because of "very poor management".
- 11 February –
  - Figures published by NHS England indicate that in December 2020, 224,205 people had been waiting for 12 months or longer for routine hospital treatment, the highest number since April 2008.
  - A new booking system is launched for the hotel quarantine scheme, but taken down again within minutes because of a "minor technical issue".
  - Office for National Statistics figures show that 30,296 of the 50,888 COVID patients who died in England between January and November 2020 had a disability.
- 12 February –
  - Sir Simon Stevens, the Chief Executive of NHS England, says England is on course to offer the top four priority groups their first COVID vaccine by the target date of 15 February.
  - The deadline to buy a property under the Help to Buy equity loans scheme is extended until the end of May amid concerns 16,000 sales could be at risk because of the COVID crisis.
- 13 February –
  - Prime Minister Boris Johnson says he is "optimistic" he will be able to set out "cautious" plans for reopening society later in the month.
  - Heathrow Airport says there are "significant gaps" in the hotel quarantine scheme scheduled to begin on 15 February.
  - A case of South African variant COVID is discovered in the Hampshire village of Bramley, requiring all residents over the age of 16 to participate in surge testing.
  - The leaders of the Parliamentary COVID Recovery Group have written to Prime Minister Boris Johnson urging him to lift all COVID restrictions by the end of April.
- 14 February – Foreign Secretary Dominic Raab rejects calls by the COVID Recovery Group to give a date for when restrictions will be eased.
- 15 February –
  - People aged 65–69 and those aged 16–64 classed as clinically vulnerable are invited to book their COVID vaccinations as the programme is expanded beyond the top four priority groups.
  - The Managed Quarantine Service begins: travellers entering the UK from or via "red list" countries must pay for 11 nights in a designated hotel.
  - Trade unions have expressed their concern that "patchy" financial support for people self-isolating because of COVID-19 is leaving many facing financial hardship.
  - A study conducted at the University Hospitals of Leicester NHS Trust finds a lower take up of the vaccine among ethnic minority staff, with a 70.9% take up among white staff, compared to 58.5% of South Asian staff and 36.8% of black staff.
- 16 February –
  - An extra 1.7 million people are expected to be asked to join the 2.3 million already shielding from COVID-19 after the development of a new model that looks at other factors in addition to health, such as ethnicity, weight and deprivation. At least half of these extra people are yet to receive COVID vaccinations so will be prioritised for inoculation.
  - Surge testing for the South African COVID variant is to be expanded in Surrey, Norfolk and Southampton, while testing for a mutation of the Kent variant will be expanded in Manchester.
  - West Midlands Police confirm that four passengers arriving in the UK have been fined £10,000 for failing to declare their visit to a "red list" country.
- 17 February –
  - Prime Minister Boris Johnson says England's lockdown strategy will be led by "data not dates".
  - Anne Longfield, the Children's Commissioner for England, calls for the government to focus on vulnerable children in plans to "build back better" after the pandemic.
  - A woman from Scarborough, North Yorkshire, who deliberately coughed at police officers investigating a breach of COVID rules is sentenced to four months imprisonment by the town's magistrates.
- 18 February –
  - Imperial College London's React study has indicated COVID-19 infections in England have fallen by two-thirds since January, with an 80% drop in London.
  - Data from NHS England suggests that 3 in 10 care home staff are yet to be vaccinated against COVID-19 despite being in one of the top priority groups.
  - A man in his 30s with no underlying health conditions is offered a vaccine under the extremely clinically vulnerable category after an administrative error gave him a BMI reading of 28,000. The error, made by NHS Liverpool Clinical Commissioning Group, had meant the man's height was incorrectly recorded as 6.2 cm rather than 6 ft 2in.
- 19 February – A joint statement released by the UK's teaching unions suggests it would be "reckless" to reopen all schools for pupils in England on 8 March.
- 20 February – As part of plans to ease lockdown restrictions, care home residents will be allowed one visitor indoors from 8 March. They are asked not to hug or kiss, but hand holding will be permitted, and visitors must provide a negative COVID test and wear PPE during the visit.
- 21 February – The organiser of a church group meeting that took place in a car park in Nottinghamshire is fined £10,000 by Nottinghamshire Police for breach of COVID regulations.
- 22 February –
  - Prime Minister Boris Johnson unveils a four-step plan for ending coronavirus restrictions in England by 21 June. Subject to four tests on vaccines, infection rates and new variants being met, the plan will include the following:
    - Schools and colleges will reopen on 8 March, with outdoor schools activities allowed; universities will return at a later time:
    - Outdoor gatherings of up to six people or two households will resume from 29 March, along with grassroots sports:
    - Non-essential shops, hairdressers, gyms and outdoor hospitality will resume on 12 April:
    - Two households will be able to mix indoors, with the rule of six applying to pub settings from 17 May:
    - Legal limits on social contact to be lifted by 21 June:
  - Speaking in the House of Commons, Johnson describes the plan as "cautious but irreversible" and something that will be led by "data not dates", further adding that there is "no credible route to a zero-Covid Britain nor indeed a zero-Covid world".
  - A mass testing programme is announced for all secondary schools in England, with home testing carried out twice a week.
- 24 February –
  - Education Secretary Gavin Williamson announces £700m of spending to help pupils catch up with missed study, saying that no child should have their prospects "blighted by the pandemic".
  - The organisers of the Reading and Leeds Festivals say they are "confident" the event can go ahead in 2021 following the announcement of the easing of lockdown restrictions in England.
- 25 February – The exams watchdog Ofqual confirms the results for GCSEs and A Levels whose exams are cancelled because of COVID-19 will be decided by schools using a combination of teacher assessment, coursework and exams. Exam assessments will be available if required but will not be conducted under exam conditions, while results will be published earlier in August than usual to allow time for appeals.
- 26 February – Research at Addenbrooke's Hospital in Cambridge, suggests the Pfizer–BioNTech vaccine helps to slow the spread of COVID as well as preventing illness.
- 28 February – The families of schoolchildren are to be offered two free rapid COVID tests per week under plans to reopen schools in England.

=== March 2021 ===
- 1 March – Two million people aged 60–63 begin receiving letters inviting them to book a COVID vaccination through the national booking service.
- 3 March –
  - Chancellor Rishi Sunak unveils the 2021 budget, which includes £1bn of funding for 45 areas of England to aid in their recovery from the COVID-19 pandemic.
  - Jamila Azad, a Labour Party councillor in Oxfordshire, is suspended by her party after claiming on social media to have received a COVID-19 vaccine from a private doctor. She subsequently has the party's whip withdrawn.
  - London woman Sarah Everard is murdered by police officer Wayne Couzens under the pretext of COVID regulations. Couzens is later arrested and sentenced to life in prison.
- 4 March – People living in the TS19 postcode area of Stockton-on-Tees are urged to get tested for COVID-19 after evidence of the South African variant was found there.
- 5 March – The BBC reports that some people with asthma are being refused priority vaccination status if they have not recently been to hospital.
- 6 March –
  - People aged 56–59 begin receiving letters inviting them to book a COVID-19 vaccine. Over 18 million people in England have had their first vaccine, roughly a third of the population.
  - The actor Laurence Fox announces plans to run for Mayor of London in the forthcoming election on a platform of lifting lockdown measures a month earlier than planned.
- Education Secretary Gavin Williamson tells the BBC ministers are considering introducing shorter summer holidays and longer school days to help schoolchildren catch up on missed work.
- 8 March –
  - People wishing to travel overseas are required to complete a "Declaration to Travel" document to prove they are authorised to travel.
  - Concerns are raised that secondary school pupils could be incorrectly told they have COVID after the government says that a positive test done at school can not be overridden by a better quality lab test.
  - The network of NHS Nightingale hospitals are to close from April, it is announced, with the hospitals in London and Sunderland remaining open as vaccination centres.
- 10 March – Since the return of schools in England, reports have emerged of children being asked to self-isolate following incorrect positive Rapid COVID test results which are later proven to be wrong by a PCR test giving a negative result. Parents have warned the situation is "ruining" the return to school, while experts argue children finding themselves in this situation are being unfairly punished.
- 11 March –
  - A further four cases of the Brazilian variant COVID are found in England, three in South Gloucestershire and one in Bradford. All are linked to previous cases identified in the UK.
  - Health Secretary Matt Hancock announces that homeless people and those sleeping rough will be prioritised for COVID vaccines alongside those aged between 16 and 64 with underlying health conditions.
- 12 March –
  - Students at the University of Manchester hold a vote of no confidence on Vice-Chancellor Nancy Rothwell's leadership of the university over the response to the Covid-19 pandemic; the vote passed with 89% in favour.
- 16 March – School attendance figures for the first week of the return of schools in England show attendance to be almost at pre-pandemic levels, with 95% of pupils at primary school and 89% at secondary school.
- 17 March –
  - People in England aged 50 and over are now invited to book their COVID vaccination.
  - A letter from NHS England to local health organisations warns of a "significant reduction in the weekly supply" of COVID vaccines from the end of March. Health Secretary Matt Hancock describes the correspondence as a "standard" letter, though it is reported fewer AstraZeneca vaccinations will be available than anticipated.
- 18 March – Prime Minister Boris Johnson confirms he will receive his first vaccination the following day, and urges people who are invited to get a vaccine to do so.
- 20 March – Thousands of people attend an anti-lockdown march in London, at which 33 arrests are made, mainly for breaches of COVID regulations.
- 23 March – The "steps" regulations are published to coincide with the end of the "stay at home" order on 29 March. Measures include a £5,000 fine for unapproved travel outside England.
- 24 March – Prime Minister Boris Johnson says that pubgoers could be asked to provide a vaccine certificate by landlords, but that whether to do so would be left up to individual publicans.
- 26 March – The UK government announces that shops in England will be able to apply for permission to trade from 7am to 10pm from Mondays to Saturdays when non-essential retailers reopen on 12 April.
- 27 March –
  - Addressing the Conservative Party's virtual spring forum, Prime Minister Boris Johnson has said that despite a surge of COVID cases in Europe, there is nothing the UK's data to dissuade him "from continuing along our roadmap to freedom".
  - Rapid home testing kits are to be offered to companies in England with more than 10 employees from 6 April, and where it is not possible to perform on-site testing.
- 28 March – Culture Secretary Oliver Dowden says the government's plans to ease lockdown measures are on track and the "last thing in the world" it wants is another lockdown, but that dates "could be delayed if the situation deteriorates".
- 29 March – Movement restrictions are loosened by the first phase of the "Steps" regulations, allowing two households or six people to meet outside. Weddings with up to six people are also permitted again. Prime Minister Boris Johnson urges people to be cautions as COVID remains a threat.
- 31 March – People are urged to exercise caution following two days of extremely warm weather that have coincided with the easing of lockdown restrictions in England, and resulted in people descending on parks and beaches.

=== April 2021 ===
- 1 April – UKHospitality criticises new rules in place for pubs, bars and restaurants when they reopen on 12 April that will require everybody to sign in while limiting visits to the bar to one person from each group. UKHospitality says it will place extra burdens on pubs and staff, and may discourage people from visiting hospitality venues.
- 2 April –
  - Campaigners launch legal action against the UK government over guidelines that ban care home residents over the age of 65 from taking trips outside the home.
  - Police break up a Good Friday service at Christ the King RC Church on London's Balham High Road following breaches of COVID rules, such as people not socially distancing or wearing face coverings. A video of officers addressing the congregation is posted online.
- 3 April –
  - The UK government announces that care home residents will be allowed two regular visitors indoors from 12 April, while babies and children will also be allowed. Visitors will be required to provide a negative COVID test and wear PPE during the visit.
  - The UK government confirms that a COVID passport system will be trialled at a comedy evening at Liverpool's Hot Water Comedy Club on 16 April and continue at other events through to mid-May, while a "traffic light" system will indicate the level of risk posed by different countries once foreign travel returns.
- 4 April – A 2021 FA Cup Semi-Final match on 18 April, the Carabao Cup Final on 25 April and the 2021 FA Cup Final on 15 May will all be trialled with spectators as part of plans for the return of large events, with the games attended by 4,000, 8,000 and 21,000 respectively. The matches may also be part of trials for the COVID passport scheme.
- 5 April –
  - Everybody in England is to be given access to two free rapid flow tests each week from Friday 9 April.
  - Prime Minister Boris Johnson confirms that pubs, restaurants, hairdressers, gyms and non-essential shops can reopen from Monday 12 April.
- 9 April –
  - Philippines, Pakistan, Kenya and Bangladesh are added to the "redlist" of countries from where travel to England is banned, with travellers refused entry if they have visited those countries in the preceding ten days.
  - Transport Secretary Grant Shapps says that people in England can start thinking about taking foreign holidays in summer 2021, but that the cost of COVID tests needs to be driven down.
- 11 April – Addressing the congregation of Christ the King RC Church following Sunday Mass, one of the Met Police officers who broke up a Good Friday service says that the police deeply regret the hurt caused by their actions.
- 12 April – Surge testing is implemented in south London following the discovery of a significant cluster of South African variant COVID. The outbreak is believed to stem from an individual who returned from Africa in February. The areas affected by the outbreak are still allowed to relax COVID rules.
- 13 April –
  - Rollout of the Moderna COVID vaccine begins in England.
  - The UK government says that students will be allowed to return to university campuses in England "no earlier than 17 May".
- 14 April –
  - Surge testing is extended to the Southwark and Barnet areas of London amid concerns about the South African COVID variant.
  - Care home staff in England may be required to have a COVID vaccine under new plans being considered by the UK government.
- 15 April – Figures from NHS England indicate that 4.7 million people were waiting for routine operations and procedures in February 2021, the largest waiting list numbers since records began in 2007. Of those, 388,000 had waited for more than a year, while two million operations took place through January and February 2021, while the health service was under pressure because of the pandemic.
- 18 April –
  - On the day the FA Cup semi-final between Leicester City and Southampton is held at London's Wembley Stadium as a pilot event with 4,000 spectators, it is confirmed that an outdoor gig will be held in Liverpool's Sefton Park on 2 May with near-normal conditions. 5,000 people will be allowed to attend the event without face coverings or social distancing rules, but must provide a negative COVID test beforehand.
  - NHS Providers have warned that the huge backlog of operations built up during the pandemic could take five years to clear.
  - A gig in Manchester's Platt Fields Park due to be given by rapper AJ Tracy is cancelled shortly before it is scheduled to start because of the volume of people who turn up. Its organisers are subsequently fined £10,000 for a breach of COVID restrictions.
- 23 April – Philip Hollobone, MP for Kettering tells the House of Commons there is "widespread outrage" over Northamptonshire Police's decision not to charge anyone in connection with a funeral in Kettering attended by 150 people in November 2020. A man was originally charged with breaching COVID regulations over the funeral, but the charges have since been dropped.
- 24 April – An estimated 10,000 people attend an anti-lockdown protest at London's Hyde Park; eight police officers are injured while trying to disperse protestors and five arrests are made.
- 26 April –
  - With around two thirds of people in England aged 45–49 having received their first COVID vaccine, the programme is rolled out to those aged 44, roughly another half a million people.
  - Organisers of the Tramlines Festival at Sheffield's Hillsborough Park, confirm the event will go ahead from 23–25 July, with 35,000 people expected to attend each day.
- 27 April –
  - Adults aged 42 and over are invited to book their first COVID vaccine.
  - The City of London Corporation announces plans to convert unused office space into housing in a bid to revitalise the area following the COVID crisis, with plans for 1,500 homes by 2030.
- 29 April –
  - Figures published by NHS Test and Trace show COVID COVID infection rates have fallen to their lowest in England since September 2020.
  - Sir Simon Stevens confirms he will leave the post of Chief Executive of NHS England at the end of July and become a peer in the House of Lords.
- 30 April –
  - Adults aged 40 and over are invited to book their first COVID vaccination.
  - Clubbers have gathered at a venue in Liverpool for the first nightclub event to be staged as part of trials for mass gatherings. The two-day event is expected to be attended by 6,000 ticketholders who are required to take COVID tests before and after attending, but can attend without face coverings and observing social distancing requirements.
  - Surge testing takes place in parts of east London following the discovery of two cases of South African variant COVID-19.

=== May 2021 ===
- 1 May – Government scientist Professor Sir Mark Walport urges people to be "patient" ahead of the next planned relaxation of COVID rules on 17 May.
- 2 May – Bristol's annual Grand Iftar community event is held online due to the coronavirus pandemic. The meal, which represents the breaking of fast at sunset during the Muslim holy month of Ramadan, is held in the city's Easton district and attended by 6,000 people.
- 3 May –
  - It is reported the government is planning to lift the 30 people limit at funerals from 17 May, meaning an unlimited number of mourners can attend so long as they can socially distance safely. The number permitted at weddings will rise from 15 to 30 on the same day.
  - Prime Minister Boris Johnson suggests there is a "good chance" England's 1m social distancing rule can be scrapped from 21 June.
- 4 May – Care home residents are permitted to leave their residence for low-risk trips such as walks or garden visits without the need to self-isolate for 14 days afterwards.
- 5 May – A Sheffield schoolgirl loses a High Court case to prevent her school from "requiring or encouraging" pupils to wear a face mask; she had argued that being required to wear masks risked "serious harm" to children's physical and mental health.
- 7 May – The restored shrine of St. Amphibalus at St Albans Cathedral is to include a memento of the COVID-19 pandemic with the addition of a carved figure wearing a mask; the shrine's restoration was delayed by the pandemic.
- 10 May –
  - Prime Minister Boris Johnson confirms the "single biggest step" in the relaxing of restrictions for England on 17 May, but urges people to "exercise caution and common sense". From that date indoor hospitality will reopen and people will be able to hug again.
  - Johnson also confirms that face coverings will no longer be required in secondary schools in England from 17 May.
  - England records a day without any COVID related deaths.
- 11 May –
  - The UK government confirms that from 17 May people in England who have had both COVID vaccines will be able to use the NHS app as a proof of vaccination; a paper version will also be available by calling 119.
  - A Freedom of Information request discloses that eleven Greater Manchester Police officers were fined for breaches of COVID regulations during the first twelve months of the pandemic.
- 12 May – Hospitality sector firms in the Greater Manchester town of Bolton express their concern at the easing of restrictions as the area experiences a fresh COVID surge. It has one of the highest rates of the Indian variant among its unvaccinated young population.
- 13 May – Roughly a million people in England aged 38 and 39 become eligible for their first COVID vaccine, with pregnant women directed to vaccination centres offering the Pfizer of Moderna vaccines.
- 14 May –
  - Prime Minister Boris Johnson confirms the next round of relaxation of the coronavirus restrictions in England will go ahead on 17 May, but that the increase in numbers of Indian variant COVID could pose "serious disruption" to the easing of restrictions on 21 June. He further suggests some "serious choices" may be required if the variant is found to be "significantly" more transmissible.
  - In order to help tackle the Indian variant, the gap between first and second vaccinations is narrowed to eight weeks for people in the top nine priority groups.
  - The Army is to be deployed in Bolton and Blackburn with Darwen to help with the distribution of COVID tests.
  - As the rules regarding face coverings for school pupils in England are relaxed from 17 May, pupils in the north west are advised to continue wearing them until 21 June amid concerns about Indian variant COVID.
- 16 May – Speaking on BBC One's The Andrew Marr Show, Health Secretary Matt Hancock says a local lockdown in Bolton has not been ruled out as a way of tackling the rise in cases of Indian variant COVID.
- 17 May –
  - Restrictions are relaxed allowing indoor hospitality to reopen with groups of up to six people. Bingo halls also reopen.
  - Over 6,000 vaccinations have been carried out in the Bolton area over the preceding weekend as health officials seek to control the spread of Indian variant COVID.
- 18 May – People in England aged 37 become eligible for their first COVID vaccine.
- 19 May –
  - The vaccination programme is extended to those aged 36 living in England.
  - With 2,967 cases of Indian variant COVID now confirmed in the UK, surge testing and vaccination is expanded to a further six areas – Bedford, Burnley, Hounslow, Kirklees, Leicester and North Tyneside.
- 20 May – People aged 34 and 35 are invited to book their first COVID vaccine.
- 21 May – Public Health England officials are investigating a new COVID variant which has presented 49 cases in the Yorkshire and Humber area.
- 22 May – England's vaccination programme is extended to people aged 32 and 33.
- 26 May – People in England aged 30 and 31 are invited to book their first COVID vaccine.
- 27 May –
  - Prime Minister Boris Johnson says there is nothing in the data to suggest the final lifting of restrictions in England cannot go ahead on 21 June.
  - Pupils at four schools in Kirklees, West Yorkshire are being offered surge testing amid rising cases of Indian variant COVID in the area.
  - A coroner is to determine whether the death of BBC radio presenter Lisa Shaw may have been complicated by her receiving the Oxford–AstraZeneca vaccine after she was treated for blood clots within days of having her first vaccination.
- 31 May –
  - As England's ban on evictions expires, the Joseph Rowntree Foundation warns that as many as a million people face losing their homes in the coming months; 400,000 householders have already been received, or been told they will receive, eviction notices, the charity says.
  - A pop-up vaccination centre is set up for the day at Twickenham Stadium after NHS North West London had 15,000 doses of Pfizer vaccine to spare. The centre breaks with the national convention by offering anyone over the age of 18 a walk in vaccination appointment. Demand is high and gates are closed at 6.45pm.

=== June 2021 ===
- 1 June –
  - The UK records 0 deaths from Covid-19 over a 24 hour period for the first time since March 2020
- 2 June –
  - Prime Minister Boris Johnson says there is still "nothing in the data" to suggest England's 21 June date for lifting restrictions should be delayed.
  - The UK government announces its plan to help pupils in England catch up on missed education. The scheme is allocated £1.4bn over three years, but is criticised as a "damp squib" by headteachers. Prime Minister Boris Johnson promises there will be more money to follow. Sir Kevan Collins resigns as Education Recovery Commissioner, stating the funding "falls far short of what is needed".
- 3 June – Bedford Borough Council announces that door-to-door COVID testing will begin over the coming weekend; Bedford has the fifth highest number of COVID cases in the UK with 158 cases per 100,000.
- 5 June –
  - Media outlets, including LBC, report that people aged over 40 are set to be offered their second COVID vaccination after eight weeks rather than twelve in order to help keep on track the 21 June date for relaxing restrictions.
  - Surge testing begins in Bradford amid concerns about the spread of Indian variant COVID in the area.
  - A pop-up vaccination centre is opened for the day at Belmont Health Centre in Stanmore, Harrow, offering anyone over the age of 18 the chance to have a COVID vaccine.
- 6 June – Health Secretary Matt Hancock tells Sky News that Indian variant COVID is 40% more transmissible, but confirms that two vaccine doses work just as effectively against it as previous variants. He also says the government is "absolutely open" to delaying the next round of lifting restrictions past 21 June. On the topic of care home patients, he rejects claims made by Dominic Cummings that he said they were being tested for COVID before being discharged from hospital and returned to residential homes, but that they "would" be tested once adequate capacity was in place.
- 8 June –
  - England's vaccination programme is extended to adults aged 25–29.
  - Greater Manchester and parts of Lancashire are to receive a "strengthened package of support" that includes military support and support for COVID testing in schools in order to tackle Indian variant COVID. The advice for those living in the area has also changed, with people urged to meet up outdoors and avoid travelling to different areas, though the UK government stresses this is not a local lockdown.
- 10 June – Data from NHS England shows that hospital waiting lists have exceeded five million for the first time.
- 11 June – The Association of Directors of Public Health has urged the delay of the 21 June easing of restrictions in order to "stop us going backwards". It is subsequently reported the government is considering a four week delay to the 21 June plans.
- 12 June – A pop-up COVID vaccination centre is held in Sheffield, for anyone over the age of 18, and is quickly oversubscribed, requiring health officials to ask people to stop coming.
- 14 June – Prime Minister Boris Johnson announces that England's relaxation of coronavirus restrictions planned for 21 June will be delayed by four weeks, until 19 July. The cap on wedding parties will be removed though. By then it is planned that every adult will have been offered a first COVID vaccine, with at least three quarters having been fully vaccinated. Leading figures in the live music and theatre sectors describe the delay as a "hammer blow" to their industries. The hospitality industry urge the government to provide urgent financial help for the sector.
- 15 June – People aged 23 and 24 become eligible to book their first COVID vaccination.
- 16 June –
  - The vaccine rollout opens to those aged 21 and 22 in England.
  - It is reported COVID vaccinations are to become compulsory for care home workers in England. This is subsequently confirmed by Health Secretary Matt Hancock.
- 18 June –
  - Roughly 1.5 million people aged 18, 19 and 20 become eligible for their first COVID vaccination. A total of 721,469 bookings are made during the first day of the programme being open to everyone over 18.
  - Scottish First Minister Nicola Sturgeon announces a travel ban between Scotland and parts of Greater Manchester and Salford from Monday 21 June because of rising COVID cases in the area, a move that sparks anger from Mayor of Greater Manchester Andy Burnham, who accuses the Scottish Government of "hypocrisy".
- 19 June – More pop-up vaccination centres are opened across England in a bid to offer every adult in England a first vaccine by 19 July.
- 21 June –
  - Prime Minister Boris Johnson says that things are "looking good" for the lifting of restrictions on 19 July.
  - Several hundred people celebrate the Summer solstice at Stonehenge despite official advice to avoid doing so because of COVID restrictions.
  - Three police officers are injured and fourteen people arrested at an anti-lockdown protest in Central London.
- 23 June – Education Secretary Gavin Williamson suggests GCSE and E Level exams in England are likely to face "adjustments" in 2022 to factor in time lost because of the COVID crisis.
- 25 June –
  - A study of nine pilot events collectively attended by a total of 58,000 people has found no major transmission to have occurred, with just 28 COVID cases detected.
  - A four day pop-up COVID vaccination clinic begins at Arsenal Stadium, with Arsenal F.C. offering those who attend a free behind-the-scenes tour of the stadium.
- 26 June –
  - The "Grab a Jab" initiative sees hundreds of venues, including stadiums, shopping centres and theatres, turned into temporary vaccination centres in order to increase the number of people receiving COVID vaccinations.
  - Thousands of people attend anti-lockdown protests in London.
- 28 June – Health Secretary Sajid Javid tells MPs the UK government can "see no reason to go beyond" the "target date" for lifting restrictions in England on 19 July, and that although COVID-19 cases have risen the number of related deaths have not.
- 29 June –
  - Ministers suggest the COVID control system for schools in England that sees groups of pupils required to self-isolate following a single positive test could be scrapped in the autumn in favour of daily testing.
  - A study has found the COVID death rate in Greater Manchester has been 25% higher than the rest of England throughout the pandemic.
  - Scotland's Health Secretary, Humza Yousaf, announces that the ban on non-essential travel between Scotland and the north west of England will be lifted from midnight.
- 30 June – Education Secretary Gavin Williamson says he wants to see an end to the bubble system in schools that sees whole groups of pupils sent home to self-isolate after an increase in the number of pupils unable to attend school.

=== July 2021 ===
- 1 July – Prime Minister Boris Johnson announces he will set out the final step of the roadmap for lifting restrictions in England in the next few days, and says he hopes that life will return to as close as possible to its pre-pandemic status.
- 3 July – As COVID cases rise again, the British Medical Association calls for some COVID restrictions to remain in place in England beyond 19 July.
- 6 July – England Cricket is required to name a replacement squad for its One Day International series with Pakistan after the original team have to self-isolate because of positive COVID tests among their members.
  - More than 60,000 people are allowed to attend England's Euro 2020 semi-final match with Denmark at Wembley Stadium, meaning the stadium is at 75% capacity.
- 8 July –
  - The UK government confirms that fully vaccinated UK residents arriving into England from amber list countries will no longer be required to quarantine after 19 July, but will still be required to pay for COVID tests.
  - Hospitals in Leeds postpone planned elective surgeries due to dealing with a rise in COVID cases.
  - A study by Imperial College London attributes a faster rise in COVID cases among men over the preceding two weeks to fans watching Euro 2020.
- 10 July – Ministers are reported to be considering exempting fully vaccinated NHS staff in England from having to self isolate if they are contacted by contact tracing.
- 12 July –
  - Health Secretary Sajid Javid and Prime Minister Boris Johnson confirm almost all COVID restrictions will be removed in England on 19 July.
  - Public examinations for secondary school students are to resume in 2022, with pupils likely to have advanced warning of exam topics.
- 13 July –
  - Mayor of London Sadiq Khan confirms that face coverings will continue to be mandatory on London's transport network after 19 July.
  - The House of Commons votes 319–246 to approve legislation requiring the compulsory vaccination of care home staff in England from October 2021.
  - A snapshot of school attendance figures from one day during the previous week shows that almost 1.5 million pupils were absent due to self-isolation.
- 15 July – Pavement dining and outdoor pint licensing in England is to continue for a further year to help the hospitality industry.
- 17 July –
  - Children aged between two and 16, adults aged over 50 and those in at risk groups will be offered a flu vaccine over the coming winter to help tackle both COVID and influenza.
  - The 2021 Challenge Cup Final between Castleford Tigers and St Helens is held at Wembley Stadium in front of a crowd of 45,000 spectators, half the stadium capacity.
  - Transport for London says that services on the Metropolitan line between Aldgate and Amersham have been suspended due to a staff shortage caused after they received "ping" alerts from the NHS COVID-19 app. services on the Piccadilly line and District line are also affected.
- 19 July –
  - The final stage of COVID restrictions are lifted in England, allowing nightclubs to reopen and abolishing social distancing rules, while the wearing of face coverings no longer required by law.
  - With nightclubs allowed to reopen, the UK government announces that people wishing to enter nightclubs and other venues with large gatherings will need to be fully vaccinated from the end of September 2021.
- 20 July – Official school attendance figures for England show that 1.7 million pupils (23.3%) were absent from school during the week of 12–16 July. Over a million of those absent were off school for COVID-related reasons, but only 47,000 of those had actually tested positive for the virus.
- 21 July –
  - A shortage of workers caused by the self-isolation "pingdemic" is reported to be affecting local authorities' ability to carry out refuse collections in some areas of England.
  - Data released by the Care Quality Commission shows that 39,000 of the people who died after testing positive for COVID-19 in England between 10 April 2020 and 31 March 2021 were care home residents.
  - NHS workers in England are offered a 3% pay rise "in recognition of unique impact of the pandemic" on them.
- 26 July – A survey by Public Health England indicate that 40% of adults in England gained weight during lockdown, with the average weight gain being half a stone (equivalent to 3 kg).
- 29 July – It is reported that some nightclubs in England have begun to ask clubgoers to produce an NHS COVID Pass (proof of vaccination) before being allowed entry.
- 31 July – The BBC reports that ministers are no longer planning to make full vaccination compulsory for university lecturers in England.

=== August 2021 ===
- 6 August – England’s R number is estimated to be between 0.8 and 1.1, a fall from the previous week when it was estimated to be between 1.1 and 1.4.
- 7 August – Students at the University of Sussex who are fully vaccinated are being offered the chance to win £5,000, with ten prizes on offer.
- 12 August – Figures show that a record number of people are waiting for NHS hospital treatment in England, with a total of 5.45 million on waiting lists.
- 15 August – The UK government confirms 23 August as the date by which all 16 and 17-year-olds will in England will have been offered a COVID vaccine, or the chance to book an appointment.
- 17 August – Six of the UK's teaching unions have written to Education Secretary Gavin Williamson to call for urgent action for better ventilation in schools amid concerns about a rise in COVID cases when pupils return to the classroom for the new academic year.
- 19 August – Official figures show that two areas of Newquay in Cornwall had of the highest COVID rates in England during the week ending 13 August, along with Yarborough near Grimsby in Lincolnshire.
- 24 August – As COVID cases rise in Cornwall, the county's tourist board asks people to stay away from the area unless they have pre-booked holidays.
- 25 August – Data from Public Health England indicate that the rate of COVID cases in South West England is "by far" highest among those aged 15–24.
- 26 August –
  - NHS organisations in England have been told to prepare for a possible extension of the COVID vaccination programme to 12–15-year-olds. But the Joint Committee on Vaccination and Immunisation is reported to have concerns about the effect of the COVID vaccine on other vaccines administered to young children.
  - The latest figures from Public Health England indicate COVID cases are on the rise again in most areas of England, apart from London and Yorkshire and the Humber, where they have fallen.
- 27 August –
  - Following an uptick in the number of COVID cases in the south west, Cornwall, the Isles of Scilly, Devon, Plymouth and Torbay are to receive extra help from the Department of Health and Social Care to help curb the increase. This will include mandatory face coverings for school and college students when gathering in communal areas.
  - Scientists advising the UK government believe it is "highly likely" there will be high levels of COVID in schools in England by the end of September.
- 28 August – The Royal National Lifeboat Institution says that lifeguards have been withdrawn from two beaches in Lincolnshire after one of their number tested positive for COVID.

=== September 2021 ===
- 2 September – As schools prepare to return for the new academic year and concerns mount about their potential base as a spread for COVID, Dr Yvonne Doyle, medical director of Public Health England has said schools are not "drivers" or "hubs" of COVID infection.
- 5 September – Vaccines Minister Nadhim Zahawi confirms that vaccine passports will be required for nightclubs and other indoor venues in England from the end of September.
- 6 September – The UK government confirms the NHS in England will get an extra £5.4bn over the coming six months to help deal with the backlog caused by COVID, and to help with its response to the pandemic.
- 7 September – Addressing the House of Commons, Prime Minister Boris Johnson announces a new Health and Social Care Tax worth £12bn designed to deal with the backlog caused by COVID and improve social care in England.
- 8 September – Official figures have revealed that people in the north of England were 17% more likely to die from COVID-related illnesses than those in the rest of the country.
- 9 September – Figures show that 5.6 million people were on NHS England's waiting lists in July, while the average waiting time for an ambulance during a life threatening call was eight and a half minutes in August; the target is seven minutes.
- 12 September – Speaking on BBC One's The Andrew Marr Show, Health Secretary Sajid Javid confirms plans to require proof of vaccination for nightclubs and other venues in England have been scrapped. 10 Downing Street says the plans will be kept "in reserve".
- 14 September –
  - Officials at Northern Lincolnshire and Goole NHS Foundation Trust confirm that patients at Grimsby Hospital have been forced to queue outside A&E due to "high demand for services".
  - Boris Johnson discusses plans to emphasize vaccine boosters and vaccination of children 12–15 as part of efforts for handling the autumn and winter months. Johnson left open the possibility of "plan B" measures (which would include reinstating mask mandates, and possibly mandating proof of vaccination for certain venues, bringing England in line with restrictions in the other Home Nations) in the event of another surge, aiming to avoid lockdown.
- 17 September –
  - Al fresco dining is set to continue in central London, but may not do so in Soho, it is reported.
  - Manchester United releases figures for the 2020–21 football season indicating that losses it made at the turnstiles from physical attendances at matches were offset by money made from broadcasting.
- 21 September – Staff at Cornwall's Eden Project are given a "wellbeing week" off work as a thank you for their work during the pandemic.
- 24 September –
  - England's R number falls slightly to between 0.8 and 1.0, down from 0.9 to 1.1 the previous week.
  - Some schools in Corby and Kettering in Northamptonshire have brought back face mask requirements amid rising COVID cases in the area.
- 26 September – The Great Manchester Run is held, following its cancellation in 2020 due to COVID.
- 30 September –
  - Data shows the level of face-to-face GP appointments in England has changed little since the winter lockdown, with 58% of appointments conducted in person during August 2021; this compares with 54% in January and a pre-COVID level of 80%.
  - The UK government confirms that GCSE and A Level examination grades in England will be returned to pre-COVID levels over the next two years.

=== October 2021 ===
- 1 October – The UK government confirms that GCSE and A-level grades in England will be returned to pre-pandemic levels over the next two years following unusually high grades during 2020 and 2021. Public examinations for secondary school education will be held in 2022, but the option of teacher based assessment will remain open.
- 4 October – Parents of children aged 12–15 living in Northamptonshire, where COVID cases are high, are urged to get their children vaccinated.
- 5 October –
  - Department for Education figures indicate the number of pupils absent from school in England rose by two thirds in the two weeks to 30 September, with 204,000 (2.5% of school pupils) absent due to COVID-related reasons.
  - The Vale Academy in Brigg, North Lincolnshire reintroduces bubbles due to high COVID cases in the area.
- 7 October – Schools in Cambridgeshire are asked to reintroduce compulsory face masks for pupils after health officials said that 50% of recent COVID infections have been among those aged 0–17.
- 8 October – Figures released by the Office for National Statistics for the week ending 2 October show an increase in COVID infections in English secondary schools, with one in 14 believed to have the virus, up from one in 20 the week before. Nationally the rate has risen from one in 85 to one in 70, the rise having been driven by the secondary school increase.
- 11 October – Visiting is suspended at Withybush Hospital in Haverfordwest, Pembrokeshire, after a rise in COVID cases.
- 21 October –
  - The Royal Cornwall Hospitals Trust declares a critical incident because of the pressures it is facing; the previous day saw over 100 people waiting for Accident and Emergency treatment with 25 ambulances waiting outside.
  - Greater Manchester has cancelled its eight council-run bonfires due to COVID; the events normally attract around 100,000 attendees.
- 24 October – New rules come into force allowing fully vaccinated travellers returning to England to take lateral flow tests instead of PCR tests.
- 31 October – Health officials from NHS England are to visit around 800 schools in an attempt to accelerate the vaccination programme for 12–15-year-olds; around 600,000 people in that age group have already had the vaccine.

=== November 2021 ===
- 1 November – Cambridgeshire and Peterborough councils become "enhanced response areas", with extra government support to tackle high COVID rates in the area. The support includes efforts to maximise vaccine rollout and is expected to be in place for five weeks.
- 2 November – Diwali celebrations return to Leicester following their cancellation in 2020 because of COVID.
- 4 November – Birmingham's German Christmas Market returns after its cancellation in 2020. The event is smaller than in previous years, and Birmingham City Council warns it could change or close if COVID restrictions return.
- 5 November – England's R number is estimated to be between 0.9 and 1.1, a fall from the same day the previous week when it was estimated to be between 1.1 and 1.3.
- 8 November – Doctors are expressing concern about the number of older people who have not taken up the offer of a booster vaccine, with as many as 20% of those over 80 in the North East of England and North Cumbria yet to have the booster.
- 15 November – Two men from Rotherham, South Yorkshire, who fraudulently claimed £200,000 in emergency COVID funding by setting up bogus businesses then going into voluntary liquidation are banned from being company directors for thirteen and six years respectively.
- 18 November – UK Health Security Agency data for the period up to 14 November indicates COVID cases in England are now highest among children aged 5–9.
- 22 November – People aged over 40 in England become eligible to book their COVID booster vaccination.
- 23 November – COVID advice is updated for England, where people are urged to take a lateral flow test if they expect to be in a “high risk situation” that day, such as spending time in “crowded and enclosed spaces” and where “there is limited fresh air”.
- 30 November – Rules regarding face coverings in England and PCR tests for travellers arriving into the UK come into force as a measure to offset the new Omicron COVID variant discovered in Southern Africa.
- 29 November – Secondary school pupils in England are "strongly advised" to wear face coverings in communal areas.
- 30 November –
  - Rules regarding face coverings in England and PCR tests for travellers arriving into the UK come into force.
  - Prime Minister Johnson announces that by the end of January 2022, all adults in England over the age of 18 would be eligible to receive a vaccine booster.

=== December 2021 ===
- 4 December – GP surgeries in England will be allowed to defer non-urgent health checks for over-75s in order to focus on providing the booster vaccine. The move is welcomed by doctors' leaders.
- 8 December – Prime Minister Johnson announces that "plan B" measures would be implemented due to the threat of Omicron variant and to ensure a "close to normal" holiday season:
  - From 10 December the mask mandate is extended to cinemas, theatres and similar indoor venues.
  - From 13 December employees are being advised to work from home if possible.
  - From 15 December attendees of nightclubs and large events must produce an NHS COVID Pass to enter.
- 30 December – The Welsh Government announces that Wales will lend England four million lateral flow tests to help with the current shortage of tests being experienced by England.

== See also ==
- Timeline of the COVID-19 pandemic in England (January–June 2020)
- Timeline of the COVID-19 pandemic in England (July–December 2020)
- Timeline of the COVID-19 pandemic in England (2022)
- Timeline of the COVID-19 pandemic in the United Kingdom (January–June 2021)
- Timeline of the COVID-19 pandemic in the United Kingdom (July–December 2021)
- Timeline of the COVID-19 pandemic in Scotland (2021)
- Timeline of the COVID-19 pandemic in Wales (2021)
- Timeline of the COVID-19 pandemic in Northern Ireland (2021)
- History of the COVID-19 pandemic in the United Kingdom
