= Jiangyou =

Jiangyou 江油市
- County-level city
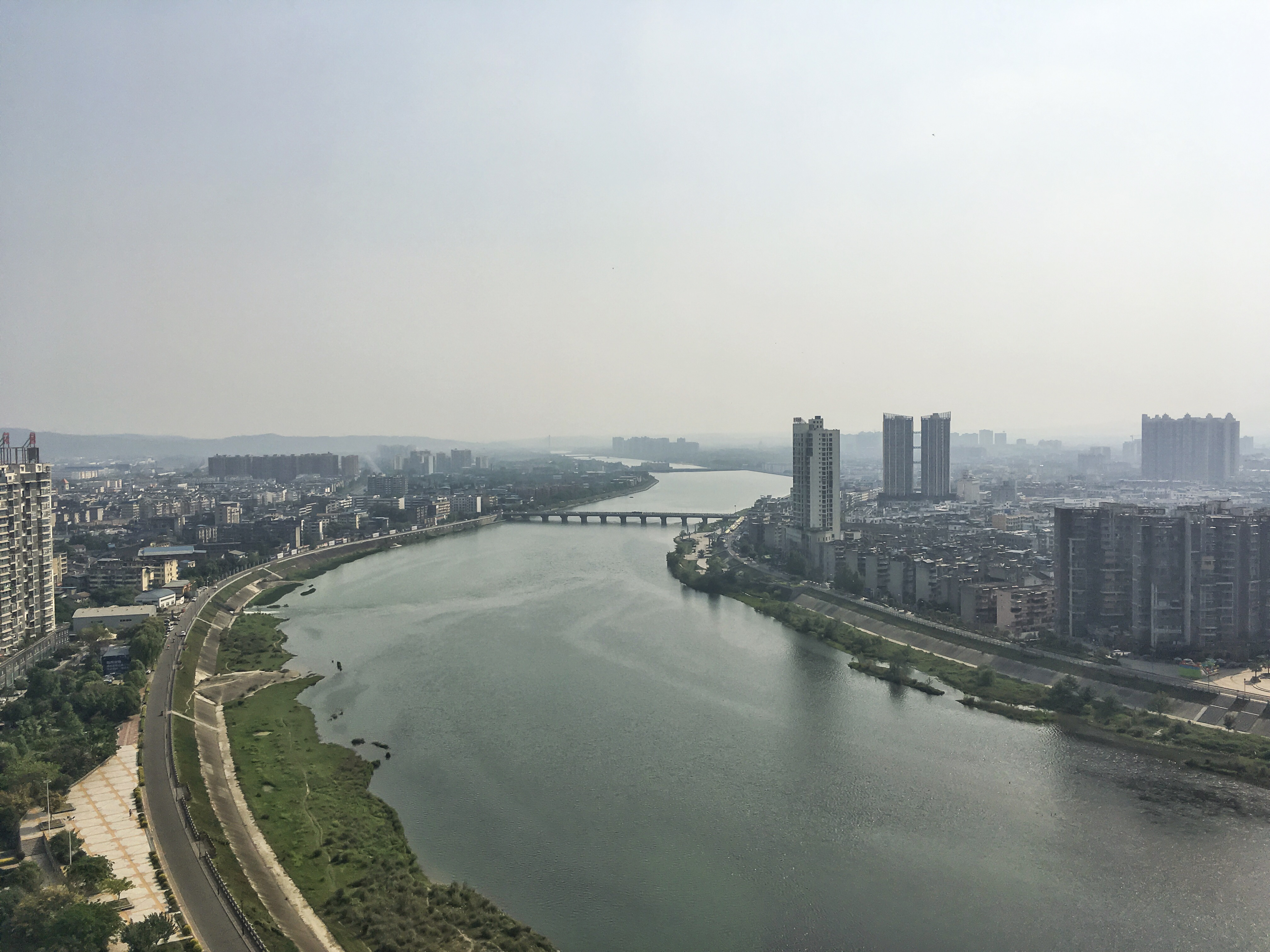

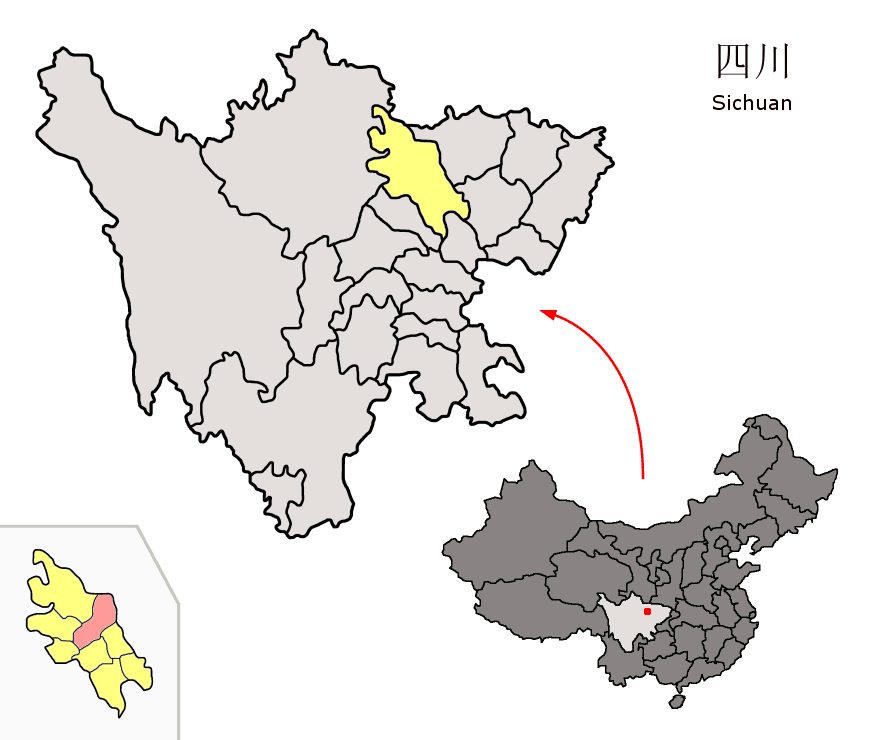
- Location of Jiangyou within Mianyang, Sichuan

- Location in Sichuan
- Coordinates: 31°46′15.6″N 104°45′18″E
- Country: China
- Province: Sichuan
- Prefecture-level city: Mianyang
- Municipal seat: Zhongba

Area
  - Total: 2,719 km^{2} (1,050 sq mi)

Population (2020 census)
  - Total: 731,343
  - Density: 269.0/km^{2} (696.6/sq mi)
- Time zone: UTC+8 (China Standard)
- Postal code: 621700
- Area code: 0816
- Website: www.jiangyou.gov.cn

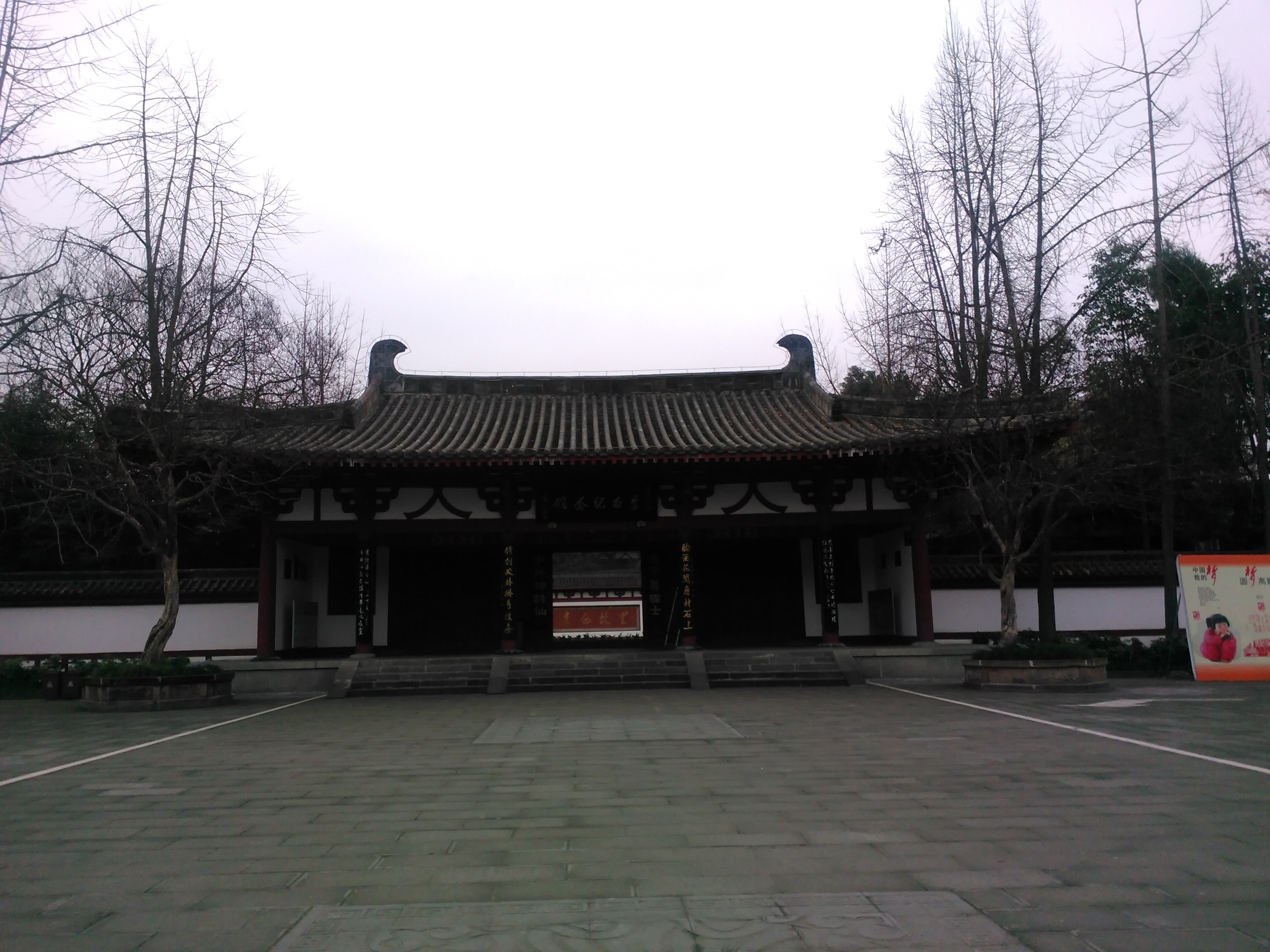
Li Bai Memorial Hall in Jiangyou

Jiangyou (Chinese: 江油; pinyin: Jiāngyóu) is a Chinese county-level city located in Mianyang, Sichuan. The city proper is subdivided into four urban districts and has jurisdiction over 21 towns, and 19 rural townships. It is the hometown of Li Bai, a leading Tang dynasty poet.

Jiangyou has an area of 2,720 km^{2} (1,050 sq mi) and a population of 731,343 in 2020.

In 2025 a bullying incident involving students in the city led to protests and drew nationwide attention.

== Administrative divisions ==
Jiangyou has 1 subdistrict, 22 towns and 1 township.

Subdistricts

- Zhongba (中坝街道)

Towns

- Taiping (太平镇)
- Sanhe (三合镇)
- Hanzeng (含增镇)
- Qinglian (青莲镇)
- Zhangming (彰明镇)
- Longfeng (龙凤镇)
- Wudu (武都镇)
- Dakang (大康镇)
- Xin'an (新安镇)
- Zhanqi (战旗镇)
- Shuanghe (双河镇)
- Yongsheng (永胜镇)
- Xiaoxiba (小溪坝镇)
- Hekou (河口镇)
- Chonghua (重华镇)
- Houba (厚坝镇)
- Erlangmiao (二郎庙镇)
- Majiao (马角镇)
- Yanmen (雁门镇)
- Xiping (西屏镇)
- Dayan (大堰镇)
- Fangshui (方水镇)
- Xiangshui (香水镇)

Townships

- Fengshun (枫顺乡)

== Climate ==
Climate data for Jiangyou, elevation 543 m (1,781 ft), (1991–2020 normals, extremes 1991–present)
Month	Jan	Feb	Mar	Apr	May	Jun	Jul	Aug	Sep	Oct	Nov	Dec	Year
Record high °C (°F)	19.8 (67.6)	22.8 (73.0)	31.5 (88.7)	33.1 (91.6)	35.5 (95.9)	38.2 (100.8)	38.2 (100.8)	39.7 (103.5)	35.2 (95.4)	30.8 (87.4)	25.9 (78.6)	21.5 (70.7)	39.7 (103.5)
Mean daily maximum °C (°F)	9.6 (49.3)	12.2 (54.0)	17.6 (63.7)	23.8 (74.8)	26.9 (80.4)	28.9 (84.0)	30.4 (86.7)	30.9 (87.6)	25.4 (77.7)	20.9 (69.6)	15.8 (60.4)	10.9 (51.6)	21.1 (70.0)
Daily mean °C (°F)	5.4 (41.7)	7.7 (45.9)	12.5 (54.5)	18.0 (64.4)	21.5 (70.7)	24.3 (75.7)	25.7 (78.3)	25.8 (78.4)	21.4 (70.5)	17.1 (62.8)	12.1 (53.8)	6.7 (44.1)	16.5 (61.7)
Mean daily minimum °C (°F)	2.3 (36.1)	4.3 (39.7)	8.6 (47.5)	13.3 (55.9)	17.2 (63.0)	20.6 (69.1)	22.2 (72.0)	22.1 (71.8)	18.8 (65.8)	14.7 (58.5)	9.6 (49.3)	3.7 (38.7)	13.1 (55.6)
Record low °C (°F)	−5.7 (21.7)	−2.5 (27.5)	−0.5 (31.1)	3.5 (38.3)	8.0 (46.4)	13.5 (56.3)	17.8 (64.0)	15.5 (59.9)	11.5 (52.7)	6.9 (44.4)	0.7 (33.3)	−4.5 (23.9)	−5.7 (21.7)
Average precipitation mm (inches)	11.0 (0.43)	12.7 (0.50)	26.4 (1.04)	50.3 (1.98)	82.8 (3.26)	120.4 (4.74)	291.8 (11.49)	241.9 (9.52)	166.5 (6.56)	57.5 (2.26)	19.3 (0.76)	6.6 (0.26)	1,087.2 (42.8)
Average precipitation days (≥ 0.1 mm)	7.0	7.1	10.0	11.8	13.0	13.9	16.0	15.6	15.6	14.6	7.9	4.9	137.4
Average snowy days	1.5	0.6	0	0	0	0	0	0	0	0	0.1	0.3	2.5
Average relative humidity (%)	78	76	73	72	69	76	80	80	82	82	81	79	77
Mean monthly sunshine hours	78.0	74.9	107.3	141.1	154.9	137.3	150.4	158.2	89.4	77.2	81.4	83.1	1,333.2
Percentage possible sunshine	24	24	29	36	36	32	35	39	24	22	26	27	30
Source: China Meteorological Administration all-time extreme temperatureall-time July High
