= Atypical pneumonia =

Pneumonia from an unusual source

- Other names: Walking pneumonia
- Specialty: Infectious disease, pulmonology

Atypical pneumonia, also known as walking pneumonia, is any type of pneumonia not caused by one of the pathogens most commonly associated with the disease. Its clinical presentation contrasts to that of "typical" pneumonia. A variety of microorganisms can cause it. When it develops independently from another disease, it is called primary atypical pneumonia (PAP).

The term was introduced in the 1930s and was contrasted with the bacterial pneumonia caused by Streptococcus pneumoniae, at that time the best known and most commonly occurring form of pneumonia. The distinction was historically considered important, as it differentiated those more likely to present with "typical" respiratory symptoms and lobar pneumonia from those more likely to present with "atypical" generalized symptoms (such as fever, headache, coughing (with or without sputum), sweating and myalgia) and bronchopneumonia.

== Signs and symptoms ==
Usually, the atypical causes also involve atypical symptoms:

- No response to common antibiotics such as sulfonamide and beta-lactams like penicillin.
- No signs and symptoms of lobar consolidation, meaning that the infection is restricted to small areas, rather than involving a whole lobe. As the disease progresses, however, the look can tend to lobar pneumonia.
- Absence of leukocytosis.
- Extrapulmonary symptoms, related to the causing organism.
- Moderate amount of sputum, or no sputum at all (i.e. non-productive).
- Lack of alveolar exudate.
- Despite general symptoms and problems with the upper respiratory tract (such as high fever, headache, a dry irritating cough followed later by a productive cough with radiographs showing consolidation), there are in general few physical signs. The patient looks better than the symptoms suggest.
- Silent hypoxia may occur and not be noticed, but will be picked up by pulse oximetry.

== Cause ==
The most common causative organisms are (often intracellular living) bacteria:

Chlamydia pneumoniae
Mild form of pneumonia with relatively mild symptoms.
Chlamydia psittaci
Causes psittacosis.
Coxiella burnetii
Causes Q fever.
Francisella tularensis
Causes tularemia.
Legionella pneumophila
Causes a severe form of pneumonia with a relatively high mortality rate, known as legionellosis or Legionnaires' disease.
Mycoplasma pneumoniae
Usually occurs in younger age groups and may be associated with neurological and systemic (e.g. rashes) symptoms. See Mycoplasma pneumonia.

Atypical pneumonia can also have a fungal, protozoan, or viral cause.
In the past, most organisms were difficult to culture. However, newer techniques aid in the definitive identification of the pathogen, which may lead to more individualized treatment plans.

=== Viral ===
Known viral causes of atypical pneumonia include respiratory syncytial virus (RSV), influenza A and B, parainfluenza, adenovirus, severe acute respiratory syndrome (SARS), Middle East respiratory syndrome (MERS), and measles.

== Diagnosis ==
Chest radiographs (X-ray photographs) often show a pulmonary infection before physical signs of atypical pneumonia are observable at all. This is occult pneumonia. In general, occult pneumonia is rather often present in patients with pneumonia and can also be caused by Streptococcus pneumoniae, as the decrease of occult pneumonia after vaccination of children with a pneumococcal vaccine suggests.

Infiltration commonly begins in the perihilar region (where the bronchus begins) and spreads in a wedge- or fan-shaped fashion toward the periphery of the lung field. The process most often involves the lower lobe but may affect any lobe or combination of lobes.

== Epidemiology ==
Mycoplasma is found more often in younger than in older people. Older people are more often infected by Legionella.

== Terminology ==
"Primary atypical pneumonia" is called primary because it develops independently of other diseases.

It is commonly known as "walking pneumonia" because its symptoms are often mild enough that one can still be up and about.

"Atypical pneumonia" is atypical in that it is caused by atypical organisms (other than Streptococcus pneumoniae, Haemophilus influenzae, and Moraxella catarrhalis). These atypical organisms include special bacteria, viruses, fungi, and protozoa. In addition, this form of pneumonia is atypical in presentation with only moderate amounts of sputum, no consolidation, only small increases in white cell counts, and no alveolar exudate.

At the time that atypical pneumonia was first described, organisms like Mycoplasma, Chlamydophila, and Legionella were not yet recognized as bacteria and instead considered viruses. Hence "atypical pneumonia" was also called "non-bacterial".

In literature the term atypical pneumonia is current, sometimes contrasted with viral pneumonia (see above) and sometimes, though incorrectly, with bacterial pneumonia. Many of the organisms causative of atypical pneumonia are unusual types of bacteria (Mycoplasma is a type of bacteria without a cell wall and Chlamydias are intracellular bacteria). As the conditions caused by the various agents have different courses and respond to different treatments, the identification of the specific causative pathogen is important.
