= Occult pneumonia =

Type of pneumonia

Occult pneumonia is a pneumonia that is not observable directly by the eye, but can only be shown indirectly, especially by radiography. Occult pneumonia can be made visible by chest X-rays.

The general symptoms cough for more than 10 days and fever for more than 3 days can indicate the presence of occult pneumonia, just as a temperature of 39 °C or higher and a high white blood cell count.

Administration of a pneumococcal vaccine decreases the incidence of occult pneumonia, which suggests that Streptococcus pneumoniae is a cause of occult pneumonia. Occult pneumonia, however, can also be the result of atypical pneumonia.

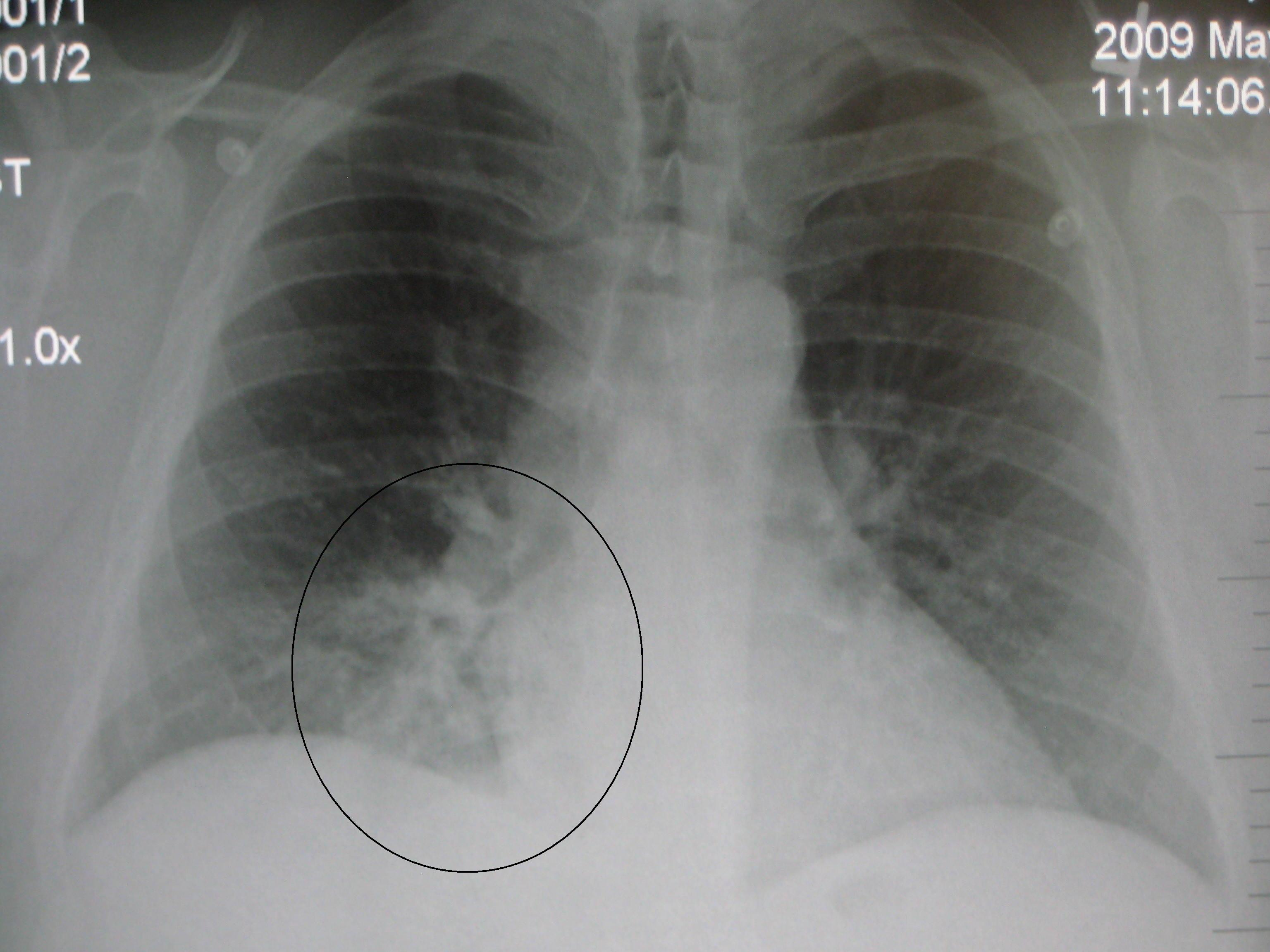
Chest x-ray, showing pneumonia in right lower lobe.

Although pneumococcal vaccination lowers the prevalence of occult pneumonia, it does not make radiographic diagnosis superfluous at patients with prolonged fever, cough or leukocytosis.

Etymology: the term is derived from the Latin occultus = hidden, secret and pneumonia = inflammation of the lungs > Greek: pneuma = wind and Indo-European: pleumon = floating, swimming.

== See also ==
- Fecal occult blood
