= Occult blood =

Occult blood may refer to:

- Fecal occult blood, blood present in the feces that is not visibly apparent
- Microhematuria, a medical condition in which urine contains small amounts of blood
