= Silent hypoxia =

Type of presentation of generalised hypoxia

- Specialty: Critical care medicine, infectious disease, pulmonology
- Risk factors: COVID-19, altitude sickness

Silent hypoxia (also known as happy hypoxia) is generalised hypoxia that does not coincide with shortness of breath. This presentation is known to be a complication of COVID-19, and is also known in walking pneumonia, altitude sickness, and rebreather diving.

== Causes ==
One theory relating to COVID-19 presentation suggests the impaired processing of severe hypoxia and resumption of normal breathing may be due to the neurological pathway by which the virus spreads from the oral cavity to the brain. It is speculated that this condition is caused by SARS-CoV-2 affecting the blood flow of the lungs' airways, in addition to the blood vessels within the lungs, which must match in order to allow proper airflow, but not affecting them enough to cause shortness of breath. It is also speculated that silent hypoxia may be caused by the formation of small blood clots within the lungs. It has been shown that the breathing rates of patients with COVID-19 gradually increase, which in turn leads to silent hypoxia. It has also been shown that COVID-19 patients experience lesser levels of shortness of breath after exercise than non-COVID-19 patients.

In healthy people this presentation can occur when the person breathes a gas which has a low oxygen content, and also a low carbon dioxide content, so there is no hypercapnic alarm response.

== Presentation ==
In COVID-19, the arterial and general tissue oxygen levels can drop without any initial warning. The chest x-ray may show diffuse pneumonia. Cases of silent hypoxia with COVID-19 have been reported for patients who did not experience shortness of breath or coughing until their oxygen levels had depressed to such a degree that they were at risk of acute respiratory distress (ARDS) and organ failure. In a New York Times opinion piece (April 20, 2020), emergency room doctor Richard Levitan reported: "A vast majority of Covid pneumonia patients I met had remarkably low oxygen saturations at triage—seemingly incompatible with life—but they were using their cellphones as we put them on monitors."

== Diagnosis ==
A tool used to diagnose silent hypoxia is the six-minute walk test, (6MWT), wherein a patient walks at a normal pace for six minutes, in order to monitor their physiological response. It has been proven that, after performing the 6MWT, COVID-19 patients were more likely to develop exercise-induced hypoxia without symptoms than non-COVID-19 patients who had idiopathic pulmonary fibrosis. The condition can also be first detected by using prehospital pulse oximetry.

== Treatment ==
Treatment depends on the cause. In some cases supplementary oxygen is needed, in severe cases artificial ventilation may be necessary. In mild cases where the cause was hypoxic breathing gas, it may only be necessary to return to a normally oxygenated environment. Underlying medical problems may require assessment and treatment.

== Prognosis ==
The prognosis for silent hypoxia in COVID-19 is generally poor, as oxygen levels in the blood can drop below 50 percent without being noticed. In cases where a healthy person was exposed to a hypoxic environment, the outcome will usually depend on the extent of associated tissue damage incurred. In mild cases a quick return to normal follows reversion to normally oxygenated breathing gas.

== Epidemiology ==
Known to be associated with:

- Altitude sickness
- Atypical pneumonia
- COVID-19
- Inert gas asphyxiation
- Occupational accidents involving asphyxiant environments
- Rebreather malfunctions
- Technical diving accidents

== See also ==
- Generalized hypoxia – Medical condition of oxygen deprivation
