= Timeline of the COVID-19 pandemic in the United Kingdom (July–December 2020) =

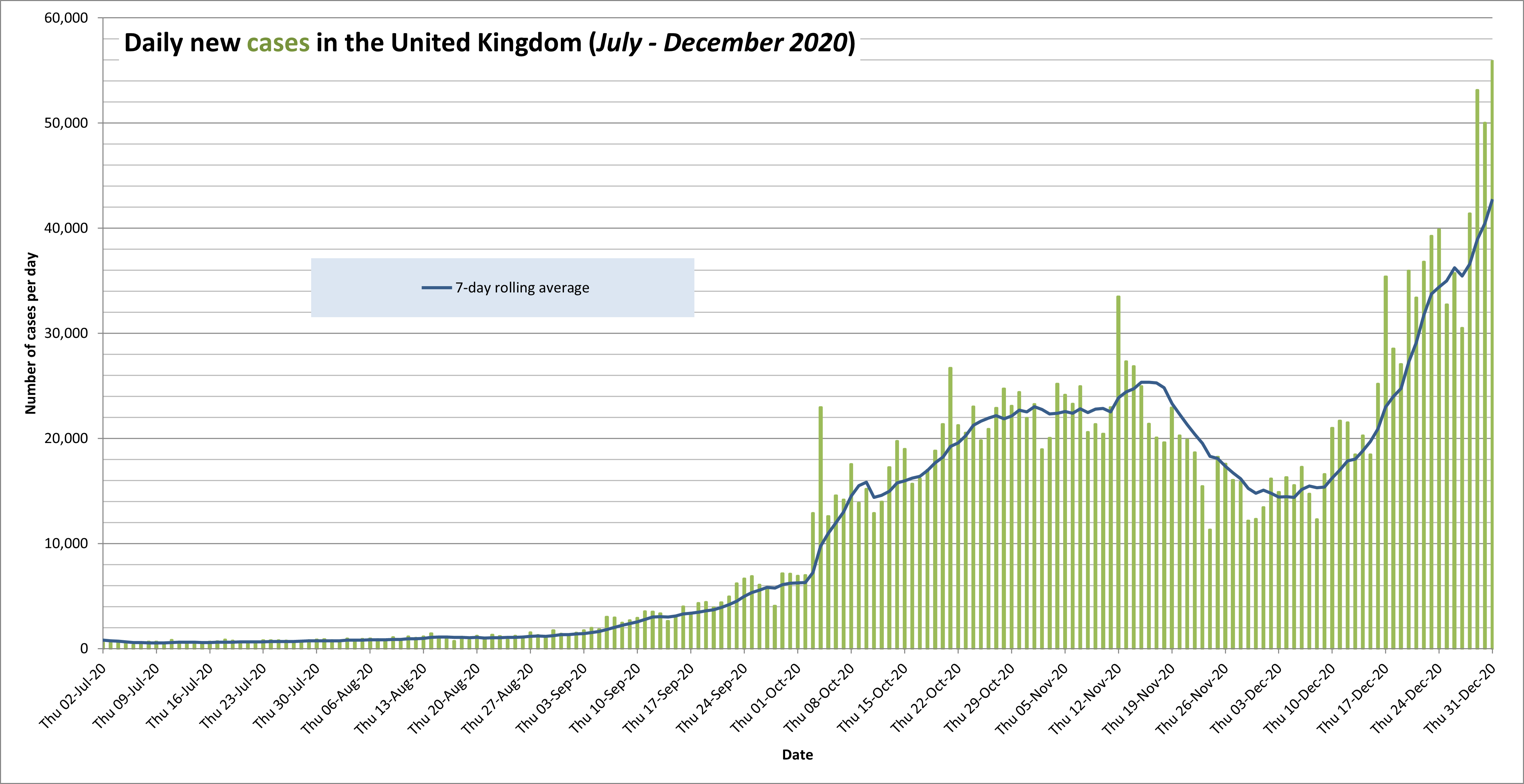
Graph of COVID-19 cases for July–December 2020 from government data

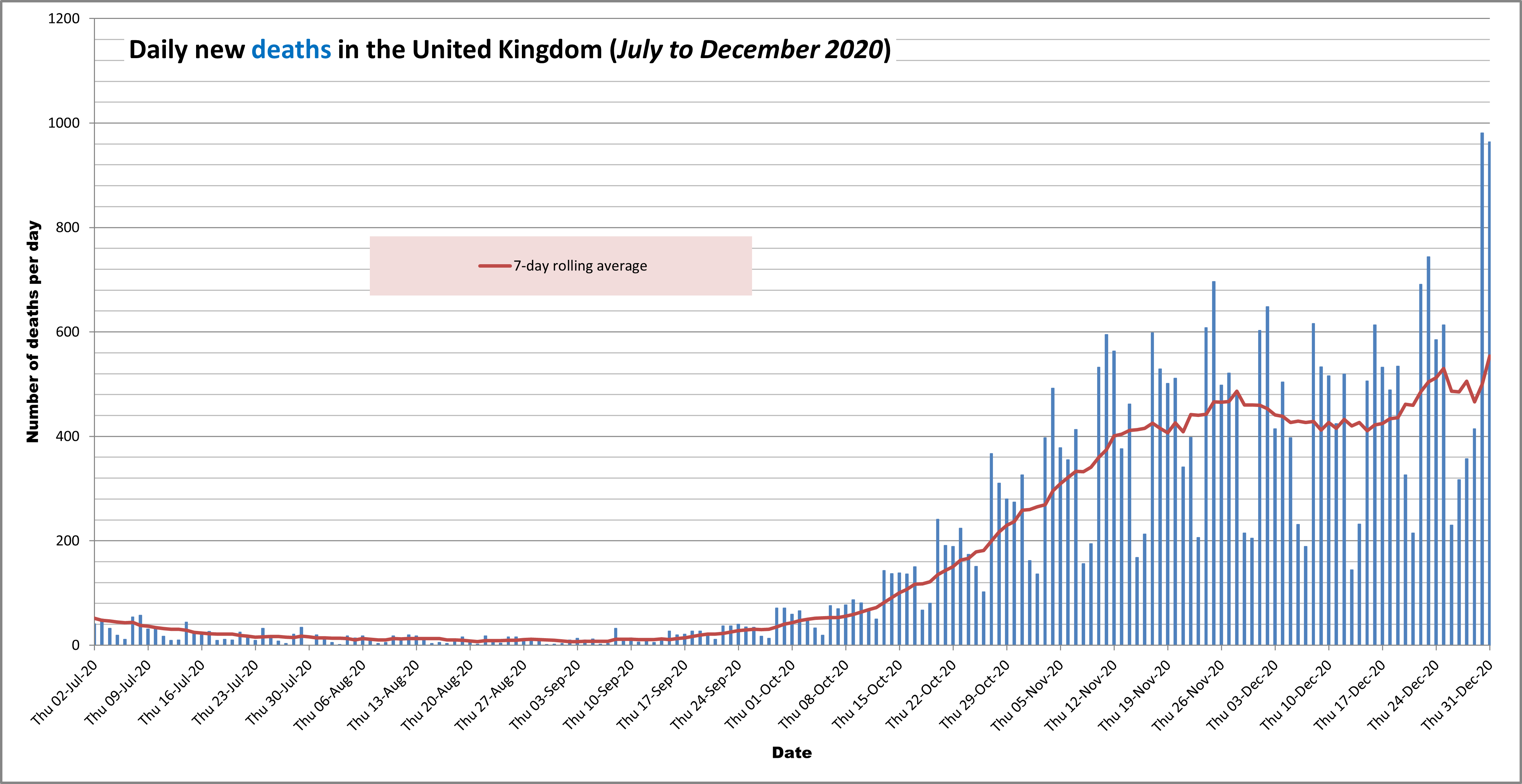
Graph of COVID-19 deaths for July–December 2020 from government data

The following is a timeline of the COVID-19 pandemic in the United Kingdom from July 2020 to December 2020.

There are significant differences in the legislation and the reporting between the countries of the UK: England, Scotland, Northern Ireland, and Wales. The numbers of cases and deaths are reported on a Government web site updated daily during the pandemic. The UK-wide COVID Symptom Study based on surveys of four million participants, endorsed by authorities in Scotland and Wales, run by health science company ZOE, and analysed by King's College London researchers, publishes daily estimates of the number of new and total current COVID-19 infections (excluding care homes) in UK regions, without restriction to only laboratory-confirmed cases.

== Timeline ==
=== July 2020 ===
==== 1 July ====
- Over two days, 12,000 job losses have been announced in the retail and aviation industry as a result of the economic impact of the COVID-19 outbreak.
- Conservative MP Giles Watling warns of the impact on theatres if they have to cancel the pantomime season; his comments come after several theatres announced plans to cancel pantomimes over the coming winter season.

==== 2 July ====
- Casual Dining Group, the owner of Café Rouge and Bella Italia, goes into administration with the loss of 1,900 of the 6,000 staff employed by the outlets, while Airbus announces the loss of 2,730 jobs at two UK factories.
- The weekly Office for National Statistics (ONS) household survey for 14–27 June estimates that new infections were occurring in England at a rate of 25,000 per week, a slight increase on their previous report. Blood samples show around 6% of people have antibodies.

==== 3 July ====
- The UK government published a list of 59 countries for which quarantine will not apply when arriving back in England as from 10 July. They include Greece, France, Belgium and Spain, but Portugal and the United States are among those not on the list. These changes do not apply to Scotland, Wales or Northern Ireland, where quarantine restrictions remain in place for all arrivals from outside the UK.
- The UK government rushed The Health Protection (COVID-19, Restrictions) (Leicester) Regulations 2020 through parliament to give police the powers to enforce lockdown restrictions in Leicester as from 4 July.

==== 4 July ====
- The Health Protection (Coronavirus, Restrictions) (No. 2) (England) Regulations 2020 came into force in England, replacing and relaxing the previous Lockdown Regulations (SI 350), and giving the Secretary of State powers to make declarations restricting access to public outdoor places. Leicester was excluded from the relaxations due to its high rate of COVID-19, with more stringent regulations in force.
- The COVID Symptom Study reports that the two-week average number of new daily cases for the two weeks to 4 July 2020 was no lower than for the previous week; rates of new COVID cases were no longer declining.
- After Brexit Party leader Nigel Farage posted a picture of himself in a pub on Twitter a fortnight after attending a rally in support of US President Donald Trump in the United States, Ed Davey, the acting leader of the Liberal Democrats, wrote to Kent Police asking them to investigate whether Farage had breached lockdown restrictions. On the same day, Prime Minister Boris Johnson's father, Stanley, had to defend a trip to Greece which critics say broke restrictions.
- Augusto Santos Silva, the foreign minister of Portugal, criticised the UK's decision to exclude his country from the list of countries from where travellers do not have to quarantine when returning to the UK as "absurd".
- The National Gallery, set to be the first museum to reopen to the public on 8 July, gave a preview to the media of its new safety measures.
- The UK held a minute's silence to remember those who had died of COVID-19.

==== 5 July ====
- The UK stages a national round of applause to mark the 72nd anniversary of the founding of the National Health Service; a Supermarine Spitfire flypast over several hospitals in the east of England also takes place to mark the occasion.

==== 6 July ====
- The UK government announces grants and loans of £1.57bn to support theatres, galleries, museums and other cultural venues affected by the COVID-19 outbreak.
- As concerns about increasing unemployment grow, the UK government announces a £111m scheme to help firms in England provide an extra 30,000 trainee places; £21m will be provided to fund similar schemes in Scotland, Wales and Northern Ireland.
- Sandwich retailer Pret a Manger announces plans to close 30 outlets with the loss of 1,000 jobs.
- The BBC's Panorama programme reports that scientific research has suggested the COVID-19 outbreak could result in several thousand extra cancer deaths due to delayed diagnosis and treatment, with estimates being between 7,000 and 35,000.
- No new deaths are reported for Wales for the most recent 24-hour period.

==== 7 July ====
- Figures from the Office for National Statistics indicate only 22% of people testing positive for COVID-19 had symptoms on the day they were tested.
- Downing Street rejects calls for Boris Johnson to issue an apology after comments the previous day that "too many care homes didn't really follow procedures" over COVID-19, but says what he was saying was that not enough was known about the virus in its early stages.
- Circus performers call on the UK government to include their industry in the arts rescue package unveiled the previous day.

==== 8 July ====
- Chancellor Rishi Sunak unveils a £30bn spending package aimed at mitigating the economic impact of the COVID-19 pandemic, including a temporary reduction in VAT for the hospitality sector, a scheme to pay firms £1,000 for each employee brought back from furlough, a scheme to get young people into employment, and a temporary rise in the stamp duty threshold.
- McDonald's resumes serving breakfast at most of its sites. The annual McDonald's Monopoly campaign is postponed to 2021 for the first time in 15 years.

==== 9 July ====
- Oliver Dowden, Secretary of State for Digital, Culture, Media and Sport, announces that gyms, indoor pools and leisure centres can reopen from 25 July.
- High street retailers Boots and John Lewis announce job losses because of the COVID-19 pandemic, with Boots cutting 4,000 positions, and John Lewis closing eight stores with the loss of 1,300 posts.
- Two sets of data are released that show the number of cases of COVID-19 are falling in England; Office for National Statistics figures estimate one in 3,900 people have the virus, down from one in 2,200 the previous week, while Public Health England figures indicate that cases fell by 25% in the week to 5 July.
- The Institute of Fiscal Studies warns that taxes will have to rise to pay off the support measures put in place by the government.
- Northern Ireland lifts quarantine regulations on arrivals from 50 countries, including France, Italy, Germany and Spain, effective from 10 July.
- The BBC confirms it will go ahead with plans to end free TV licences for over-75s from 1 August, except for those on pension credit, a measure it postponed because of the COVID-19 pandemic.

==== 10 July ====
- Quarantine rules are relaxed for people arriving into the UK from 75 countries and overseas territories.
- Figures released by the National Police Chiefs' Council show that no fines were issued in England and Wales for breach of quarantine rules during the first two weeks after their introduction, while ten people were fined for not wearing face coverings on public transport in the two weeks preceding 22 June.
- As the wearing of face coverings becomes mandatory in shops in Scotland, the UK Government considers whether to introduce the same rule for shops in England, while Prime Minister Boris Johnson is seen in public wearing one.
- Bosses at the Birmingham Repertory Theatre, one of the UK's leading production theatres, warn the theatre is at risk of losing 47 of its staff members (about 40% of its workforce), and is in danger of closing because of the economic impact of the COVID-19 pandemic.

==== 11 July ====
- Parts of The Health Protection (Coronavirus, Restrictions) (No. 2) (England) (Amendment) Regulations 2020 come into effect, allowing outdoor swimming pools and water parks to re-open. Operators of outdoor swimming pools, many of them community groups and charities, criticise the UK government's timing, citing a lack of preparation time that has made a short summer season "unviable".
- Belgium includes Leicester on its "red zone" list, meaning anyone who has recently visited the city will be required to quarantine for 14 days on arrival in Belgium.

==== 12 July ====
- High Street fashion retailer Primark says it will not take advantage of the Jobs Retention Bonus announced by Chancellor Rishi Sunak. The company placed 30,000 of its employees on furlough during the pandemic, but has since brought them all back to work, and would have been entitled to £30m under the scheme.

==== 13 July ====
- The remainder of The Health Protection (Coronavirus, Restrictions) (No. 2) (England) (Amendment) Regulations 2020 comes into effect, allowing the re-opening of nail bars and salons, tanning booths and salons, spas and beauty salons, massage parlours, tattoo parlours, and body and skin piercing services.

==== 14 July ====
- A report commissioned by the UK's chief scientific adviser, Sir Patrick Vallance, produces estimates for potential COVID-19 deaths in a deadly second wave scenario over the coming winter, with best and worst case outcomes depending on the level of action taken to control the virus. The report forecasts a figure of between 24,500 and 251,000 hospital deaths, with a peak in January and February 2021, but stresses the figures are forecasts and not predictions, and do not take factors such as the development of a vaccine into account.
- The UK government announces that the wearing of face coverings will become compulsory in shops and supermarkets in England from 24 July. Those who fail to do so will face a fine of up to £100. Health Secretary Matt Hancock says the move will "give people more confidence to shop safely and enhance protections for those who work in shops".
- Figures from the Office for National Statistics show that UK economic recovery was at 1.8% in May 2020 when compared to the previous month, a smaller amount than was expected.

==== 15 July ====
- Prime Minister Boris Johnson confirms an independent inquiry will be held into the handling of the pandemic, but says it would not be right to devote "huge amounts of official time" to an inquiry while the pandemic is ongoing.
- A temporary cut in Value-added tax worth £4bn comes into force until 12 January 2021 as a means of helping the food and hospitality industries. Nando's, Pret a Manger, KFC and McDonald's are among the firms to announce price reductions as a result.
- Online retailer ASOS says it will repay furlough cash it received from the UK government after sales increased by 10% to £1bn in the four months up to 30 June.

==== 16 July ====
- The National Cyber Security Centre accuses Russian spies of targeting organisations developing COVID-19 vaccines in the United Kingdom, United States and Canada in order to steal information relating to their work.
- Figures released by the UK government show the number of workers on UK payrolls fell by 649,000 from March to June, but unemployment did not increase as much as feared because many companies took advantage of the Coronavirus Job Retention Scheme.
- Speaking to the House of Commons Scientific Advisory Committee, the UK's Chief Medical Officer Sir Patrick Vallance says there is "absolutely no reason" to change the advice about working from home, and that it remains a "perfectly good option" for many.
- Health Secretary Matt Hancock announces that the Leicester local lockdown is to be extended. The boundaries are redrawn so that only the Leicester unitary authority plus the borough of Oadby and Wigston are now included in the travel and business restrictions, with the other areas of Leicestershire being released. Review of the situation was set for 1 August.

==== 17 July ====
- Prime Minister Boris Johnson announces a further easing of lockdown restrictions for England, with plans for a "significant return to normality" by Christmas. The new rules allow people to use public transport for non-essential journeys with immediate effect, while employers will have more discretion over their work places from 1 August. From 18 July, local authorities will have the power to enforce local shutdowns.
- Johnson announces an extra £3bn for the NHS in England to help prepare for a possible second wave of COVID-19 over the coming winter.
- Johnson announces a pilot scheme for a return to spectator sports, with a view to a full return by 1 October. The 2020 World Snooker Championship and the Glorious Goodwood Festival are among the first two sporting events to be part of the pilot. A pilot scheme is also announced for a return to indoor performances with socially distanced audiences at theatres, music and performance venues, with a view to a full return in August.
- Health Secretary Matt Hancock calls for a review of the way COVID-19 deaths are recorded in England after Public Health England confirms it records deaths as COVID related even if the death occurs several months after someone has tested positive for the virus; the other Home Nations do not record a death as COVID related if it occurs more than 28 days after a positive test.
- Rochdale introduces extra social distancing precautions to avoid full lockdown following a rise in COVID-19 cases in the area.
- Princess Beatrice marries Edoardo Mapelli Mozzi at Windsor Castle in a private ceremony attended by the Queen and close family, the wedding having been postponed from 29 May due to the COVID-19 pandemic.
- Captain Sir Tom Moore is knighted by the Queen in a ceremony at Windsor Castle.
- British Airways announces plans to retire its entire fleet of Boeing 747s four years ahead of schedule following a downturn in travel precipitated by the COVID-19 outbreak.

==== 18 July ====
- Andrei Kelin, Russia's ambassador to the UK, rejects allegations that Russian intelligence agents tried to steal COVID-19 vaccine research information.
- Local authorities in England get new powers to close shops and outdoor public spaces, and to cancel events in order to control COVID-19.

==== 19 July ====
- Prime Minister Boris Johnson tells The Sunday Telegraph he does not believe it will be necessary to impose a second nationwide lockdown in the event of a spike in COVID-19 cases, comparing the option to a "nuclear deterrent".
- Robert Buckland, the Secretary of State for Justice, announces the creation of ten temporary courts in England and Wales to deal with a backlog of legal cases brought about by the pandemic.

==== 20 July ====
- The UK has signed a deal for 90 million doses of promising vaccines being developed jointly by the pharmaceutical companies BioNtech and Pfizer, and by Valneva. This is in addition to the 100 million doses being developed by the University of Oxford and AstraZeneca.
- Preliminary results of clinical trials of a drug developed by Southampton-based biotech firm Synairgen, that uses the protein interferon beta, have shown promising signs. The treatment involves a patient inhaling the protein, produced by the body to fight viral infections, into the lungs using a nebuliser in order to encourage an immune response.
- Clinical trials of the vaccine being developed by the University of Oxford on 1,077 patients show that it appears to be safe, and trains the immune system to produce COVID-19 antibodies.
- Boris Johnson says he is confident but not "100% confident" a vaccine will be available in 2020.
- The UK Government is investing £14m in two factories at Port Talbot, South Wales, and Blackburn, Lancashire to produce a million high quality face coverings per week.
- High Street retailer Marks & Spencer announces 950 job losses as a result of the continuing economic impact from the pandemic.

==== 21 July ====
- Chancellor Rishi Sunak announces that 900,000 public sector workers, including doctors and teachers, will get an above-inflation pay rise of 3.1% in acknowledgement of the important role they have played during the pandemic.
- Health experts, including Wellcome Trust director Professor Sir Jeremy Farrar, tell the House of Commons Health Committee that even with a vaccine the UK is likely to be living with COVID-19 for many years.

==== 22 July ====
- Figures released by the Home Office reveal that a backlog of 400,000 passport applications have accumulated due to disruption caused by the COVID-19 pandemic.
- An Office for National Statistics report has concluded that a majority of children have struggled with learning at home during the lockdown.
- Fitness coach Joe Wicks presents his final online PE with Joe exercise class after leading the daily sessions for the past 18 weeks.

==== 23 July ====
- During a visit to Scotland to mark the first year of taking office as Prime Minister, Boris Johnson says that the response to the COVID-19 pandemic proves the "sheer might" and "merits of the union".
- A report published by the House of Commons Public Accounts Committee criticises the UK government for its "astonishing" failure to plan for the economic impact of the COVID-19 pandemic.
- The House of Commons Culture Select Committee criticises the government for being too slow to respond to what it describes as the "existential threat" faced by live theatre, music and other culture because of the effects of the COVID-19 pandemic.
- Vacuum cleaner manufacturer Dyson announces the loss of 900 jobs, 600 of them in the UK, as a result of the financial impact of the COVID-19 pandemic.
- Northern Ireland's Department of Health confirms the release of Northern Ireland's contact-tracing app, StopCOVID NI, for as early as 29 July. Northern Ireland is the first part of the UK to launch a contact-tracing app.

==== 24 July ====
- In an interview with BBC political editor Laura Kuenssberg, Prime Minister Boris Johnson says that the UK government did not understand the nature of COVID-19 at the beginning of the pandemic, and could have done things differently. He also says there are "open questions" about whether lockdown was implemented too late.
- Face coverings become compulsory in shops and most other enclosed public places in England.
- The list of countries from where travellers do not have to quarantine when arriving in England is updated, adding Estonia, Latvia, Slovakia, Slovenia and St Vincent and the Grenadines; travellers from Portugal must still isolate for 14 days.
- Office for National Statistics figures show that retail sales increased almost to pre-lockdown levels in June, having risen 13.9% compared to May.

==== 25 July ====
- Gyms, indoor swimming pools and leisure centres reopen.
- Public Health England warns that being obese and overweight puts people at greater risk of severe illness or death as a result of COVID-19.
- Share prices in Synairgen are reported to have increased by 540% after news of the successful interferon-beta based drug trial.
- Following a rise in COVID-19 cases in Spain, and concerns of a second wave, the UK Government confirms travellers returning to England from Spain will be required to quarantine for 14 days from 26 July.

==== 26 July ====
- Foreign Secretary Dominic Raab says it was right to act quickly, following criticism of the government's short-notice decision to reimpose quarantine rules on travellers arriving from Spain.
- The UK's largest tour operator, TUI, cancels all flights from the UK to mainland Spain until 9 August.
- Transport Secretary Grant Shapps, who flew out to Spain for a holiday the previous day, is caught by the change of quarantine rules.

==== 27 July ====
- The first confirmed case of an animal infection with SARS-CoV-2 in the UK is reported, having been detected in a pet cat.
- Analysis from the economic forecasting group the EY Item Club suggests it will take until 2024 for the UK economy to recover from the impact of COVID-19 and the lockdown.
- The UK changes its advice on travel to Spain, advising against all non-essential travel to mainland Spain, the Balearic and Canary Islands.
- Transport Secretary Grant Shapps announces plans to travel home early from a family holiday in Spain due to quarantine rules.
- Travel operator Jet2 cancels all flights to mainland Spain from 28 July to 17 August.
- The number of people having tested positive for COVID-19 in the UK passes 300,000 after a further 685 positive tests bring the total number of cases to 300,111; seven deaths are also reported, the lowest daily number since 12 March, and taking the total to 45,759.

==== 28 July ====
- Amid criticism that the decision to impose quarantine restrictions on people arriving from Spain is unjust, Prime Minister Boris Johnson defends the government's decision, saying further action will be taken if necessary.
- Johnson also warns that there are signs of a European second wave of the virus.
- The Andrew Lloyd Webber musical The Phantom of the Opera ends its 33-year run in the West End as a result of the financial impact of the COVID-19 pandemic.

==== 29 July ====
- Leading figures in the airline and travel industries are urging the UK government to end blanket quarantine rules which are impacting on their sectors, and instead to introduce regional restrictions allowing unrestricted travel to areas of a country without significant COVID-19 outbreaks.
- The UK government announces a £500m scheme to help film and television with the costs of projects delayed or abandoned because of the COVID-19 pandemic.
- The National Trust announces plans for 1,200 redundancies in order to save £100m; the organisation estimates it has lost £200m because of the COVID-19 pandemic.

==== 30 July ====
- In a bid to avoid a resurgence of COVID-19, the period for which someone testing positive for, or showing signs of, the virus is required to self-isolate is extended from seven to ten days.
- Prime Minister Boris Johnson warns the UK is "not out of the woods" as he warns of the danger of a resurgence.
- Restrictions are placed on Greater Manchester, and parts of East Lancashire and Yorkshire prohibiting separate households from meeting indoors following an "increasing rate of transmission" in those areas caused by people failing to adhere to social distancing rules. The restrictions take effect from midnight.
- Luxembourg is taken off the UK quarantine exemption list following a rise in COVID-19 cases.
- Office for National Statistics figures indicate England had the highest number of excess deaths in Europe between the end of February and mid-June, and had the second highest peak of deaths behind Spain.
- The Together campaign, which includes the NHS, charities, media groups and employers, launches a consultation on how to avoid community divisions in the months ahead. The organisation has noted that the sense of community spirit fostered during lockdown is beginning to fragment.
- Cinema chain Vue announces plans to reopen some of its venues from 7 August.
- The Office for Statistics Regulation criticises First Minister of Scotland Nicola Sturgeon for comments she made in which she claimed COVID-19 rates were five times higher in England than Scotland.
- Northern Ireland's contact tracing app StopCOVID NI is launched.
- Jet2 tells customers in the Balearic and Canary Islands to end their holidays early.
- Tui announces the closure of 166 of its high street outlets in the UK and Ireland, affecting 900 jobs.

==== 31 July ====
- Prime Minister Boris Johnson postpones some lockdown easing measures scheduled to begin in England on 1 August for two weeks amid concerns about rising COVID-19 cases. Bowling alleys and casinos will remain closed until 15 August, while wedding receptions of up to 30 people are also moved back to that date. Trials of spectator sporting events are also paused. From 8 August the wearing of face coverings in more indoor settings, such as cinemas and places of worship will become mandatory.
- The ONS household survey indicates COVID-19 cases in England are rising again, with an increase from 2,800 to 4,200 daily cases in the week of 20–26 July.
- The delayed 2020 British Academy Television Awards are held as a virtual ceremony.
- Northern Ireland pauses its shielding programme.

=== August 2020 ===
==== 1 August ====
- The shielding programme is paused for England and Scotland, but will continue for the areas where extra precautions have been introduced.
- Changes to the furlough scheme come into effect, with firms who have furloughed workers required to contribute to the Coronavirus Job Retention Scheme. They must pay National Insurance and pension contributions until the scheme ends in October.

==== 2 August ====
- A major incident is declared in Greater Manchester after rises in COVID-19 infection rates.

==== 3 August ====
- The month-long "Eat Out to Help Out" scheme begins, offering a 50% discount on meals at indoor venues, three days per week, with the remainder of the cost picked up by the government.
- Restaurants, pubs and hairdressers in Leicester are allowed to reopen as lockdown restrictions are eased in the city.

==== 4 August ====
- Scientists warn that test and trace provisions are inadequate to prevent a second wave of COVID-19 once schools reopen in September.

==== 5 August ====
- A report by the Home Affairs committee concludes that the spread of COVID-19 could have been slowed by an earlier implementation of quarantine restrictions on people arriving into the UK.
- Bank of Ireland announces plans for 1,400 job losses collectively from its UK and Ireland operations.

==== 6 August ====
- Quarantine restrictions are placed on travellers arriving into the UK from Belgium, the Bahamas and Andorra, with the new rules coming into effect from midnight in Wales, and 4am on 8 August in the rest of the UK.
- The Bank of England predicts that the economic impact of the COVID-19 pandemic will be less severe than previously thought, but the economy will take much longer than anticipated to recover.
- Organisers of the 2020 London Marathon, scheduled for 4 October, announce it is to be an elite athletes only event due to the COVID-19 pandemic, with the race taking place on a bio-secure course.

==== 7 August ====
- The R number for the UK rises to between 0.8 and 1.0, up from the previous week's number of 0.8–0.9, but is believed to be above 1.0 in three parts of England – London, the South West and the North West.
- ITV confirms that the 2020 series of its reality programme I'm a Celebrity...Get Me Out of Here! will be relocated from its usual venue in the Australian jungle to a ruined castle in the UK.

==== 8 August ====
- 750,000 COVID-19 test kits manufactured by Randox are being recalled due to safety concerns.
- The British Antarctic Survey announces it is scaling back its research operations because of the COVID-19 pandemic.
- The use of face coverings is extended to more indoor venues in England and Scotland.

==== 9 August ====
- The daily figure of confirmed new COVID-19 infections exceeds 1,000 for the first time since June, rising by 1,062 to 310,825, but it is unclear whether the rise is down to a higher infection rate or a greater volume of testing.
- Sandwich chain Pret a Manger confirms it has asked thousands of members of its staff to work fewer hours as part of its plans for post-pandemic restructuring.

==== 11 August ====
- Office for National Statistics figures reveal that the number of people in work fell by 220,000 between April and June, the largest drop in employment in a decade. Prime Minister Boris Johnson warns there is a "long, long way to go" before the economy begins to improve.
- After the Scottish Government announces upgrades for thousands of Higher results that were marked down to take account of teachers' assessments, the National Union of Students calls for the same rules to be applied to A Level results for the rest of the UK.

==== 12 August ====
- Figures show the UK economy shrunk by 20.4% between April and June when compared to the first quarter of the year, making it the largest slump on record and pushing the country into recession for the first time in eleven years. Chancellor Rishi Sunak describes the situation as "unprecedented".
- The Department for Education announces that students' GCSE and A Level results will be no lower than the results of their mock exams, with the introduction of a "triple lock" system whereby the highest grade is awarded from a choice of mock exams, teachers' assessment or exams taken during the autumn term.
- Following a review of the way COVID-19 deaths are recorded by Public Health England, the cumulative number for the UK is reduced by 5,377 from 46,706 to 41,329. England has previously been the only part of the UK to record a death as COVID-related no matter how long it occurred after a positive result, whereas the other constituent countries have a 28-day cut-off, which England will also now use.

==== 13 August ====
- A Level grades are published for England, Wales and Northern Ireland. School and college leaders call for an urgent review after 36% of results in England are lower than teachers predicted, while 3% are two grades lower.
- The Art Fund charity awards £630,000 to eighteen museums around the UK to support projects designed to reach the public during the pandemic. They include a pop-up museum in a shopping centre, actor-guides to control social distancing and exhibit boxes that can be posted to schools.
- France, the Netherlands, Monaco, Malta, Turks and Caicos, and Aruba are added to the quarantine list, requiring travellers arriving in the UK from these countries to quarantine for 14 days as of 4.00am on 15 August.

==== 14 August ====
- The UK government signs deals for 90 million doses of potential vaccines being developed by Belgian pharmaceutical company Janssen Pharmaceutica and the US biotech company Novavax.
- Extra ferries are laid on between France and the UK as thousands of holidaymakers race to return to the UK from France before quarantine restrictions begin.
- The UK records its highest daily rate of new COVID-19 cases since 14 June, with 1,441 new cases taking the total number to 316,367.

==== 15 August ====
- There is confusion as the exam regulator Ofqual publishes guidelines on the criteria constituting grounds for a review of results, then withdraws the advice pending a review.
- The Local Government Association urges parents to keep up-to-date with their children's vaccinations in order to ease pressure on the NHS.
- Some restaurants and pubs report they have dropped out of the Eat Out to Help Out scheme because of "hostility towards staff".

==== 16 August ====
- The shielding programme ends in Wales; it is the last part of the UK to end its shielding programme.

==== 17 August ====
- As many as three million self-employed people whose trade has been affected by the pandemic become eligible for a second government grant worth £6,570.
- Following controversy over A Level grades, it is confirmed that both A Level and GCSE results in England, Wales and Northern Ireland will be based on teachers' assessments.
- A study from the Institute of Fiscal Studies says that the education gap between wealthy and poor children has widened because of the COVID-19 pandemic, and quotes a headteacher who says it could take up to two years to get children back to their correct level of education.

==== 18 August ====
- Education Secretary Gavin Williamson says he is "incredibly sorry" for the distress caused to students over their grades.

==== 19 August ====
- After France makes the wearing of face coverings compulsory for most work places, Health Secretary Matt Hancock says there are no plans to do the same in the UK.
- Pearson Education delays the release of half a million BTEC qualifications, due tomorrow, in order to regrade them.
- The UK government announces plans to expand the Office for National Statistics' Infection Survey, which tests people fortnightly for COVID-19; tests will increase from 28,000 people in England to 150,000 by October.

==== 20 August ====
- Portugal is added to the quarantine exemption list, while Croatia, Austria and Trinidad and Tobago are taken off it; Scotland also removes Switzerland from its own quarantine exemption list.

==== 21 August ====
- Booking a driving test resumes in England and Wales, but the website through which bookings are made crashes due to excessive demand.
- Figures released by the Government Office for Science and the Scientific Advisory Group for Emergencies show the R number to be between 0.9 and 1.1, up from between 0.8 and 1.0 the previous week.
- STA Travel, a firm with 50 high street outlets and specialising in trips for students and young people, becomes the latest business to cease trading because of the COVID-19 pandemic.

==== 22 August ====
- Sir Mark Walpole, a member of the government's Scientific Advisory Group for Emergencies (SAGE) suggests that COVID-19 will be present "forever in some form or another", and not eliminated by vaccine as in the case of diseases such as smallpox.

==== 23 August ====
- The UK's chief medical officer, Dr Chris Whitty, says that children are more likely to be harmed by not returning to school in September than by contracting COVID-19.
- The National Education Union, the UK's largest teaching union, calls for more staff, extra teaching space and greater clarity on how to deal with a spike in COVID-19 cases in order for schools to safely reopen again.

==== 24 August ====
- As schools in Northern Ireland return for the autumn term, Prime Minister Boris Johnson releases a message to parents telling them it is "vitally important" children go back to school, with the life chances of a generation at stake.
- A University of Bristol study finds that young teenagers aged 13 and 14 experienced less anxiety during lockdown than they did in October 2019.
- Tesco announces the creation of 16,000 new jobs following an "exceptional growth" in its online business during lockdown.

==== 25 August ====
- Scientists at the University of Nottingham have identified a 75-year-old woman from Nottinghamshire who they believe to be the first person to catch COVID-19 through transmission within the UK; she tested positive on 21 February.
- Virgin Atlantic receives £1.2bn backing from its creditors to keep operating for at least another 18 months, and save 6,500 jobs.
- Figures produced by the Treasury show that the Eat Out to Help Out scheme has been used 64 million times during the first three weeks of August.

==== 26 August ====
- A BBC survey of the UK's largest employers identifies fifty that say they have no immediate plans to return all their staff to the office.
- Research carried out by the Defence Science and Technology Laboratory suggests that insect repellent that contains Citriodiol could be used to kill a strain of COVID-19 that triggers COVID-19.
- Restaurant chains, including Prezzo, Harvester and Pizza Pilgrims, announce plans to extend the Eat Out to Help Out scheme into September due to its success, saying they will fund it themselves once the government backed scheme ends.
- Prime Minister Boris Johnson blames a "mutant algorithm" for the exam grades chaos.
- Jonathan Slater, the chief civil servant at the Department of Education, is dismissed from his position over the exams controversy.

==== 27 August ====
- The number of new daily COVID cases rises by 1,522, the highest number since mid-June.
- The delayed Liberal Democrats leadership election sees Sir Ed Davey elected to lead the party.
- Switzerland, Jamaica and Czech Republic are removed from the quarantine exemption list effective from 4am on 29 August, while Cuba is added to it as a destination from where travellers will not need to quarantine.
- Sandwich chain Pret a Manger announces the loss of 3,000 jobs in a bid to save the business.
- The Royal Shakespeare Company cancels its theatre productions until 2021 because of the pandemic.
- A YouGov poll suggests support for the full-time reopening of schools in England and Wales has risen from 57% to 65% over a three-week period.

==== 28 August ====
- The UK government announces the launch of another drive to encourage people to return to their workplaces, starting in the first week of September.
- The BBC Two's current affairs programme Newsnight is given access to a SAGE document that suggests a "reasonable worst case scenario" may be to expect 85,000 COVID deaths over the coming winter.

==== 29 August ====
- The first football match with spectators takes place in Brighton, with 2,500 people allowed in to watch a pre-season friendly between Chelsea and Brighton.
- Women's football makes a return for the first time since lockdown, with a Community Shield match between Chelsea and Manchester City, the first Women's Community Shield to be held since 2008.

==== 30 August ====
- As a million students prepare to go to university, the Universities and Colleges Union urges universities in the UK to delay face-to-face lectures until after Christmas amid concerns students could spark a second wave of the COVID pandemic.
- Emily Eavis, the co-organiser of the Glastonbury Festival, says the organisers aim to stage Glastonbury 2021 in June 2021 as usual.
- A further 1,715 cases of COVID-19 are reported, bringing the total so far to 334,467, and representing the largest daily increase since mid-may. A single death brings the total number of fatalities to 41,499.
- Guernsey's Vale Earth Fair is held as usual at Vale Castle, attended by 3,500 people but with its lineup of performers being entirely from Guernsey.

==== 31 August ====
- The Eat Out to Help Out scheme comes to an end. Over 160 million meals were eaten under the scheme, at a cost to the government of about £849 million. A University of Warwick study later concluded that some areas with high scheme uptake had increased new infections after about a week and that 8% to 17% of new infection clusters could be linked to the scheme.
- Airline operator Tui launches an investigation after sixteen passengers on a flight from Zante to Cardiff subsequently test positive for COVID-19, amid claims safety measures were ignored on the flight.
- The Reading and Leeds Festivals, cancelled in 2020 because of the COVID-19 pandemic, announce plans for their 2021 festivals from 27 to 29 August 2021.

=== September 2020 ===
==== 1 September ====
- The majority of schools in England, Wales and Northern Ireland reopen for the autumn term.
- KPMG speculate that the UK economy is unlikely to reach its pre-COVID level until early 2023.
- Workers on low incomes required to self-isolate in parts of England where COVID-19 rates are high, and who cannot work from home, become entitled to a new payment scheme to top up their existing Universal Credit or Working Tax Credit claims for the duration of their isolation. The scheme will be trialled in Blackburn with Darwen, Pendle and Oldham but will roll-out to other areas with lockdown restrictions if successful.
- Companies using the UK government's furlough scheme are required to contribute towards employees' wages as the scheme draws nearer to its end.
- Manchester United footballer Marcus Rashford forms a task force with some of the UK's leading food brands aimed at reducing child food poverty.
- Amid concerns Portugal could be taken off the quarantine exemption list after COVID-19 cases there rise, IAG chief executive Willie Walsh warns that holidaymakers returning from Portugal to the UK would face "chaos and hardship" if quarantine is reimposed.

==== 2 September ====
- Chancellor Rishi Sunak attempts to reassure MPs in the Conservative Party there will not be a "horror show of tax rises with no end in sight" as the Johnson government deals with the financial impact of the COVID-19 pandemic.
- The travel operator Tui cancels all flights to the party resort of Laganas, on the Greek island of Zante from 3 September after some of its customers failed to follow COVID-19 safety regulations.

==== 3 September ====
- Baroness Dido Harding, the head of NHS Test and Trace apologises after it emerges that UK laboratories are struggling to keep up with demand for COVID tests, and some people were asked to travel several hundred miles to get tested for the virus.
- Health Secretary Matt Hancock announces £500m of funding for trials of a 20-minute COVID-19 test.
- Scotland and Wales remove Portugal from their quarantine exemption list, but the rules remain unchanged in England and Northern Ireland, leading to confusion for tourists. Although the number of cases in Portugal has passed the level at which the UK government would consider imposing quarantine restrictions, the government says several factors are taken into account when considering the situation, including the level of testing in a particular country.

==== 4 September ====
- Transport Secretary Grant Shapps acknowledges that rules regarding quarantine in the UK are "confusing" after Scotland and Wales impose quarantine regulations on travellers arriving from Portugal. In response, Prime Minister Boris Johnson says that although devolved governments are taking different decisions "overwhelmingly the UK is proceeding as one".
- Boris Johnson rules out introducing COVID-19 tests at airports after suggestions they could be used to shorten the length of time people are required to quarantine, saying they give a "false sense of security".
- Virgin Atlantic announces the loss of another 1,150 jobs as part of its rescue package.

==== 5 September ====
- Leading epidemiologist Dame Anne Johnson warns the UK faces a "critical moment" in the COVID-19 pandemic, as students prepare to return to universities and cases rise among younger people.
- Scientists warn that the main test used to detect COVID-19 may be wrongly producing a positive result because of fragments of dead material from previous infections.
- In a letter sent to the heads of government departments, the UK government has urged them to get civil servants back to their office desks as soon as possible.
- Dr Dominic Pimenta, who resigned in protest over Dominic Cummings' trip to Durham, pledges to donate the royalties from a book he has written about his experiences with COVID-19 to NHS charities.
- The disability charity Scope expresses its concern that many people with disabilities are being "pushed out" of the post-lockdown world because of anxiety about leaving their homes.

==== 6 September ====
- Sir Lindsay Hoyle, the Speaker of the House of Commons, tells Times Radio he has spoken to the UK government and the NHS about the possibility of daily COVID-19 tests for MPs that may allow them to safely fill the House of Commons chamber, but says he would not "compromise health and safety".
- A further 2,988 COVID-19 cases are reported in 24 hours in the UK, the highest number since 22 May. Health Secretary Matt Hancock says he is "concerned" about a rise in cases "predominantly among young people".

==== 7 September ====
- With a third of COVID-19 cases over the preceding week being among those aged 20–29, Health Secretary Matt Hancock warns younger people they risk causing a second wave of the virus if they do not adhere to social distancing rules.
- A further 2,948 new cases of COVID-19 are recorded, along with three deaths.
- The UK government announces the introduction of island travel corridors in place of country-wide quarantine rules. Seven Greek islands are taken off the quarantine exemption list for travellers arriving to England, but Greece remains a quarantine free destination.
- Hollyoaks and EastEnders return to screens after their break.

==== 8 September ====
- Health Secretary Matt Hancock tells the House of Commons the "sharp rise" in COVID-19 cases is "concerning", and a sign that the virus "remains a threat". He urges people to adhere to social distancing measures. Later that day, the government announces that social gatherings of more than six people will be banned in England from Monday 14 September.
- Jonathan Van Tam, England's deputy chief medical officer, says the jump in daily cases is of "great concern".
- The UK records a further 2,460 new COVID-19 cases, and 30 deaths.
- The Royal College of GPs calls for the establishment of a network of clinics to support people who are chronically ill for several months with COVID-19 symptoms.
- In an interview with ITV News political editor Robert Peston, Professor John Edmunds of the Scientific Advisory Group for Emergencies (SAGE), warns that COVID-19 cases are "increasing exponentially".
- Composer Andrew Lloyd Webber warns that the arts are at the "point of no return" because of the impact of the COVID-19 pandemic.
- Supermarket chain Morrisons announce plans to convert thousands of temporary jobs into permanent ones in order to expand its online operations during the pandemic; Iceland says it has also hired thousands of new workers.

==== 9 September ====
- Trials for a COVID-19 vaccine being developed by AstraZeneca and the University of Oxford are paused after a participant in the UK suffers an adverse reaction.
- New rules regarding social gatherings in England from 14 September are outlined by Prime Minister Boris Johnson in a government press conference, alongside details of new legal requirements for data gathering on behalf of venues, social distancing "martials" to enforce restrictions, and a "moonshot" plan to further control the virus with greatly expanded mass virus testing. The announcement on mass testing quickly attracts scrutiny from scientists and health experts, who voice their doubt as to whether testing several million people daily with a quick turnaround is achievable with existing laboratory capacity.

==== 10 September ====
- Health Secretary Matt Hancock praised Belgium's effort to suppress the virus as he "sought to justify strict new" regulations on this basis. He modelled UK restrictions, such as the new "rule of six", on the Sophie Wilmes experiment.
- Sister Bliss from the dance act Faithless voices her concern that UK nightclubs are being "left to rot in a corner" because of lack of support for the sector.
- Captain Sir Tom Moore carries out his first duty as an honorary colonel, with an inspection of junior soldiers at a graduation ceremony at Harrogate's Army Foundation College.
- A paper published by the Scientific Advisory Group for Emergencies suggests Operation Moonshot could lead to 41 per cent of the UK population having to self-isolate needlessly within six months due to the generation of false positives, and warns of potential school closures and workers' losing their wages through incorrect test results.
- The All Party Parliamentary Group on Sexual and Reproductive Health warns that the pandemic has made a "difficult situation even worse" with regard to women obtaining contraception services.

==== 11 September ====
- The R number is raised to between 1.0 and 1.2 for the first time since March.
- A launch date of 24 September is confirmed for an NHS contact-tracing app covering England and Wales, which will rely on users to scan a QR Code whenever they visit hospitality businesses.

==== 12 September ====
- The Police Federation warns the UK against enjoying a "party weekend" ahead of new restrictions on socialising.
- The joint AstraZeneca–Oxford University vaccine project is resumed after it was deemed safe to continue.
- Former chief scientific adviser Sir Mark Walport warns that the UK is "on the edge of losing control" of COVID-19 as recorded cases exceed 3,000 for the second day in a row.

==== 13 September ====
- Nearly 17,000 people from 57 countries take part in a virtual Great North Run after the official event was cancelled.
- Food outlets, including Deliveroo, write to the government requesting an extension to the moratorium on commercial evictions for non-payment of rent, which is due to end on 30 September.

==== 14 September ====
- The Health Protection (Coronavirus, Restrictions) (No. 2) (England) (Amendment) (No. 4) Regulations 2020 come into force at 12.01 a.m. Unless one of the exceptions applies, the statutory instrument provides authority to limit the number of persons in a gathering to no more than six; hence the rule of six. Equivalent rules also begin in Wales and Scotland with some differences including exemptions for children beneath the ages of 11 and 12 respectively.
- Kit Malthouse, the Minister for Crime and Policing, suggests people should report their neighbours to the authorities for any breach of the "rule of six" restrictions.
- The Labour Party confirms that their leader, Sir Keir Starmer, is self-isolating after a member of his household "showed possible symptoms of COVID-19".
- A new laboratory-made COVID-19 antibody treatment using monoclonal antibodies is to be trialled in UK hospitals, with 2,000 patients initially receiving the treatment.
- Chief scientific adviser Sir Patrick Vallance says that he was rebuked by officials for favouring a lockdown early on in the pandemic.

==== 15 September ====
- Unemployment figures show that UK unemployment rose to 4.1% in the three months to July, up from 3.9% on the previous quarter. Chancellor Rishi Sunak says looking for new ways to protect jobs is his "number one priority" while Labour calls for the furlough scheme to be extended.
- Home Secretary Priti Patel suggests that families stopping to talk to each other in the street would be in breach of the "rule of six" law.
- Office for National Statistics figures show that weekly COVID-19 related deaths in England and Wales fell below 100 for the first time since March during the week ending 28 August, with 78 deaths registered that week; the drop is partly due to the August Bank Holiday weekend, over which fewer deaths were registered.

==== 16 September ====
- Appearing before a committee of MPs, Prime Minister Boris Johnson says that a second national lockdown would have "disastrous" financial consequences for the UK, and that the government is doing "everything in our power" to avoid that scenario.
- Following an investigation by the Competition Commission, travel operator Tui says it will clear a backlog of refunds by the end of September.
- Figures reveal that the UK's inflation rate fell to 0.2% in August, from 1% in July. The fall is partly due to cheaper restaurant meals through the Eat Out to Help Out scheme, which saw prices rise at their slowest rate in five years.
- Álex Cruz, CEO of British Airways says a "fire and rehire" scheme to move cabin crew onto inferior contracts as part of cost-cutting measures is "off the table". His comments come after criticism from unions and MPs.

==== 17 September ====
- Baroness Dido Harding, the chief executive of NHS Test and Trace tells a committee of MPs that demand for COVID-19 testing is "significantly outstripping the capacity we have", but that she is "very confident" daily testing capacity can be raised to 500,000 by the end of October.
- John Lewis & Partners announces it won't pay its staff a bonus for the first time since 1953, having been financially affected by the lockdown closures; the firm posted a pre-tax loss of £635m for the first six months of 2020.
- The Office for National Statistics reports that 62% of workers travelled to work during the previous week.

==== 18 September ====
- The R number rises to between 1.1 and 1.4 as government scientists warn the virus is widespread across the country and there are "far worse things to come".
- Prime Minister Boris Johnson says a second wave of COVID-19 infections is coming to the UK, and that he doesn't "want to go into bigger lockdown measures", but further restrictions with regard to social distancing may be necessary.
- A study by Imperial College London of a "lab-on-a-chip" device shows it can give an accurate COVID-19 result in 90 minutes; the device is already being used by eight NHS hospitals.
- Office for National Statistics figures show that retail sales are 4% higher than in March, largely because of an increase in sales of DIY and household goods, but sales of clothes have dropped.
- Sir Van Morrison releases three lockdown protest songs, in which he accuses the government of "taking our freedom".
- Animal welfare charities are warning of the dangers of puppy farming, smuggling and dog theft after the price of puppies rose on average to £1,900 during the COVID-19 pandemic.
- London cancels the annual New Year's Eve fireworks display.

==== 19 September ====
- Nicola Sturgeon, Mark Drakeford and Arlene Foster, the respective first ministers of Scotland, Wales and Northern Ireland, call for "urgent" government intervention from the UK government to help the aerospace sector, which is struggling because of the impact of the COVID-19 pandemic on the aviation industry.
- The UK government announces the levy of a fine of up to £10,000 for people in England who refuse to self-isolate. The new law, enforceable from 28 September, will apply to anyone testing positive for COVID-19, or a person ordered to self-isolate through contact-tracing. A one-off £500 payment can be given to the less well-off, while fines for employers who penalise employees for self-isolating will also be introduced.
- Robert Dingwall, Professor of Sociology at Nottingham Trent University, suggests there is growing public support for a complete re-evaluation of the government's strategy for dealing with COVID-19 as scientific knowledge of the virus develops.

==== 20 September ====
- The Sunday Telegraph reports that Sir Graham Brady, chairman of the 1922 Committee of backbench Conservative MPs, plans to amend the legislation that gives ministers emergency powers during the COVID-19 pandemic. The Coronavirus Act 2020, due for its six-month review later in the month, comes up for renewal against a backdrop of frustration among backbench MPs over the government's handling of the pandemic. The Telegraph report suggests the amendment would require a Parliamentary vote each time new emergency powers are used, or fresh restrictions are introduced.
- It is reported that 1,000 jobs at Butlins are at risk when the furlough scheme comes to an end.
- Westminster Abbey holds a service to mark the 80th anniversary of the Battle of Britain, the first service to be held there since March, although with greatly reduced attendance.

==== 21 September ====
- At a Downing Street press conference, Dr Patrick Vallance, the UK government's chief scientific adviser, says that there could be as many as 50,000 COVID-19 cases per day by mid-October if no further action is taken, and this "would be expected to lead to about 200 deaths per day".
- The UK COVID-19 alert level is upgraded to level 4, meaning transmission is "high or rising exponentially".
- The government scraps rail franchising, and announces plans to extend financial support for rail companies by another 18 months; passenger numbers have increased since the beginning of the pandemic, but are still less than half their pre-pandemic volume.
- Anneliese Dodds, the Shadow Chancellor, accuses the government of misspending billions of pounds in response to the pandemic.
- Sir Graham Brady tells the BBC that ministers have "got into the habit of ruling by decree" and warns that public opinion is "moving", and that parliament must therefore approve any further COVID-19 restrictions.
- The FTSE 100 share index falls by more than 3% amid concerns a fresh wave of COVID-19 cases will impinge upon the economy, with shares in airlines, travel firms, hotel groups and pubs contributing to the fall.

==== 22 September ====
- Prime Minister Boris Johnson tells the House of Commons the United Kingdom has reached "a perilous turning point" as he announces new restrictions for England that could last for as long as six months. These include a requirement that all shop staff wear face coverings, and a limit on weddings to fifteen people. Initial fines for rule breaking are increased from £100 to £200. Similar measures are announced for other parts of the UK by the leaders of the devolved governments.
- In a televised address to the nation, Johnson calls for people to exercise resolve and discipline to combat the virus, but warns further measures may be required if they do not adhere to the restrictions.
- Andrew Bailey, the Governor of the Bank of England, calls on the government to "stop and rethink" the furlough scheme, which is scheduled to finish at the end of October.

==== 23 September ====
- 6,178 new COVID-19 cases are recorded, the highest daily number recorded since 1 May.
- The UK government scraps plans for an Autumn budget because of the COVID-19 pandemic.
- Chancellor Rishi Sunak announces he will make a statement to the House of Commons the following day on what happens after the furlough scheme finishes after the UK government comes under mounting pressure from opposition politicians to decide on a replacement.
- The UK government confirms that food outlets without an alcohol licence, such as McDonald's and Pret a Manger will not need to serve customers at tables.
- Sir John Stevens, a former Commissioner of the Metropolitan Police expresses concern at plans for military involvement in the enforcement of COVID-19 restrictions, describing it as "tantamount to martial law" and "dangerous".
- Supermarket retailer Asda announces it will introduce tougher measures to enforce the wearing of face coverings by its customers.

==== 24 September ====
- New regulations (SI 1029) come into force, in part, at 5 am in England, prohibiting certain ′restricted businesses′ and ′restricted services′ from carrying on that business or providing that service between the hours of 22:00 and 05:00. The regulations affect a wide range of establishments, including restaurants, bars, public houses, social clubs, casinos, bingo halls, bowling alleys, cinemas, theatres, concert halls, amusement arcades, funfairs (indoors or outdoors), theme parks and adventure parks. The protected area of Bolton is excluded from the scope of this legislation as additional restrictions apply.
- The second version of the NHS contact-tracing app is made available for download by everyone aged 16 or over in England and Wales.
- In a statement to the House of Commons, Chancellor Rishi Sunak announces the Job Support Scheme as a replacement to the furlough scheme, beginning on 1 November. Under the scheme, people who work reduced hours will receive government help to top up their wages to two-thirds of their full pay. The Chancellor also announces extension (at a reduced level) of help for self-employed people, longer repayment periods for business loans, and an extension to the temporary reduction in VAT for hospitality and tourism companies.
- The UK records a further 6,634 cases, the largest daily increase since mass testing began.
- Denmark, Slovakia, Iceland and Curaçao are removed from the quarantine exemption list, requiring travellers arriving from there after 4:00am on 26 September to self-isolate for two weeks; no countries are added to the exemption list.
- The Telegraph reports that more than 40 backbench Conservative MPs have backed the Brady Amendment, requiring the UK Government to seek a parliamentary vote for any further lockdown restrictions.
- The Financial Times reports that the UK could be the first country in the world to conduct "challenge trials", in which healthy people are infected with COVID-19 to test possible vaccines, with London suggested as a possible area where this could happen.

==== 25 September ====
- The R number rises from 1.1–1.4 to 1.2–1.5.
- Trials by Novavax of a COVID-19 vaccine that trains the immune system to produce antibodies begin in the UK with 10,000 participants expected to take part.
- Senior Conservative MP and former minister Caroline Nokes urges the government to provide more support for women dealing with the economic effects of the COVID-19 pandemic.
- Jo Grady of the University and College Union voices concern that students are being used as scapegoats for COVID-19 outbreaks, and says this should not happen.
- 1,700 students at Manchester Metropolitan University student halls were told to isolate for 14 days after 127 students tested positive.
- Figures from British Transport Police indicate that of the 14,726 people stopped for not wearing face coverings on trains between 15 July and 15 August, 14 were issued with a fixed penalty notice, fewer than 0.1%.

==== 26 September ====
- The consumer group Which? estimates that shoppers have lost as much as £100m in unused vouchers because of lockdown.
- A glitch with the NHS COVID-19 app that left users unable to input the results of a negative test if the test was not booked through the app has been fixed, the Department of Health and Social Care confirms. A spokeswoman for the department says that "everyone who receives a positive test result can log their result on the app".
- Thousands of protesters gather in Trafalgar Square, London for an anti-COVID restrictions protest, but the demonstration is closed down by police because those present do not comply with social distancing regulations.
- Mark Drakeford, the First Minister of Wales, criticises Prime Minister Boris Johnson for not meeting regularly enough with the UK's devolved leaders over the COVID-19 pandemic.
- With as many as 3,000 students locked down in their accommodation around the UK, Robert Halfon, chairman of the House of Commons Education Select Committee, urges the UK government to update their guidance for students, and to reassure students and their families. He also describes the situation of having students in lockdown for Christmas as something that would cause "huge anguish".
- Prime Minister Boris Johnson pledges £500m to a global vaccine sharing scheme. The COVAX aims to give poor countries access to a COVID-19 vaccine.

==== 27 September ====
- The Labour Party urges the government to pause the return of university students as thousands self-isolate due to COVID-19 outbreaks, but the return is defended by Culture Secretary Oliver Dowden, who says clear guidelines are in place for universities.
- David Lammy, the Shadow Secretary of State for Justice, expresses concern that 10pm pub curfews have led to drinkers continuing to socialise afterwards, with them "hanging around towns" and "potentially spreading the virus".
- Lammy says that Labour are "very sympathetic" to a bid by backbench Conservatives for greater parliamentary scrutiny of COVID-19 rules.

==== 28 September ====
- The remainder of regulations (SI 1029) come into force in England, reducing the maximum number who can attend weddings and civil partnership ceremonies and any associated receptions from 30 to 15.
- Increased fines come into force for those who fail to self-isolate following receipt of a positive COVID-19 test, with fines of up to £10,000 for those failing to comply.
- COVID-19 cases have so far been confirmed at 40 universities around the UK. Health Minister Helen Whately describes the situation as "really tough" for students, but says outbreaks must be brought "under control".
- The Houses of Parliament announces it will stop serving alcohol on its premises after 10pm, despite not being subject to England's COVID-19 laws.
- The National Police Chiefs Council (NPCC) confirms officers are being told not to install the NHS COVID-19 contact-tracing app to their work smartphones, while some officers have been told they may not need to follow self-isolation alerts if they have the app on their personal phones.

==== 29 September ====
- A survey of 2,000 people aged 16–25 carried out by The Prince's Trust indicates that 44% are less optimistic about their future prospects following the COVID-19 pandemic.
- Bakery chain Greggs says it is consulting with unions and staff about potential job cuts after the furlough scheme ends as part of cost-cutting measures, because it expects business to "remain below normal for the foreseeable future".
- The UK records 7,143 new COVID-19 cases with 71 COVID-related deaths, the highest since 1 July.
- After carrying out a technical review of the NHS COVID-19 app, the National Police Chiefs' Council says it will now recommend that officers can download it to their personal phones and use it at work.
- The world's longest-running play, the Agatha Christie murder mystery The Mousetrap, postpones plans to resume because of the COVID-19 pandemic. The play had been scheduled to return on 23 October as one of the first West End theatre performances to recommence.

==== 30 September ====
- The charity Breast Cancer Now estimates that as many as a million women have missed breast screening appointments because of the COVID-19 pandemic, and that around 8,600 may have undetected breast cancer.
- Charities, including the Joseph Rowntree Foundation, call on the Chancellor to make a temporary £20 rise in Universal Credit permanent amid poverty concerns; the rise is due to expire in April 2021.
- Sir Lindsay Hoyle, the Speaker of the House of Commons, rebukes the government for treating parliament with "contempt" by introducing new COVID measures without debate, but stops short of allowing time for the Brady Amendment to be debated, saying it is not a decision he has "taken lightly". Health Secretary Matt Hancock subsequently says that MPs will be allowed to vote on measures "whenever possible".
- At Prime Minister's Questions, Boris Johnson defends the use of local lockdown measures, saying that "strong local action" is needed in response to "a serious and growing" virus resurgence.
- Johnson holds a briefing at Downing Street, where he says measures introduced two weeks previously "will take time to feed through", that the UK is at a "critical moment" and the rising number of COVID cases and deaths shows "why our plan is so essential".

=== October 2020 ===
==== 1 October ====
- A study of COVID cases by Imperial College London, the largest of its type in England to date, suggests the spread of the virus may be slowing. The study also suggests the R number has fallen since measures such as the rule of six were introduced, but warns infections are still high, at an estimated 1 in 200 people.
- Boris Johnson's father, Stanley Johnson, issues an apology after he was pictured in a shop without a face covering, while former Labour Party leader Jeremy Corbyn also apologises after holding a dinner party attended by more than six people.
- The Welsh Government gives its permission for filming of the ITV reality show I'm a Celebrity...Get Me Out of Here! to go ahead, despite Conwy, the area where it is taking place, being subject to a local lockdown.
- Scottish National Party MP Margaret Ferrier is suspended from the party after it emerged she travelled by train from her constituency to Westminster while experiencing COVID symptoms; Ferrier says there is "no excuse" for her behaviour.
- Teaching unions have been angered by government plans to use emergency powers under the Coronavirus Act 2020 to force schools to offer online lessons as well as face-to-face teaching; one in six secondary schools are closed to some pupils because of COVID-19.
- A report produced by a group of researchers brought together by the Royal Society concludes that even with a COVID vaccine life would not return to normal until Spring 2021.
- Turkey, Poland and the Caribbean islands of Bonaire, St Eustatius and Saba are removed from the UK's quarantine exemption list.
- BBC News reports that COVID-19 restrictions are to be simplified into a three-tier system following confusion over local rules.

==== 2 October ====
- Around a quarter of the population of the United Kingdom, about 16.8 million people, are now in local lockdowns. This includes 23% of people in England, 76% of people in Wales and 32% of people in Scotland.
- As the R number rises to between 1.3 and 1.6, Prime Minister Boris Johnson suggests the rise in COVID cases in the UK is due to "fraying of people's discipline" over the summer.
- The Metropolitan Police launches an investigation into the actions of Margaret Ferrier.
- Three separate analyses of COVID-19 cases in England and Wales indicate the rate of new infections is slowing; senior scientists urge caution.
- The release date of the James Bond film No Time to Die is delayed until 2 April 2021, the second time its release has been postponed because of the pandemic.
- The Department of Health says it is fixing a glitch with the NHS COVID-19 app whereby people receive messages that disappear, but warns it could take some time to fix the error. The messages are being generated by the Google and Apple framework rather than by the app itself.

==== 3 October ====
- The number of new daily cases exceeds 10,000, with a further 12,872 cases confirmed, but the government attributes the high number to a technical issue that means previously unreported cases from the previous week are added to the daily total.
- Travel company PGL, which specialises in hosting school trips, announces the loss of 670 jobs, a quarter of its workforce.
- Addressing the 2020 Conservative Party Conference, Foreign Secretary Dominic Raab speaks of his fear for Boris Johnson's life while he was in intensive care with COVID-19.

==== 4 October ====
- A further 22,961 COVID-19 cases are confirmed, taking the total so far to 502,978. This figure includes 15,841 cases confirmed between 25 September and 1 October that were not included previously because of a technical error, thus making the day's total artificially high for both England and the UK.
- Cinema chain Cineworld announces plans to temporarily close its UK cinemas due to the delay in the release of big budget films because of the COVID-19 pandemic. The company says 5,500 jobs are at risk and will write to Boris Johnson, and Culture Secretary Oliver Dowden to say the industry is now "unviable".
- The delayed 2020 London Marathon is held on a specially designed closed loop course because of the COVID-19 pandemic.
- Health Secretary Matt Hancock announces that the British Army will be called in to help distribute the COVID-19 vaccine alongside the NHS as soon as the vaccine is ready to be rolled out.

==== 5 October ====
- Public Health England confirms that all of those involved in the delayed reporting of daily COVID-19 cases have been contacted, but that the delay has meant that their close contacts have not. An investigation is launched into the error. Health Secretary Matt Hancock says it should not have happened, but the glitch "has not substantially changed" the government's assessment of the epidemic.
- In a speech to the Conservative Party Conference, Chancellor Rishi Sunak says he will "always balance the books" despite the increased level of government spending brought about by the COVID-19 pandemic.
- Following news that Cineworld is to temporarily close its UK and US operations, Prime Minister Boris Johnson urges people to go to the cinema.
- Odeon Cinemas announces it will reduce its opening hours to weekends only at some cinemas in the UK and Ireland because of the delay in big film releases.
- Amid concerns of risk to outdoor education, UK Outdoors, the body representing the sector, urges Boris Johnson to act to allow overnight school trips to resume, and thus save the "great British tradition" of outdoor education.
- The Welsh Government says it is considering introducing quarantine restrictions for people arriving into Wales from COVID-19 hotspots elsewhere in the UK.
- The head of the UK's vaccine taskforce, Kate Bingham, reveals that less than half the country's population could be vaccinated against COVID-19 and that people under 18 are not expected to be vaccinated.

==== 6 October ====
- The UK records a further 14,542 COVID-19 cases, and 76 deaths.
- Addressing the Conservative Party Conference, Prime Minister Boris Johnson says the COVID-19 pandemic must be a catalyst for change, and that the UK cannot return to "normal" after it.
- The Daily Record reports that MP Margaret Ferrier attended mass at a Glasgow church while experiencing COVID-19 symptoms.

==== 7 October ====
- A problem with the UK's sole distribution centre for Roche in Sussex has led to a significant decrease in the capacity to process COVID-19 assays, swabs and reagents which has meant that Roche have alerted the NHS of the shortage. According to the pharmaceutical company, it could be two to three weeks before the supply chain issues are resolved.
- Pub retailer Greene King announces the loss of 800 jobs, citing the impact of tighter lockdown measures as the reason. The brewer has closed 79 pubs temporarily, a third of which it says will remain shut on a permanent basis.
- The UK government announces the establishment of the Global Travel Taskforce to look at introducing a COVID-19 testing system for travellers to the UK, giving them the chance to spend less time in self-isolation if they receive a negative test.

==== 8 October ====
- Figures released by the Office for National Statistics indicate there were three times more deaths from COVID-19 than from flu and pneumonia in England and Wales between January and August 2020. 48,168 COVID deaths were recorded, compared to 13,600 from pneumonia, and 394 from flu.
- The National Trust announces the loss of 1,300 jobs, citing the COVID-19 pandemic as the reason for its decision.
- A University of Edinburgh study suggests that imposing strict lockdowns and school closures may lead to a greater number of COVID-19 deaths in the long term. The study argues that herd immunity reduces the severity of the second wave, and that lockdowns only work as a short term measure if a vaccine is found quickly.
- Strictly Come Dancing's 2021 live arena tour is postponed until 2022 because of COVID-19.

==== 9 October ====
- The ONS reports that COVID-19 cases have "increased rapidly", estimating that around 1 in 240 people in England had the virus during the week to 1 October. Scientific advisers say that hospital admissions, which are currently about one fifth the level they were at their peak, are now "very close" to levels seen at the start of the crisis in early March.
- Chancellor Rishi Sunak announces an expansion of the Job Support Scheme that will see the Treasury pay two thirds of the wages of employees whose firms are forced to close because of COVID-19 restrictions.
- Edinburgh Woollen Mill, owner of the Peacocks and Jaeger clothing brands, announces plans to appoint an administrator after poor retail figures during the COVID-19 pandemic leaves them on the brink of collapse.
- Figures show the UK economy grew by 2.1% in August 2020, something aided by the Eat Out to Help Out scheme, but the figures are below expectation.

==== 10 October ====
- The delayed 2020 Birthday Honours are published, with frontline workers and volunteers who contributed to the COVID-19 response honoured.
- The Prime Minister is to inform the House of Commons on Monday, 12 October, of the anticipated new local measures that are intended to curb the spread of COVID-19.
- The doctors trade union the British Medical Association publishes a list of recommendations it says would help to reduce infection rates, including the compulsory wearing of face coverings in all work settings unless someone is working alone, and in all outdoor settings where two-metre social distancing is not possible.

==== 11 October ====
- Warning that the UK is at a "precarious point" in COVID-19 cases, leading UK scientist Professor Peter Horby says a second national lockdown is a possibility, but something people must do their best to avoid at all costs.
- UK universities are facing anger from students in self-isolation, critical of the quality and cost of food parcels, which they say often contain "junk" food.
- In an interview with the Sun on Sunday, Scottish National Party MP Margaret Ferrier says her decision to travel on public transport while experiencing COVID-19 symptoms was a "blip" and that the virus makes people "act out of character".
- Vue Cinemas announce plans to close a quarter of their venues for three days a week in order to reduce costs.
- Scientists at the University of Exeter are to begin trials of the BCG vaccine, developed in 1921, to see if it is effective against COVID-19.

==== 12 October ====
- Prime Minister Boris Johnson unveils the new three-tier system of restrictions for England, taking effect from 14 October. Areas are grouped into one of three risk categories – medium, high, or very high. Medium areas are subject to the rule of six and the 10pm curfew, high areas have restrictions on indoor meetings but groups of six can continue to meet in outdoor settings, and very high areas will see the closure of businesses such as pubs and casinos, but not restaurants. The Liverpool City Region is the only area to be placed in the very high category.
- Newly released papers show that the Scientific Advisory Group for Emergencies (SAGE) recommended a short "circuit breaker" lockdown for England in September as a way of controlling the virus.
- The UK hospitality sector says it will launch legal action against local lockdown rules that could force pubs, bars and restaurants to close.
- A BBC Panorama documentary reports on the growing calls for an inquest into the death of rail transport worker Belly Mujinga, who died after reportedly being coughed and spat on by a passenger who claimed to have COVID-19.

==== 13 October ====
- Following the news that SAGE recommended a short period of lockdown as a "circuit breaker", Labour Party leader Sir Keir Starmer urges the government to impose a two or three week period of lockdown in England so that the country does not "sleepwalk into... a bleak winter".
- Figures reveal that UK unemployment has risen to its highest level since 2017, with an increase of 4.5% in the three months up to August 2020.

==== 14 October ====
- The First COVID-19 tier regulations come into force, defining three levels of restrictions to be applied as necessary in geographic areas. These replace and revoke the existing local lockdown regulations. The Liverpool City Region is the first to be assigned to the strictest tier.
- The British Medical Journal reports the rare case of a patient who suffered permanent hearing loss following an episode of COVID-19.
- NHS Hospital Trusts in Plymouth, Liverpool and Belfast are cancelling planned elective procedures outright or scaling-back surgery due to an upsurge in COVID-19 patients requiring intensive care.
- Mark Drakeford, the First Minister of Wales, announces plans to ban visitors to Wales from other parts of the UK with high COVID-19 rates.

==== 15 October ====
- A study by University College London reveals that up to 17 per cent of the population of the UK could refuse to be immunised by a COVID-19 vaccine.
- Italy, Vatican City and San Marino are removed from the quarantine exemption list following a rise in COVID-19 cases in Italy.
- The House of Commons announces plans to stop selling alcohol in its bars and restaurants amid tighter COVID restrictions for London.
- The Metropolitan Police says it will take no further action against MP Margaret Ferrier for her breach of COVID-19 rules.

==== 16 October ====
- The Office for National Statistics estimates there are 27,900 new COVID-19 cases a day in England, a 60% increase on the previous week, while the R number rises to between 1.3 and 1.5.
- Wales introduces a travel ban on people from COVID hotspots in other parts of the UK, beginning from 6pm.

==== 17 October ====
- Kate Bingham, chair of the UK's Vaccine Taskforce, reveals that a COVID-19 vaccine will only protect some people from infection and in the first instance will be limited in supply. The JCVI advises that those in need will be prioritised.

==== 18 October ====
- The British Chambers of Commerce urges the government to provide better financial support to firms in order to avoid the "catastrophic consequences" of COVID restrictions.
- Jeremy Farrar, one of the scientists who sits on the SAGE committee, warns that Christmas 2020 will be "tough" and is unlikely to be the "usual celebration" of "families coming together".

==== 19 October ====
- Yasmin Qureshi, the MP for Bolton South East, is admitted to hospital with pneumonia after testing positive for COVID-19.
- 18,804 new cases who have tested positive for COVID-19 are reported for the UK as a whole with 80 further fatalities.
- Figures published by the Office for National Statistics indicate almost 1,000 additional non-COVID deaths at home were recorded every week between March and September 2020, while there were 27 million fewer GP appointments between March and August. Cancer Research UK estimates 350,000 referrals have been missed since March, with thousands of ill patients not receiving treatment.

==== 20 October ====
- Passengers flying from Heathrow Airport to Italy and Hong Kong now have the option of buying a rapid turnaround COVID-19 test for £80. Unlike the PCR tests used by the NHS, the LAMP tests used by the Heathrow facility do not need to be processed at a laboratory.
- The UK announces plans to proceed with "human challenge" trials for a COVID vaccine involving around 90 people, who will be deliberately exposed to the virus in order to determine the level of exposure needed to become infected.
- 241 COVID-19 related deaths are recorded, the highest daily number for several months.

==== 21 October ====
- Trials of a COVID-19 vaccine being developed by AstraZeneca and Oxford University are to continue following a review into the death of a volunteer in Brazil. Details of the death have not been disclosed, but Oxford University says a "careful assessment" of the circumstances has revealed no safety concerns.
- A further 26,688 COVID-19 cases are recorded, the highest daily figure so far.
- Gaby Appleton, the former managing director of Researcher Products at publisher Elsevier, has been appointed as boss of NHS Test and Trace, succeeding Simon Thompson, Sky News reports.

==== 22 October ====
- Chancellor Rishi Sunak unveils increased support for jobs and workers affected by COVID restrictions, with employers paying less and employees able to work fewer hours before qualifying for extra financial help.
- The Canary Islands, the Greek Island of Mykonos, the Maldives and Denmark are added to the quarantine exemption list, effective from 4am on 24 October, while Liechtenstein is removed from it.

==== 23 October ====
- The Office for National Statistics estimates there to be 35,200 daily COVID cases in England, an increase of 25% on the previous week, with the highest number of cases occurring in northern England.
- A warning is issued that bogus "COVID marshals" are visiting people's homes in an attempt to gain entry so they can issue spurious fines or even offer counterfeit tests for COVID-19.

==== 24 October ====
- An error message when trying to access the NHS COVID-19 app is reported by some users of the newly launched iPhone 12 and iPhone 12 Pro.
- Shakespeare's Globe, Birmingham Hippodrome, the Old Vic theatre and the English National Ballet are among 35 arts venues to receive financial help from the Culture Recovery Fund.

==== 25 October ====
- The Telegraph suggests the 14-day quarantine period for those who come into contact with a person having tested positive for COVID-19 could be cut to seven days amid ongoing criticism of NHS Test and Trace.

==== 26 October ====
- Pharmacy retailer Boots announces it will make available a COVID test that can give a result in twelve minutes. The test, produced by LumiraDx, will cost £120.
- Scientists report that the Oxford University COVID-19 vaccine shows a "strong immune response" among elderly volunteers.

==== 27 October ====
- A study by Imperial College London and Ipsos MORI suggests COVID-19 antibodies may last a matter of months, with figures indicating the number of people with antibodies has fallen by 26.5% over three months.
- The United Kingdom records 367 COVID-19 deaths, the highest number in a single day since May.
- Office for National Statistics figures indicate the number of deaths mentioning COVID-19 in England and Wales has risen for the sixth week in a row, with 670 death certificates mentioning the condition in the week up to 19 October, a 53% increase on the previous week.

==== 28 October ====
- A projection published by the Scientific Advisory Group for Emergencies (SAGE) suggests COVID deaths will remain high throughout the coming winter, leading to a greater number of deaths than was seen earlier in the year.

==== 29 October ====
- A study by Imperial College London suggests there are 100,000 new COVID-19 cases in England each day, with the number of cases doubling every nine days.
- An updated version of the NHS COVID-19 contact tracing app will issue more self-isolation notices, its new boss, Gaby Appleton, has said.
- Cyprus and Lithuania are removed from the quarantine exemption list, the change taking effect from 4am on Sunday 1 November.
- Model railway maker Hornby reports a 33% increase in profits during the six months up to September 2020 as more people take up hobbies during lockdown.
- Broadcaster Channel 4 announces plans to repay £1.5m in furlough payments to the government after finding itself in a "robust financial position ahead of expectations".

==== 30 October ====
- Documents produced by the Scientific Advisory Group for Emergencies have claimed COVID-19 is spreading "significantly" faster through England than their predicted "worst-case" scenario, with four times as many cases as anticipated.
- The Office for National Statistics infection survey in England showed that secondary school children up to age 16 had the fastest rate of increase in COVID-19 incidence of any age range, giving them the second highest average incidence of 2.0% of any measured age range, fifty times higher than when children returned to school after the summer holiday, and just slightly behind the 16 to 24 years old age range.
- Mark Drakeford, the First Minister of Wales, says that the UK government is to hold a meeting to discuss a set of UK-wide COVID rules for Christmas.

==== 31 October ====
- The UK reaches a million COVID-19 cases, as a further 21,915 recorded cases take the total to 1,011,660.
- After scientists project that there could be several thousand COVID deaths a day, Prime Minister Boris Johnson holds a Downing Street press conference at which he announces a second lockdown for England, for four weeks from Thursday 5 November to Wednesday 2 December, in order to prevent what he describes as a "medical and moral disaster" for the NHS. England will then revert to the tier system. Unlike the first lockdown in March, schools, colleges and universities remained open during the four week period.
- The furlough scheme, scheduled to end of 31 October, is extended until December following the announcement of the England-wide lockdown.
- The 2020 Six Nations Championship, delayed because of the COVID crisis, comes to a conclusion with England winning the title.

=== November 2020 ===
==== 1 November ====
- Mortgage payment holidays for people financially impacted by the COVID crisis are extended, having been scheduled to expire on 31 October.

==== 2 November ====
- An article produced by the Oxford University-based Centre for Evidence-Based Medicine suggests slides estimating the number of COVID deaths presented at the Downing Street press conference on 31 October are based on models from at least three weeks ago, and are therefore overestimating the number of potential fatalities.
- A UK study of 100 people who have tested positive for COVID-19 shows they still have T cells six month after infection.
- Brexit Party leader Nigel Farage applies to change the name of the party to Reform UK, and says it will fight the government's "woeful" response to COVID-19 and its lockdown strategy that "result in more life-years lost than it hopes to save".

==== 3 November ====
- A further 397 COVID-related deaths take the total number of fatalities to 47,250, the highest daily rise since 27 May.

==== 4 November ====
- MPs vote 516–39 to support the four-week lockdown restrictions for England that come into force from the following day, with 34 Conservative MPs among those to vote against the measures, while a further 19 Conservatives abstain from voting.
- The UK records a further 492 COVID-related deaths, the highest number since 19 May, and bringing the total to 47,742.

==== 5 November ====
- As England's second lockdown begins, the UK Statistics Authority criticises the government over the way it presented data estimating potential COVID deaths to justify the measures at the 31 October Downing Street press conference, and calls for greater transparency of data and the way projections are made.
- Chancellor Rishi Sunak extends the furlough scheme to the end of March 2021.
- Germany and Sweden are removed from the quarantine exemption list with effect from 4am on Saturday 7 November.

==== 6 November ====
- Figures from the Office for National Statistics indicate the rate of growth of COVID-19 cases is slowing; the ONS reports there were around 50,000 in the week ending 30 October, roughly one person in 90.
- The UK government accepts a mistake was made during the 31 October Downing Street briefing after a graph predicting 1,500 daily COVID deaths by 8 December is revised down to 1,010, but it says the "underlying analysis" of the threat to the NHS is correct.
- Denmark is removed from the quarantine exemption list as of 4am after Danish health authorities discover a mutated strain of COVID-19 present in the country's mink population.

==== 7 November ====
- Non-UK nationals are banned from arriving in the UK from Denmark after the discovery of a mutated strain of COVID-19 in the country's mink population that is believed to have spread to humans.
- Queen Elizabeth II wears a face covering in public for the first time during a visit to the Tomb of the Unknown Soldier at Westminster Abbey.
- The latest tranche of Culture Recovery Fund money is awarded, with £14m awarded to 162 heritage organisations, including St Paul's Cathedral, which is given £2.1m.

==== 8 November ====
- Non-UK hauliers are added to the Denmark travel ban.
- Scaled back Remembrance Sunday services take place, including at Whitehall which is closed to the public.

==== 9 November ====
- The Pfizer and BioNTech COVID-19 vaccine is reported to protect 90% of recipients in initial tests from developing COVID-19.
- Responding to news of a potential vaccine, Prime Minister Boris Johnson tells a Downing Street press conference the vaccine has "cleared a significant hurdle", but warns it is "very, very early days" and there are "several more hurdles" ahead.
- Transport Secretary Grant Shapps announces the UK is making "good progress" in developing a testing regime to reduce the quarantine period for international arrivals.

==== 10 November ====
- Health Secretary Matt Hancock announces that the NHS is ready to begin providing the COVID vaccine "as fast as safely possible".
- Figures from the Office for National Statistics show the number of COVID-related deaths has exceeded 1,000 for the first time since June, with 1,379 deaths in the week ending 30 October, accounting for 12.7% of UK deaths in that week.
- Figures show that UK unemployment stood at 4.8% in the three months to September 2020, up from 4.5%, as a result of the COVID crisis.
- A group of Conservative MPs who voted against England's second lockdown have formed the COVID Recovery Group to argue for a different approach to dealing with the virus once restrictions end on 2 December, one that will enable society to "live with the virus".

==== 11 November ====
- The UK becomes the fifth country to record 50,000 COVID-related deaths after the United States, Brazil, India and Mexico, when a further 595 deaths take the total to 50,365.
- A review commissioned by Chancellor Rishi Sunak suggests £1.4bn could be raised by doubling Capital Gains Tax and cutting exemptions, as the government looks for ways of paying off the debt incurred by the COVID crisis.
- A virtual meeting between Cabinet Minister Michael Gove and the leaders of the devolved nations has taken place to discuss a strategy for getting students home for Christmas.

==== 12 November ====
- The UK records a further 33,470 COVID-19 cases, the highest daily increase since mass testing began.
- The UK economy expanded by 15.5% between July and September 2020 as Britain came out of the recession caused by the first lockdown, the largest growth percentage since figures began in 1955. But the Office for National Statistics indicates that GDP is still below pre-COVID levels.
- Travellers arriving into the UK from most of Greece (except Corfu, Crete, Rhodes, Kos and Zakynthos) will be required to quarantine for two weeks, effective from 4am on Saturday 14 November; Qatar, the United Arab Emirates, Laos, the Turks and Caicos Islands, Bahrain, Chile, Iceland and Cambodia are all added to the quarantine exemption list.
- Scientists monitoring the ZOE COVID symptom study app suggest the R number may have dropped below 1 in the UK to around 0.9.
- Emails seen by the BBC suggest the Health and Safety Executive was pressured by the UK government to declare PPE suits bought in April as safe despite them not having been properly tested.

==== 13 November ====
- The R number has fallen to between 1.2 and 1.0, while the Office for National Statistics reports that overall COVID cases in England slowed in the week ending 6 November.
- According to government scientific advisers, the number of children with COVID-19 has increased significantly in comparison to the spring, with children often bringing the virus into households. The National Education Union says it is troubled by the number of children testing positive.

==== 14 November ====
- The opposition Labour Party urges the government to introduce emergency legislation to curb anti-vaccine content online.
- Bakery retailer Greggs announces the loss of 820 jobs as a result of a slump in business because of the COVID crisis.

==== 15 November ====
- Professor Ugur Sahin, co-founder of BioNTech, says a COVID vaccine could halve the transmission rate, and enable life to return to normal by winter 2021–22.
- Professor John Edmunds, a member of the Scientific Advisory Group for Emergencies, calls for a long-term strategy to balance the epidemic and the economy, saying that encouraging people to visit bars and restaurants then closing them because of a surge in cases is not a "sensible way to run the epidemic".
- Prime Minister Boris Johnson is self-isolating after coming into contact with someone who tested positive for COVID-19.

==== 16 November ====
- The Prime Minister, six Conservative MPs and two political aides are now self-isolating after coming into contact with Conservative MP Lee Anderson, who later tested positive for COVID-19. They were all present at a Downing Street breakfast meeting on 12 November, and were later contacted by NHS Test and Trace.
- The UK secures a deal to order 5m doses of a vaccine being developed by US biotechnology company Moderna, which has announced tests have shown it to be 95% effective in combating COVID-19.
- A technical glitch with the NHS COVID-19 app has prevented a number of iPhone users from being able to launch it. The NHS has published a workaround for the issue but has not disclosed the cause of it.

==== 17 November ====
- Prime Minister Boris Johnson has tested negative for COVID-19.
- Figures from the Office for National Statistics show there have been 70,830 excess deaths since the beginning of the pandemic, while 2,225 deaths mentioning COVID were recorded in the week up to 6 November.
- Police chiefs in England and Wales temporarily suspend £10,000 fines for gatherings of over 30 people following concern over a disparity between those who pay upfront and those who challenge the fines in court. They have instead advised police forces to issue court summonses for those who break COVID restrictions.
- Scientists at the University of Cardiff have discovered that mouthwash can destroy COVID-19 under lab conditions within 30 seconds, suggesting it may be a potential way of tackling the virus.
- British Airways announces a COVID testing programme in partnership with American Airlines for passengers travelling on some routes between Heathrow and the United States in a bid to have quarantine restrictions lifted by the UK government.
- Legal documents filed in the United States have revealed that a Spanish businessman who acted as a go-between to secure PPE for the NHS at the beginning of the pandemic was paid £21m of UK taxpayers' money.

==== 18 November ====
- A report by the National Audit Office has found that suppliers of Personal Protective Equipment (PPE) with political connections were 10 times more likely to be awarded contracts during the COVID crisis. In response to the report, Prime Minister Boris Johnson says he is "proud" of the way the government obtained supplies of PPE.
- All four of the Home Nations are reported to be looking at ways of relaxing COVID rules so families from across the UK can spend Christmas together. But SAGE warns that five days of tighter restrictions may be required for every day that regulations are relaxed over the festive period.
- Data released concerning the COVID vaccine developed by Pfizer and BioNTech indicate it to be 94% effective in those aged 65 and over, but equally effective in people of all ages and ethnicities.
- Data released by the Office for National Statistics indicates that loneliness is at its highest since the beginning of the pandemic, with a quarter of the 4,000 people surveyed saying they felt lonely always, often or sometimes, with the figure rising to 34% among those aged 16–29.

==== 19 November ====
- The Oxford University COVID vaccine is reported to show a strong immune response in those in their 60s and 70s, something researchers have described as "encouraging".
- Researchers in the UK and Netherlands have found that tocilizumab, a drug used to treat rheumatoid arthritis, shows promising signs of being able to treat critically ill COVID patients in trials.
- Israel, Sri Lanka, Namibia, Rwanda, the US Virgin Islands, Uruguay, Bonaire, St Eustatius and Saba and the Northern Mariana Islands are all added to the UK's quarantine exemption list. No countries are removed from the list.
- Fashion retailers Peacocks and Jaeger go into administration after their owners, Edinburgh Woollen Mill Group fails to find a buyer, risking 4,700 jobs.
- The UK government announces £300m of emergency funding for sports impacted by the absence of spectators.
- First Minister of Scotland Nicola Sturgeon says that governments across the UK face a "difficult balance" over how to approach Christmas.

==== 20 November ====
- Figures from the Office for National Statistics suggest that COVID-19 cases are beginning to plateau in England and Scotland, but are still increasing in Wales and Northern Ireland.
- At a Downing Street briefing, Health Secretary Matt Hancock announces that COVID-19 vaccination centres are to be established throughout the UK in preparation for the rollout of a vaccine. These will be in addition to the vaccine being given by GP's surgeries and hospitals.
- A study of healthcare workers at Oxford University Hospitals has suggested that COVID antibodies are still present in the body six months after infection.

==== 21 November ====
- Sources have reported that families will be allowed to form extended bubbles for seven days over the Christmas period to allow them to spend time together over the festive season.
- Downing Street confirms plans to introduce a tougher three-tier system of COVID restrictions for England when the lockdown ends on 2 December.
- Sources, including BBC News, report that Chancellor Rishi Sunak is to announce a £500m package to support mental health services in England, which have been in greater demand because of the COVID crisis.

==== 22 November ====
- The Observer reports that campaigners are taking legal action against the UK government over its appointment of Dido Harding, Kate Bingham and Mike Coupe to key roles in its tackling of COVID-19.
- Chancellor Rishi Sunak is to announce an extra £3bn for the NHS in the forthcoming spending review, but warns of an "economic shock laid bare" as the country deals with the COVID crisis.
- The Home Nations give their backing to plans to allow some household mixing "for a small number of days" over Christmas.

==== 23 November ====
- A large trial of the COVID vaccine being developed by the University of Oxford indicates it to be 70% effective, but scientists believe that figure can rise to 90% by tweaking the dosage.
- Prime Minister Boris Johnson confirms that England's previous three-tier system of COVID regulations will return in a new form once the lockdown expires on 2 December, but with toughened measures for each area. Gyms and non-essential shops will reopen throughout England, while collective worship and weddings will be allowed again, as well as some spectator sport. The second tier status of each region will be reviewed every 14 days, with the regional approach scheduled to last until March 2021.
- Following reports over the previous two days that a "freedom pass" could be introduced to allow people who have tested negative for COVID to have greater freedom of movement, Johnson says there will be "no forced vaccination" in the UK.
- An extra £7bn of government funding is announced for NHS Test and Trace, bringing the total spent on the project so far to £22bn.

==== 24 November ====
- The leaders of the UK's four nations agree on plans for Christmas that will allow three households to meet up indoors and outdoors for five days from 23 to 27 December. Northern Ireland will be allowed seven days of relaxed restrictions from 22 to 28 December to accommodate those travelling to or from the mainland.
- As much as £1bn in fraudulent benefit claims made by organised gangs of criminals has been prevented from being paid during lockdown.
- Analysis of UK death certificates indicates UK deaths to be almost a fifth higher than the five year average.
- Professor Andrew Hayward, director of the UCL Institute of Epidemiology and Health Care, and a member of SAGE, warns people to be cautious over Christmas, suggesting the relaxing of rules is tantamount to "throwing fuel on the Covid fire".

==== 25 November ====
- Chancellor Rishi Sunak outlines the Spending Review for how much will be spent on public services, and warns that the "economic emergency" caused by COVID has only just begun. The Review comes as the Office for Budget Responsibility forecasts that unemployment will reach 7.5% because of the crisis. The UK economy is also predicted to shrink by 11.3%, the biggest decline in 300 years, while debt is forecast to be at its highest outside wartime.
- A further 696 COVID-19 deaths were announced for the UK, the highest daily figure since 5 May 2020.

==== 26 November ====
- England's new tier system is announced, to come into force on 2 December. Most of the country, including London and Liverpool, will be Tier 2, while large parts of the Midlands, North East and North West, including Greater Manchester and Birmingham, will be in Tier 3. Only the Isle of Wight, Cornwall and the Isles of Scilly will be in Tier 1.
- Media question the efficiency of the Oxford–AstraZeneca COVID-19 vaccine, since a preliminary report combined results from two trials which used different doses.

==== 27 November ====
- The R number is thought to be between 0.9 and 1.0, the first time it has been below 1 since August.
- Retail group Arcadia is reported to be on the brink of collapse, threatening 13,000 jobs. The group has stated that COVID has had a "material impact on trading across our businesses". Arcadia goes into administration three days later.
- The UK government's Scientific Advisory Group for Emergencies (SAGE) has issued a document advising people to avoid board games and sleepovers during Christmas, and to involve women in the decision-making process for organising Christmas events because they "carry the burden of creating and maintaining family traditions and activities at Christmas".

==== 28 November ====
- Writing in The Times, Cabinet Office Minister Michael Gove warns backbench Conservative MPs planning to vote against the new tier system for England that without the measures hospitals throughout the country will become overwhelmed with COVID cases.
- Amid anger from backbench Conservatives over the tier system, Prime Minister Boris Johnson writes to rebel MPs offering them a "sunset" of 3 February for the expiration of the regulations.
- Nadhim Zahawi is appointed as Parliamentary Under-Secretary of State for COVID-19 Vaccine Deployment.

==== 29 November ====
- The UK government signs a deal for a further 2 million doses of the Moderna vaccine, bringing the total number of doses secured now to 7 million, sourced from 7 different suppliers.

==== 30 November ====
- Version 4 of the NHS COVID-19 app is to include a self-isolation payment feature in a bid to encourage more people to download it and follow its advice, and following earlier concerns over privacy safeguards that had prevented those receiving an automated message from the app from making claims.
- London AI laboratory DeepMind is reported to have predicted how a protein folds into a unique three-dimensional shape, work that could provide the answers to a number of human conditions, including COVID-19.
- In a bid to persuade backbench MPs to support the new tier regulations for England, the UK government publishes data behind its decision to introduce the measures, stating that it seeks to "balance the many complex impacts" of restrictions and keep them in place "for as short a time as possible", but that allowing COVID to spread "would lead to impacts...considered intolerable for society". In response, senior Conservative MP Mark Harper claims the "wheels are coming off the government's arguments".
- Professor Dame Sally Davies, the former Chief Medical Officer for England, suggests that the UK's high level of obesity has led to an increased rate in the number of COVID deaths.

=== December 2020 ===
==== 1 December ====
- Cabinet Office Minister Michael Gove says there are no plans to introduce a "vaccine passport" giving people access to places such as pubs and restaurants once a vaccine becomes available.
- Education watchdog Ofsted reports that education has been "completely disrupted" by COVID-19 absences in some areas, with the West Midlands and North West of England particularly badly affected.
- MPs vote 291–78 in favour of introducing England's tough new COVID tier system, with 55 backbench Conservatives voting against the government, while another 16 abstain.

==== 2 December ====
- The UK becomes the first country in the world to approve the Pfizer/BioNTech COVID-19 vaccine, with vaccinations beginning once supplies arrive the following week. Prime Minister Boris Johnson welcomes the vaccine, but warns people should not get "carried away with over optimism".
- In England, the second "lockdown" ends and is replaced by a revived tiered system, as announced on 26 November.

==== 3 December ====
- The number of recorded COVID-related deaths in the UK passes 60,000 after a further 414 deaths take the total to 60,113.
- Dr Anthony Fauci, the leading infectious disease expert in the United States, criticises the UK's approval process for the Pfizer/BioNTech vaccine, suggesting that it has not been as rigorous as that of the US. In defence the UK says the vaccination is safe and effective. Fauci later retracts his statement and apologises for the comments.
- England's deputy chief medical officer, Jonathan Van-Tam, says that the first wave of vaccines could cut the number of hospitalisations and deaths in England by 99%.
- After some ministers suggest that Brexit speeded up the process allowing the UK to get the vaccine first, Education Secretary Gavin Williamson responds by saying that the UK got the vaccine first because it is a "much better country" with superior medical experts.
- The first batch of the Pfizer/BioNTech vaccine arrives in the UK, and is stored at an undisclosed location ready for distribution to hospitals vaccination centres around the country.
- The student travel window opens, allowing them to return home from university for Christmas.
- Supermarket retailer Asda announces plans to repay £340m of business rates relief to the government, joining Tesco, Sainsbury's, Morrisons and Aldi which have made similar announcements, meaning £1.7bn of rates relief is to be repaid.

==== 4 December ====
- The Medicines and Healthcare products Regulatory Agency says the COVID-19 vaccine will "definitely" be ready to go into care homes within the next two weeks.
- The UK is unlikely to get 10 million doses of the Pfizer/BioNTech vaccine by the end of the year after production estimates for 2020 are scaled back.
- Business Secretary Alok Sharma says the UK government is "absolutely confident" that Britain will have 800,000 doses of the Pfizer/BioNTech vaccine by the following week.
- Figures from the Office for National Statistics indicate COVID-19 rates are falling in every part of England apart from the North East, with 1 in 105 people having the virus in the week up to 28 November, down from 1 in 85 the week before.
- The R number falls to between 0.8 and 1.0.

==== 5 December ====
- The Duke and Duchess of Cambridge announce a three-day UK tour aboard the Royal train during which they will meet community and health workers who have played an important role during the COVID crisis.
- Labour Party leader Sir Keir Starmer is reported to be self-isolating after a member of his staff tested positive for COVID.

==== 6 December ====
- The Department of Health and Social Care confirms that the UK's vaccination rollout will begin on Tuesday 8 December.

==== 7 December ====
- Sir Simon Stevens, the chief executive of NHS England, says that the rollout of the vaccine, which begins the next day, could mark a "decisive turning point" in the battle against COVID-19.
- The UK Government says it expects the "majority" of vulnerable people to receive the vaccine in January and February 2021.

==== 8 December ====
- Margaret Keenan, 90, becomes the first person in the world to be given a COVID-19 vaccination as part of a mass vaccination programme after receiving the Pfizer COVID-19 vaccine as the rollout of vaccinations begins, William Shakespeare, 81 from Warwickshire becomes the second.
- Research published in The Lancet has concluded the Oxford–AstraZeneca COVID-19 vaccine is safe and effective, giving good protection. The majority of those involved in the research were under-55, but there is evidence it will protect older people too.

==== 9 December ====
- Regulators have urged anyone with a history of allergies not to take the Pfizer/BioNTech COVID vaccine for the time being after two NHS workers vaccinated the previous day had allergic reactions.
- A series of reports written for the UK government's Scientific Advisory Group for Emergencies (SAGE) by members of the COG-UK Consortium have attributed the resurgence of COVID cases to people travelling abroad during the summer.

==== 10 December ====
- Saudi Arabia and Botswana are added to the UK's travel corridor as of 4am on Saturday 12 December, while the Canary Islands are removed from it.
- Sky News presenter Kay Burley is taken off air for six months after she admitted breaching COVID regulations while celebrating her 60th birthday.
- An update to the NHS COVID-19 app is adding a way to apply for a £500 grant if it gives a self-isolation order.
- There is a warning that UK residents could be prevented from travelling to the European Union after 1 January 2021 as travel regulations associated with UK–EU travel expire because of Brexit, and because of travel restrictions associated with COVID.

==== 11 December ====
- The period of self-isolation for contacts of someone testing positive for COVID-19, and travellers returning from non-travel corridor countries, is reduced from 14 to 10 days, effective from Monday 14 December.
- Figures from the Office for National Statistics for the week ending 5 December indicate COVID cases in England are continuing to fall, apart from in London and the East of England.
- The R number has risen slightly on the previous week to between 0.9 and 1.0.
- A study published in the scientific journal Nature attempts to identify why some people with COVID do not display symptoms, pinpointing DNA and a shortfall of interferon as contributing factors.

==== 12 December ====
- Professor Linda Bauld, an expert in public health at the University of Edinburgh, describes the relaxation of COVID regulations over Christmas as a "mistake", as people travel from "high to low prevalence areas" to see relatives. In response, Wales's Health Minister, Vaughan Gething, says any change to Christmas rules could present "huge issues about trust" but could happen if cases remain high.
- Scientific experts warn people to rethink their plans for Christmas as COVID cases increase in some areas, and warn the country is heading towards "disaster".
- Figures have indicated that the number of outstanding criminal cases in England and Wales has risen from 39,331 in February to 51,595 at the end of October, an increase of 31%, prompting concerns it could lead to the collapse of some cases. Although the UK government has invested in the justice system to increase the number of trials being held, some hearings have been put back to 2023.

==== 13 December ====
- NHS bosses have urged people to think "really carefully" about more social contact over Christmas amid concerns it could lead to an increase in cases of COVID in January after there was an increase in cases in the United States following Thanksgiving.

==== 14 December ====
- Health Secretary Matt Hancock tells MPs that a new variant of SARS-CoV-2 has been identified that is spreading faster in some areas of the country. The variant, named VUI – 202012/01 and later Variant of Concern 202012/01 or Alpha, showed changes to the spike protein that could make the virus more infectious. As of 13 December, there were 1,108 cases identified.
- Artist Aliza Nisenbaum has created a series of paintings of NHS workers who have worked on the front line during the pandemic.

==== 15 December ====
- Figures have shown there were 819,000 fewer people on company payrolls at the end of November when compared to March and the start of the first lockdown, with a third of the jobs lost being in the hospitality sector.
- Britain's two leading medical journals, the Health Service Journal and British Medical Journal, have described the decision to relax COVID regulations over Christmas as a "rash decision" that could "cost many lives".
- Representatives from the four nations of the UK have met to discuss the relaxation of regulations over Christmas, but BBC News reports they are unlikely to change the agreed rules. Instead, advice on celebrating Christmas is expected to be strengthened to suggest people think carefully and remain local if they can.
- The Test to Release scheme begins in England, allowing travellers to pay privately for a COVID test five days after arrival, and end their quarantine period if they receive a negative test. But the launch is chaotic as the eleven private firms chosen by the government to administer the tests have teething problems.

==== 16 December ====
- London, and parts of Essex and Hertfordshire, are placed into tier three of England's COVID tier system following an increase in case numbers in those areas.
- Following a meeting between the leaders of the four nations of the UK, Prime Minister Boris Johnson announces that COVID regulations will still be relaxed for five days over the Christmas period, but urges people to think before meeting up with relatives. The three household rule will stay in place, except in Wales where the law is to be changed to specify only two households can meet, while in Scotland people will be urged to meet up on only one of the five days.
- Nadhim Zahawi, the Parliamentary Under-Secretary of State for COVID-19 Vaccine Deployment, announces that 137,897 people were given their first dose of the Pfizer/BioNTech vaccine between 8 and 15 December (the first week of the vaccination rollout).

==== 17 December ====
- Figures for England's NHS Test and Trace show it is reaching 92.7% of contacts, up from 85.9% the previous week; the increased success rate is attributed to improvements to the website, a reduction in repeat calls to households and more people making those calls.
- Chancellor Rishi Sunak extends the furlough scheme for a further month until the end of April 2021.
- Conservative MP Tobias Ellwood apologises after breaching COVID regulations by giving a speech at a dinner in London where 27 people were present.

==== 18 December ====
- Figures from the Office for National Statistics show that UK retail sales fell by 3.8% during November due to lockdown restrictions.
- The R number is believed to be above 1 again, and between 1.1 and 1.2.

==== 19 December ====
- With respect to just England, Prime Minister Boris Johnson announces that London and parts of the South East and East of England are to go into new Tier 4 restrictions from the following day. The rules are mostly the same as the national restrictions in November, with non-essential retail, hairdressers and gyms closing.
- In England, plans for Christmas bubbles are scrapped completely in Tier 4, while in the rest of England Christmas bubbles are limited to meeting up on Christmas Day.
- The total number of COVID-19 cases across the UK exceeds 2 million.
- A BBC investigation discovers that fake "COVID-19 immunity boosters" are being sold in shops in London.

==== 20 December ====
- Ireland, Germany, France, Italy, the Netherlands, Canada and Belgium halt flights to and from the UK following the emergence of a new variant of SARS-CoV-2. France also halts ferry traffic for 48 hours, and the Port of Dover is closed.
- 35,928 new cases of COVID are recorded, almost double the number recorded on the same day the previous week.

==== 21 December ====
- More than 40 countries have suspended flights to and from the UK. They include Hong Kong, which suspends all UK flights from the following day, with anyone spending more than two hours in the UK no longer able to fly to Hong Kong. India suspends UK flights until 31 December.
- As talks begin between UK and French officials aimed at reopening freight transport links between the two countries, UK supermarkets warn that some fresh produce may run short if the situation is not resolved.
- The Northern Ireland Executive votes against proposals to introduce a travel ban between Northern Ireland and the UK mainland.
- Sir Patrick Vallance, the UK's chief scientific adviser, suggests that more areas of England will need to go into tier four restrictions to combat the new variant of COVID-19.

==== 22 December ====
- The UK and France reach an agreement to reopen their border the following day. Freight drivers and EU citizens will be among people allowed to travel between the two countries, subject to a recent negative COVID test. NHS Test and Trace staff and the military will also be deployed to help carry out tests.
- Tesco reintroduces a purchasing limit on some items, including eggs, rice, soap and toilet roll to ensure there is not a shortage of the products through panic buying.
- Scientists have said the new variant of COVID was spotted in the UK because of the surveillance system in place, but that it may or may not originate outside the UK. Ugur Sahin, chief executive of BioNTech, says the vaccine developed by his firm in conjunction with Pfizer will work against the new strain.

==== 23 December ====
- It is announced that a number of areas in England will move up tiers on Boxing Day, including more areas being placed in Tier 4.
- UK scientists have detected two cases of a second new strain of COVID-19 that is believed to originate from South Africa. The UK government consequently suspends all flights from South Africa.
- France reopens its border to the UK, but there is a backlog of freight to clear. France's decision to close the border in the first place is criticised by European Commissioner for Transport Adina Valean, who says France went against the EU's recommendations.
- Former Prime Minister Tony Blair urges the government to give people a single dose of COVID vaccine rather than preserving stocks for a second jab.
- Desmond Shawe-Taylor, the Surveyor of The Queen's Pictures, and Rufus Bird, the Surveyor of The Queen's Works of Art, have both left their posts with the royal household and will not be replaced "for the time being" due to the impact of COVID-19 on royal finances.
- The UK government announces £1.1m of emergency funding for the radio industry to help create content to tackle loneliness during the COVID crisis.

==== 24 December ====
- Researchers at the London School of Hygiene and Tropical Medicine have suggested schools and universities may need to remain closed after Christmas to help control the spread of the new variant of COVID, as well as tougher restrictions.
- Figures released by the Office for National Statistics indicate 1 in 85 people in England has COVID, with figures for the week to 18 December estimating that almost 650,000 people had the virus, up from 570,000 the previous week. But ONS figures for Scotland indicate a fall in cases over the same period, with 37,100 (one in 140) people having the virus in the week to 18 December, a drop from 52,500 (one in 100) in the week up to 11 December. The new variant of COVID is believed to be responsible for 38% of new cases in the week up to 18 December. Figures for Wales indicate a sharp rise in cases, with an estimated 52,200 people with the virus in the week to 18 December, 18,800 more than the preceding week.
- The Christmas Eve Jingle, a doorstep bell-ringing event, is held at 6pm to help combat loneliness over Christmas.
- A travel ban from South Africa comes into force at 9am, prohibiting visitors to the UK from that country following the discovery of a new variant of COVID-19. The ban excludes UK and Irish nationals arriving in the UK.
- An outbreak occurs at the largest testing lab in the country, in Milton Keynes, after previous reports of poor health and safety practices at the lab.

==== 25 December ====
- A further 800 military personnel are sent to Kent to help clear the backlog of lorries waiting to cross the English Channel to France.
- The number of recorded COVID-related deaths in the UK passes 70,000 after a further 570 deaths take the total to 70,195.
- Queen Elizabeth II delivers her Christmas Message, telling people struggling without friends and family on Christmas Day that they "are not alone".
- The United States becomes the latest country to impose travel restrictions on the UK because of the new strain of COVID; any passengers going to the US must produce a negative COVID test before being allowed to travel.

==== 26 December ====
- Following a brief relaxation of rules for Christmas Day, tougher COVID restrictions are imposed on large parts of the UK, with more areas of England entering tier four restrictions, level four measures for mainland Scotland, and lockdowns for Wales and Northern Ireland. The restrictions mean that many shops are forced to remain closed, something that is expected to have a negative impact on the Boxing Day sales.
- In the first trial of its kind held by University College London Hospitals, ten people who have been in close contact with a person testing positive for COVID-19 have been given antibodies as a form of emergency protection.

==== 27 December ====
- Speaking to The Sunday Times, Pascal Soriot, chief executive of AstraZeneca, says they have found a "winning formula" with the Oxford–AstraZeneca COVID-19 vaccine. Sources, including ITV News report that the vaccine will be approved for use in the UK within days.
- The B117 strain of COVID, the presence of which was first detected in the UK, has now been identified in a number of other countries, including Australia.

==== 28 December ====
- A further 41,385 COVID cases are recorded in the UK, while officials express concern for the pressure on the health service in England, where 20,426 people are being treated in hospital for the virus.
- More than 200 British tourists have fled the Swiss ski resort of Verbier after Switzerland imposed a retrospective ten day quarantine backdated to 14 December because of the B117 strain of COVID.

==== 29 December ====
- A further 53,135 new COVID-19 cases are confirmed, the largest daily number so far as the figures catch up with data that went unreported over Christmas.
- Margaret Keenan, who was the first person in the UK to receive a dose of the Pfizer/BioNTech vaccine, returns to hospital for her follow-up injection, meaning she has completed the vaccination process.

==== 30 December ====
- The regulator (MHRA) is the first to approve the Oxford–AstraZeneca COVID-19 vaccine, meaning it is the second vaccine to enter the national rollout.
- Tier four measures are extended to more parts of England from midnight, with the Midlands, North East, parts of the North West and South West joining London and the South East in the toughest restrictions.
- The 2021 New Year Honours are published, recognising several hundred people for their work during the COVID crisis.

==== 31 December ====
- A further 55,892 new COVID-19 cases are confirmed, the largest daily number so far.
- As more areas of England enter tier four restrictions, a total of 44 million people are now living under the toughest measures.
- Health Secretary Matt Hancock warns people not to gather for New Year's Eve celebrations.
- The British Medical Association criticises the decision to change the length of time between the first and second shots of COVID vaccines from three to twelve weeks. The decision is defended by the UK's chief medial officers, who argue it "is much more preferable" to vaccinate a greater number of people with the first dose, which will give them protection against the virus.
- Analysts say that 2020 has been the worst year for high street retailers for more than 25 years, with 180.000 jobs lost in the sector.

== See also ==
- Timeline of the COVID-19 pandemic in the United Kingdom (January–June 2020)
- Timeline of the COVID-19 pandemic in the United Kingdom (January–June 2021)
- Timeline of the COVID-19 pandemic in the United Kingdom (July–December 2021)
- Timeline of the COVID-19 pandemic in the United Kingdom (January–June 2022)
- Timeline of the COVID-19 pandemic in the United Kingdom (July–December 2022)
- Timeline of the COVID-19 pandemic in the United Kingdom (2023)
- Timeline of the COVID-19 pandemic in the United Kingdom (2024)
- Timeline of the COVID-19 pandemic in England (2020)
- Timeline of the COVID-19 pandemic in Scotland (2020)
- Timeline of the COVID-19 pandemic in Wales (2020)
- Timeline of the COVID-19 pandemic in Northern Ireland (2020)
- History of the COVID-19 pandemic in the United Kingdom
- COVID-19 vaccination programme in the United Kingdom
