= Bordeaux Harbour =

Coordinates: 49.490°N 2.507°W

for other uses, see Port of Bordeaux (France)

Bordeaux Harbour is a fishing port and bay in the parish of Vale in the northeast of Guernsey, about 2 miles (3.2 km) north of Saint Peter Port. The harbour is now used primarily as a beach, which is flat and low, "with stretches of fine sand and groups of boulders".

== Landmarks ==
Vale Castle, first mentioned in the early sixteenth century, overlooks the bay, and the Bordeaux Kiosk is nearby. There is cromlech of note near the harbour, known as "L'Autel de Dehus" (altar of the devil). It has been described as "consisting of two immense flat stones lying north-east and south-west, inclining towards the former direction, and supported by a number of smaller ones". The harbour area is also noted for its birdlife, and attracts zoologists.

== Quarry ==
A quarry of the same name as the harbour was operated close to the port for over 100 years, and allegedly produced 3.5 million tons of blue diorite over the years. It was damaged during World War II, when it was flooded with water and silt, and despite a restoration in the post-War period it later closed.

Just off the bay are the Houmets islets, mentioned by Victor Hugo who described Les Houmets, in his work The Toilers of the Sea (Les Travailleurs de la mer).

A small battery built in the 18th-century existed at Bordeaux until all trace of the site vanished due to quarrying.
