= Vale Earth Fair =

The Vale Earth Fair is an annual festival held on the Channel Island of Guernsey that promotes music and the arts, and is the longest running such festival in the Channel Islands. Launched in 1976, the festival takes place each year at Vale Castle, and is organised by a group of volunteers. Profits from the event are donated to charity, and also used towards staging the festival. Charities that have benefitted from the Vale Castle Fair event include Free Tibet, the Burma Campaign UK and Safer Guernsey.

The 2020 event was unusual in that it went ahead with a live audience despite the COVID-19 pandemic. The island of Guernsey had been COVID free since 27 May 2020, allowing the event to admit attendees. 3,500 people attended the festival on 30 August, which featured a lineup exclusively made up of performers from Guernsey.
