= Vale Castle, Guernsey =

Protected building in Gurnsey

Coordinates: 49°29′6.5″N 2°30′32.9″W

- Château de Valle

Site information
- Type: Norman castle

Vale Castle, is a protected building located in the Vale, Guernsey. The original name was "Le Château St Michel", later it became "Château de Val" or "Château de Valle" and is over 1,000 years old. It defends both St. Sampson's harbour at the eastern end of the Braye du Valle, Guernsey, and Bordeaux Harbour.

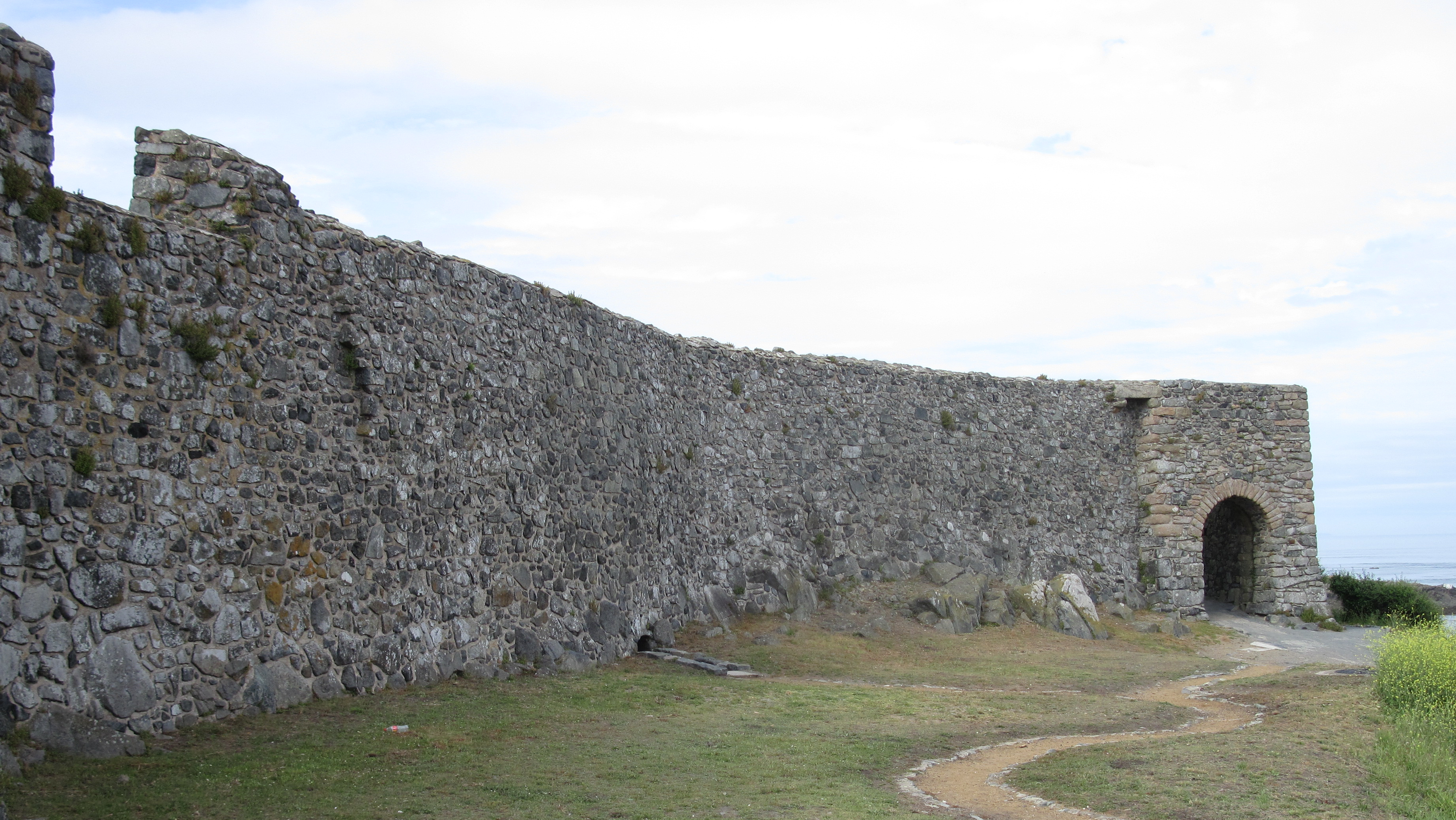
Vale Castle curtain wall and gateway

== History ==
A tidal passage separated the north of Guernsey from the rest of Guernsey. Earthworks dating from 500 to 600 BC, comprising a double ditch and bank, indicate that an Iron Age fort existed on the hill where Vale Castle now sits.

=== Middle ages ===
Around A.D. 968, monks from the Benedictine monastery of Mont Saint-Michel, came to Guernsey to establish the Abbey of St Michael, a community in the north of the island.

According to tradition, Robert II, Duke of Normandy (the father of William the Conqueror), was journeying to England in 1032 to help Edward the Confessor. He was obliged to take shelter in Guernsey and gave land, now known as the Clos du Valle, to the monks.

In 1061, when pirates attacked and pillaged the island, a complaint was made to Duke William. He sent over Sampson D'Anneville, who succeeded, with the aid of the monks, in driving the pirates out. For this service, Sampson D'Anneville and the monks were rewarded with a grant of half the island between them. The portion going to the monastery, known as Le Fief St Michel, included the land where the castle is located. The castle of Saint Michael (now Vale Castle), was constructed to protect the population against pirates by providing a safe refuge.

It is not possible to identify when the medieval works were started, possibly in the late 10th century. During the English Channel naval campaign (1338–1339), the French captured the island and then the castle, where they put its defenders to death. The occupying forces withdrew in 1340 after the Battle of Sluys crippled the French navy.

In 1372 Owain Lawgoch, a claimant to the Welsh throne, led a free company on behalf of France in an attack on Guernsey. The assault was popularly called “La Descente des Aragousais”. Owain Lawgoch withdrew after killing 400 of the island militia, The poem of the same name refers to the castle as the Château de l'Archange, the location of the last ditch stand against the insurgents.

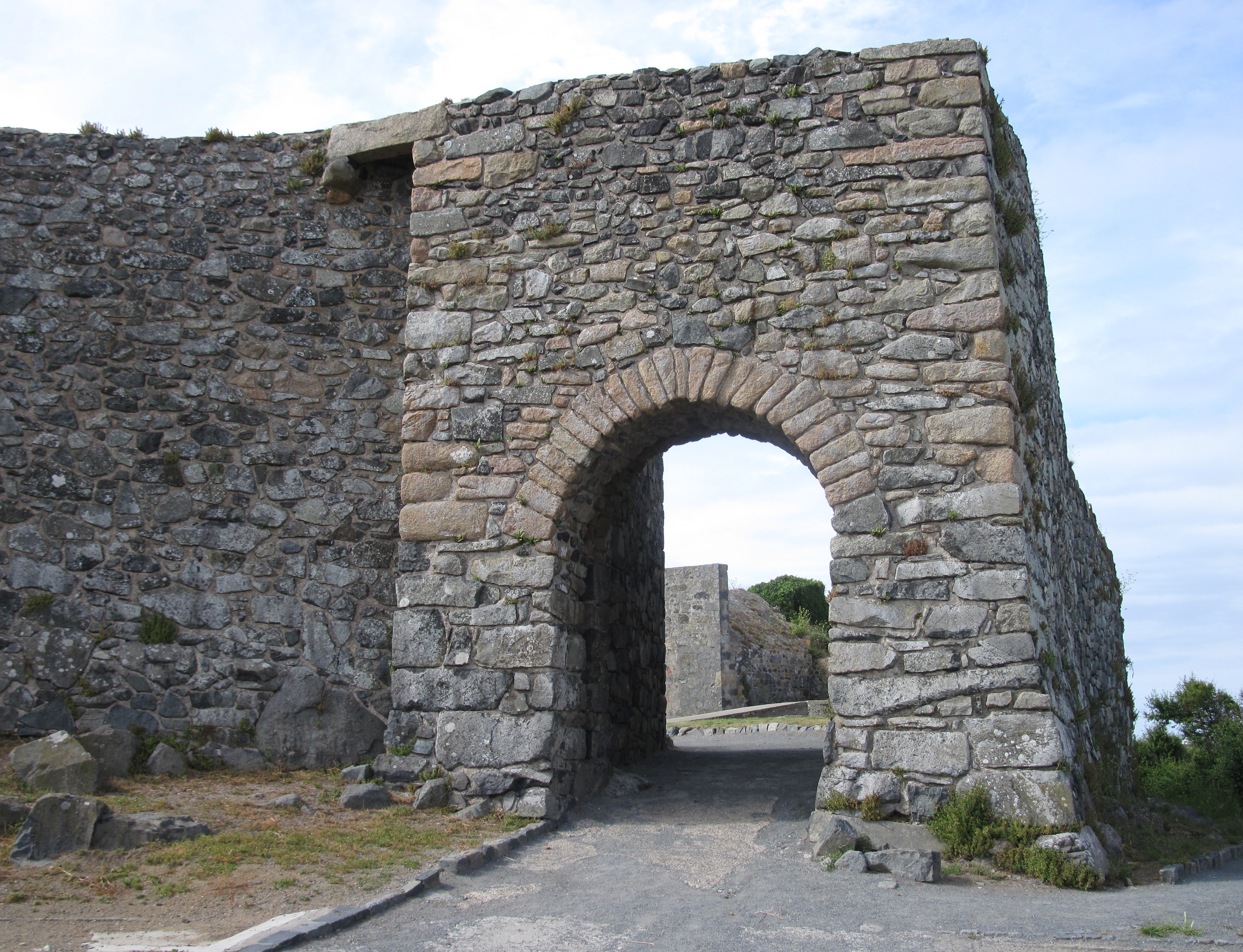
Vale Castle 15th-century gatehouse

=== Early modern period ===
Granite curtain walls and a gatehouse were added in the 15th century, with other repairs and improvements to walls and installing buttresses being made over the next century. A powder house, guardroom, and houses for the garrison were added around this time. The castle has a well. In 1615 it was the requirement of the island to maintain the Vale castle, as against the Crown which maintained Castle Cornet.

During the nine years of the English Civil War, Parliamentarian troops may have been stationed in Vale Castle as Castle Cornet supported the Royalist cause whilst the Island of Guernsey supported the Parliamentarian cause. Extensive repairs were recommended in 1680.

=== Late modern period ===
The American Revolutionary War, which made France an enemy, resulted in barracks and other improvements being added. The French Revolution was also a threat to the island and the castle received one 24-pounder and two 9-pounder cannons.

The Castle was fitted with a signal mast to alert the island to the approach of any vessel, with a fire beacon to give alarm at night.

In 1799, 6,000 Russian troops were quartered at nearby Delancey. Hundreds died of disease and graves of Russian soldiers are located at the Vale Castle.

During the Napoleonic Wars the reclaiming of Braye du Valle in 1806-8 saw the end of the separation of Le Clos du Valle, previously a tidal island, which improved the ability to move troops and better protect the island. The nearby port of St Sampson was expanded with additional trade through the harbor.

During World War I the local militia had a small garrison in the castle and between the wars the barracks were used by the States as homes.

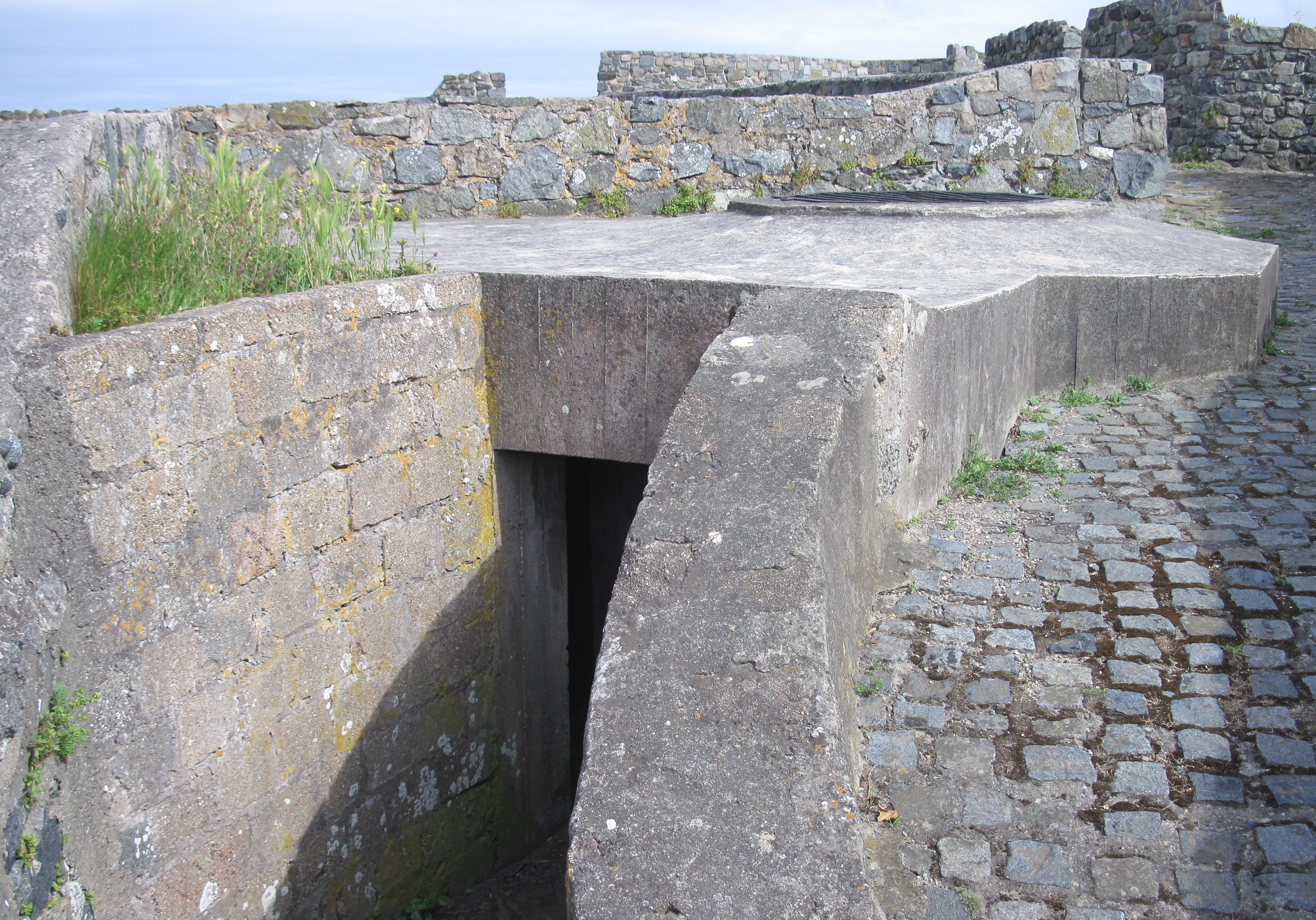
German mortar pit

The last modifications to the castle were the work of Organisation Todt workers in 1942–4 on behalf of the German occupiers. They demolished the barracks and built four concrete machine-gun positions, three 5 cm mortar positions, trenches, four tobruk pits, and personnel shelters. The defences in Stützpunktgruppe Talfeste also featured flame throwers, two 60 cm searchlight positions, and two 10.5cm K331(f) field guns.

== Design ==
The Castle is of irregular plan on a hill. It is roughly built with six rounded towers connected with curtain walls and a square gatehouse.

The coast is on the south and east and to the west was low lying marsh.

== Archaeology ==
Under the medieval outer bank was a small turf bank which contained pottery dating to 500-600 BC with similar pottery found in a second bank under the 14th Century military buildings inside the walls. This hillfort, with its double-bank, is unique in Guernsey.

Large excavations took place in 1980. These indicated that the original construction date for the late medieval works was around 1370–1400.

== Protection ==
The whole of the Chateau de Marais was listed as a Protected Monument on 26 March 1938, reference PM124.

== The arts ==
- Francis Grose (1731-1791) created a copper engraved print St.Michael's, or the Vale Castle, 1786 and St. Sampson's Church 1777 with the Vale Castle in the background
- Robert Mudie (1777-1842) Print published in Historical and Topographical Description of the Channel Islands 1840
- Joseph Mallord William Turner (1775-1851) sketched the Castle.
- Victor Hugo (1802-1885) mentions the Vale Castle in his 1866 book Toilers of the Sea
- Edwin Hayes, R.H.A., R.I., R.O.I. (1819-1904), painted Vale Castle/Guernsey E Hayes Buscoe House/Stedes Rd

== Access and current use ==
Vale Castle is open to the public. It accessible on foot with entry free of charge except on days when private events are staged. Free parking is available at Bordeaux or off Castle Road.

The castle is becoming popular for music festivals and private parties. The Vale Earth Fair has been held in the Castle for over 40 years.

The public can walk through the German era trenches and view Tobruk pits, MG positions and a personnel shelter.

== Gallery ==
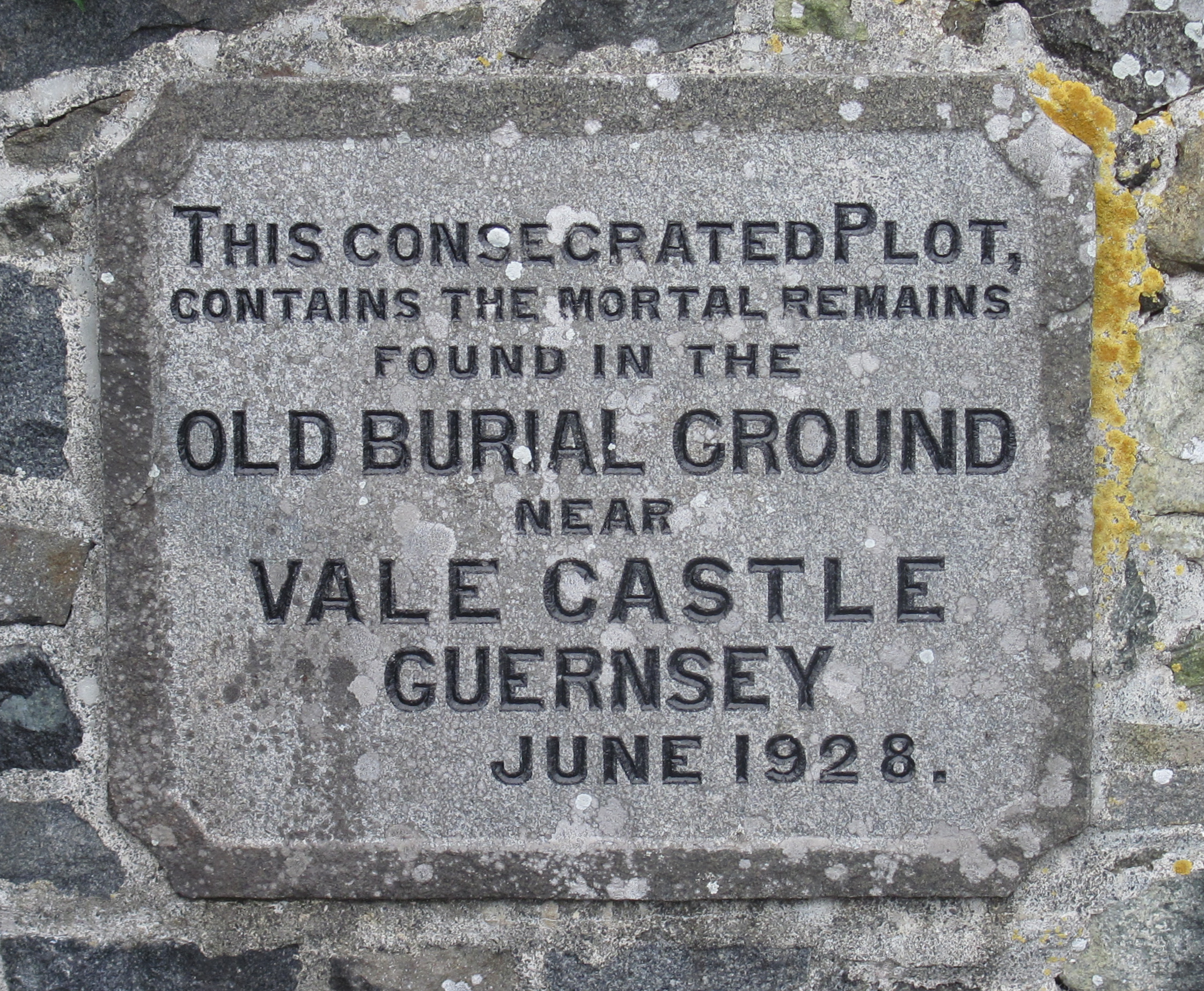
Burial ground Vale Castle

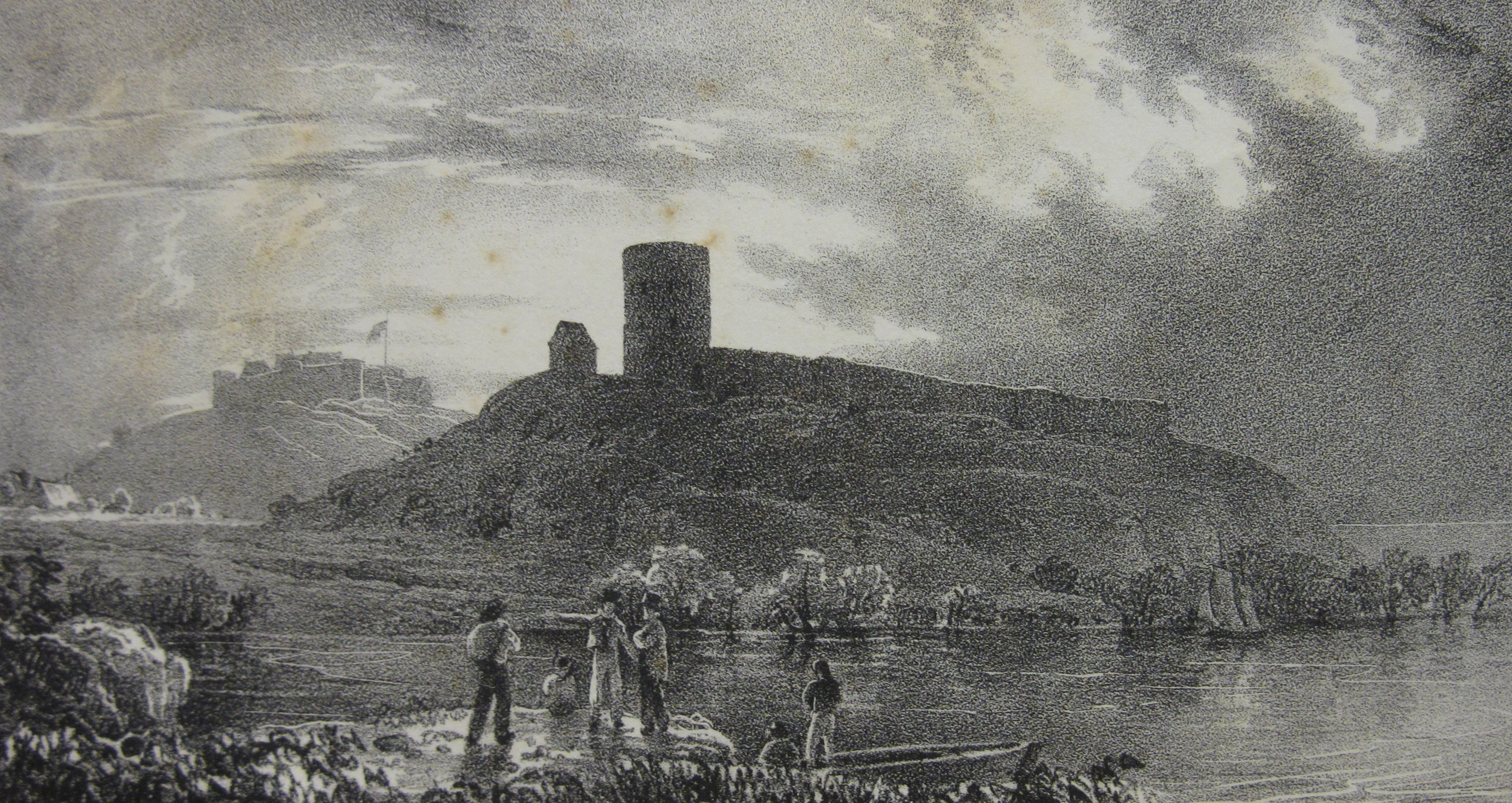
1826 Mont Crevelt with the Vale Castle in the background

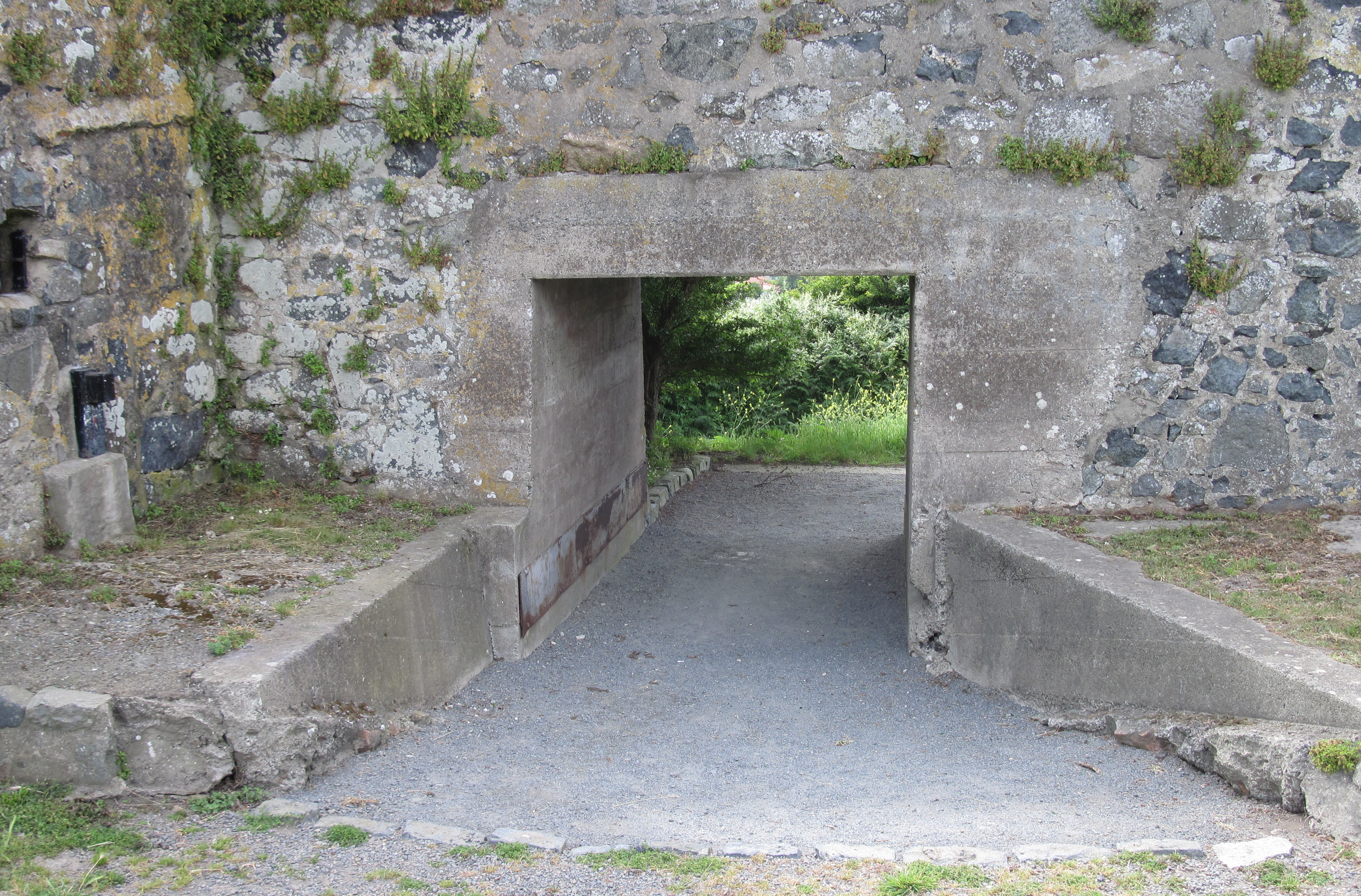
German searchlight passage

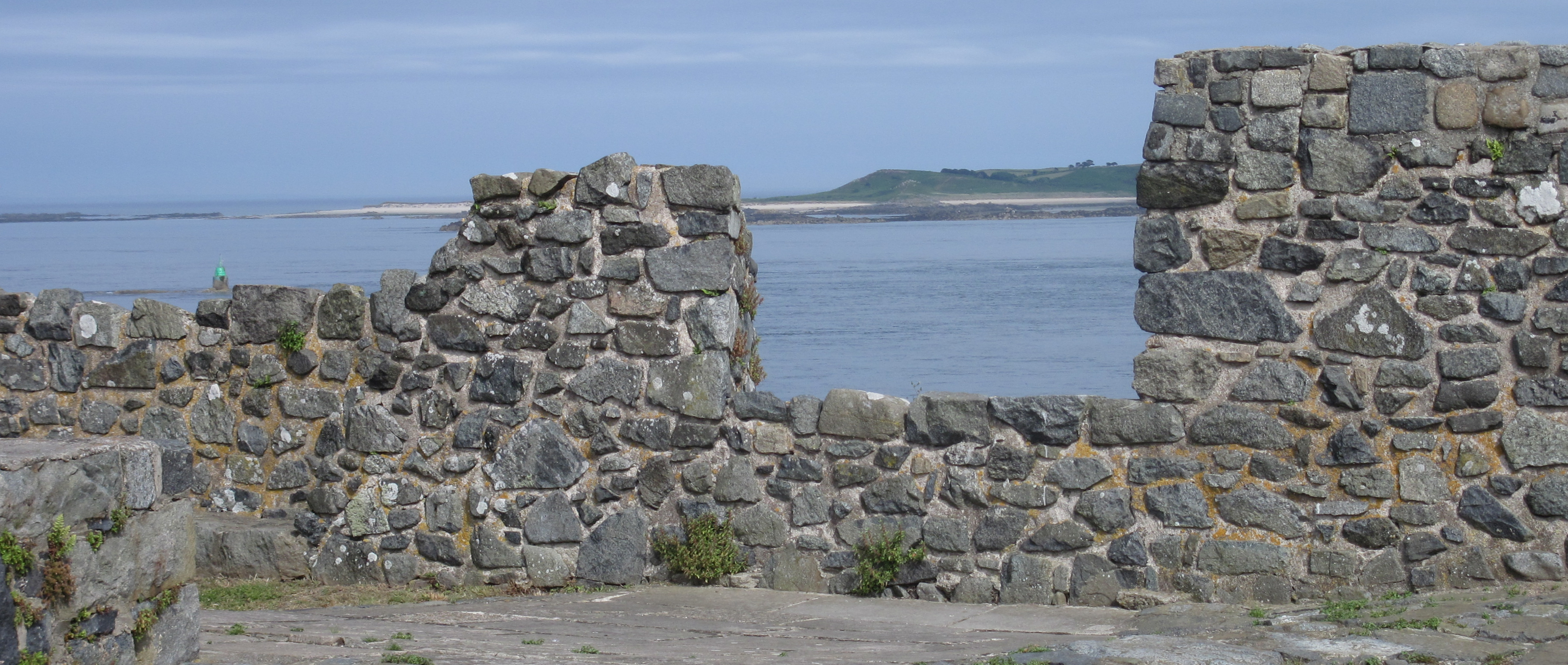
German field gun position

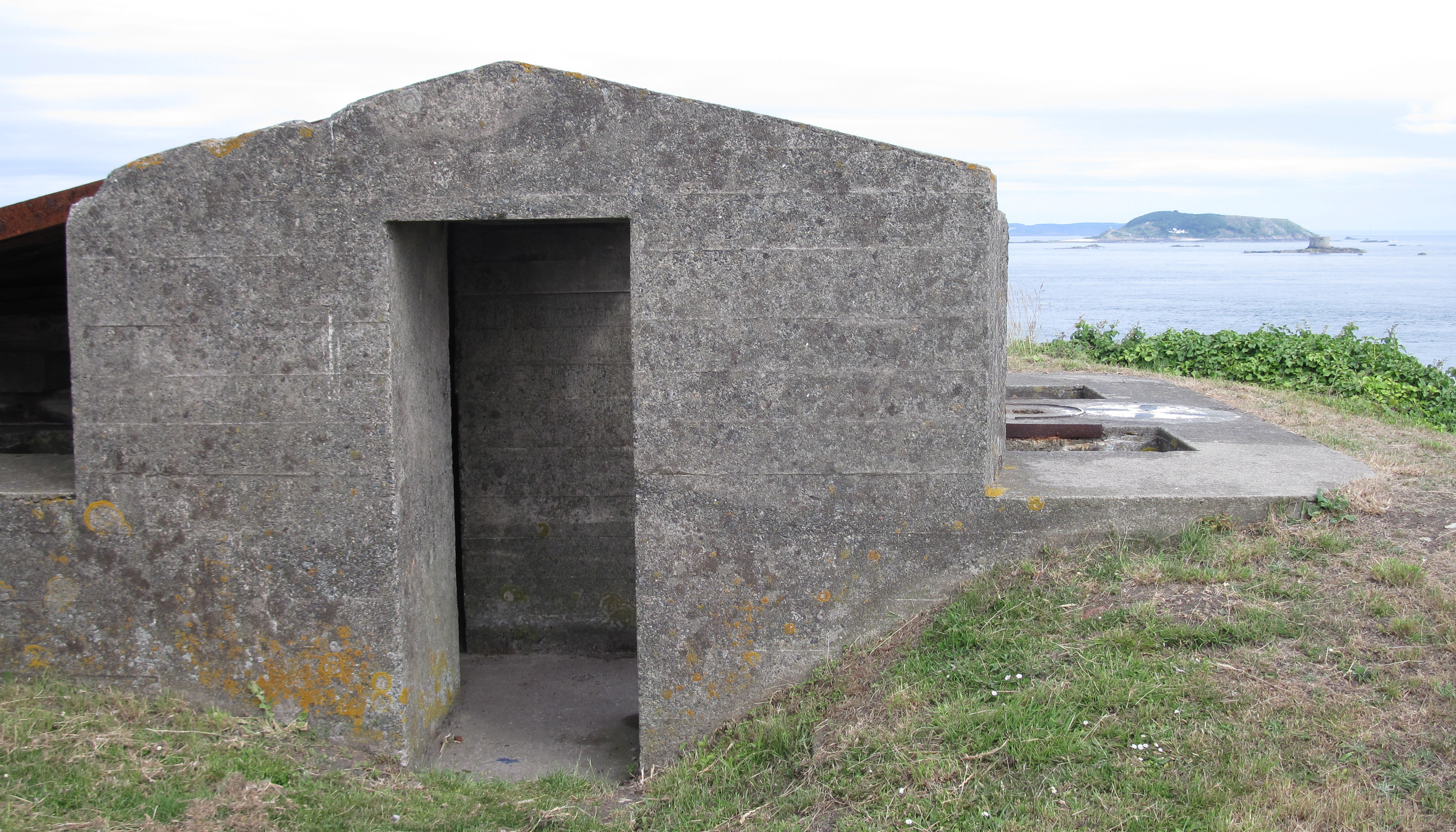
German heavy machine gun position

== See also ==
- Fortifications of Guernsey
