= History of the COVID-19 pandemic in the United Kingdom =

Graph showing the number of COVID-19 cases and deaths in the United Kingdom, logarithmic scale on y-axis

This article outlines the history of the COVID-19 pandemic in the United Kingdom (granular timelines can be found here). Though later reporting indicated that there may have been some cases dating from late 2019, COVID-19 was confirmed to be spreading in the UK by the end of January 2020. The country was initially relatively slow implementing restrictions but a legally enforced stay-at-home order had been introduced by late March. Restrictions were steadily eased across the UK in late spring and early summer that year.

By the Autumn, COVID-19 cases were again rising. This led to the creation of new regulations along with the introduction of the concept of a local lockdown, a variance in restrictions in a more specific geographic location than the four nations of the UK. Lockdowns took place in Wales, England and Northern Ireland later that season. In part due to a new variant of the virus, cases were still increasing and the NHS had come under severe strain by late December. This led to a tightening of restrictions across the UK.

The first COVID-19 vaccine was approved and began its rollout in the UK in early December. 15 million vaccine doses had been given to predominantly those most vulnerable to the virus by mid-February. 6 months later more than 75% of adults in the UK were fully vaccinated against COVID-19. Restrictions began to ease from late February onwards and almost all had ended in Great Britain by August. The SARS-CoV-2 Delta variant drove an increase in daily case numbers that remained high through autumn, although the vaccination programme led to a lower mortality rate. The SARS-CoV-2 Omicron variant arrived in early December, driving a further increase in cases.

== Winter 2019–20: Arrival and embedment ==
=== September 2019 – January 2020: Suspected cases ===
In November 2019, Connor Reed, of Llandudno, a 25-year-old student working at a school in Wuhan caught the virus; on 4 / 5 December he was taken to the local hospital. After his recovery, he acknowledged the Chinese authorities for their openness in terms of information. A year later, after returning to Wales, he was found dead at his flat in Bangor University, as the result of an accident.

In March 2020, it was reported that a 50-year-old man from East Sussex fell ill, also with COVID-19 symptoms, on 20 January after he returned from Ischgl in Austria, which is under investigation because it failed to report early cases on February. Also, the three other members of his family and two friends from Denmark and one from Minnesota, US had same symptoms.

In May 2020, the BBC reported that several members of a choir in Yorkshire had suffered COVID-19-like symptoms shortly after the partner of one of the choir members returned from a business trip to Wuhan, China, on 17 or 18 December.

In June 2020, the BBC reported that it was found that COVID-19 in UK had at least 1356 origins, mostly from Italy (late February), Spain (early-to-mid-March), and France (mid-to-late-March). Later that same month, Xinhua, the official Chinese state-owned news agency, reported that 53-year-old woman who fell ill on 6 January, two days after returning from a family trip to the Obergurgl resort in Austria, tested positive for antibodies for SARS-CoV-2 in late May. The agency reported that no other member of her family fell ill.

In August 2020, the Kent coroner certified that the death of Peter Attwood (aged 84) on 30 January had been related to COVID-19 ('COVID-19 infection and bronchopneumonia', according to an email on 3 September, after COVID-19 was detected in his lung tissue), making him the first confirmed UK victim of the disease. He first showed symptoms on 15 December 2019. Attwood had not travelled abroad.

In November 2020, it was reported that a 66-year-old had experienced symptoms shortly after returning from a holiday in Italy in September 2019, and his 44-year-old daughter had experienced similar symptoms. Scientists had previously speculated about COVID-19 in Italy as early as September 2019.

=== January 2020: First confirmed cases ===
On 22 January, following a confirmed case of COVID-19 in the United States the previous day, in a man returning to Washington from Wuhan, China, where there were 440 confirmed cases at the time, the DHSC and Public Health England (PHE) raised the risk level from "very low" to "low". As a result, Heathrow Airport received additional clinical support and tightened surveillance of the three direct flights from Wuhan every week; each was to be met by a Port Health team with Mandarin and Cantonese language support. In addition, all airports in the UK were to make written guidance available for unwell travellers. Simultaneously, efforts to trace 2,000 people who had flown into the UK from Wuhan over the previous 14 days were made.

On 31 January, the first UK cases were confirmed in York. On the same day, British nationals were evacuated from Wuhan to quarantine at Arrowe Park Hospital. However, due to confusion over eligibility, some people missed the flight.

=== February 2020: Early spread ===
On 6 February, a third confirmed case was reported in Brighton – a man who returned from Singapore and France to the UK on 28 January. Following confirmation of his result, the UK's CMOs expanded the number of countries where a history of previous travel associated with flu-like symptoms—such as fever, cough, and difficulty breathing—in the previous 14 days would require self-isolation and calling NHS 111. These countries included China, Hong Kong, Japan, Macau, Malaysia, Republic of Korea, Singapore, Taiwan, and Thailand.

On 23 February, the DHSC confirmed four new cases from the Diamond Princess cruise ship.

A Nike conference on 26–27 February in Edinburgh led to at least 25 cases, including 8 residents of Scotland. Health Protection Scotland established an incident management team at the time and traced contacts from delegates. A report by Glasgow University on genomic epidemiology and the conference concluded this did not lead to further spread of the virus.

On 27 February, the first cases were confirmed in Northern Ireland.

On 28 February, the first case was confirmed in Wales, and a passenger on the Diamond Princess became the first Briton to die from the virus.

== Spring 2020: First wave ==
=== March 2020: Closures and restrictions ===
The government initially pursued limited societal measures unlike many other countries, but slowly changed strategy as scientific modelling indicated tougher restrictions would be needed to avoid a high death toll. Analysts believed that significant numbers of lives may have been saved had lockdown begun earlier.

==== Early to mid-March: closures and cancellations ====
On 1 March, a further 13 cases were reported including new cases in Greater Manchester; bringing the total to 36, three of which were believed to be contacts of the case in Surrey who had no history of travel abroad. First case of the virus reported in Scotland.

On 3 March, the UK Government unveiled their Coronavirus Action Plan, which outlined what the UK had done and what it planned to do next. Paul Cosford, a medical director at Public Health England, said widespread transmission of COVID-19 in the United Kingdom was "highly likely".

On 5 March, the first death from COVID-19 (within the UK), a woman in her 70s, was reported in Reading, and the second, a man in his 80s in Milton Keynes, was reported to have died later that day.

On 12 March, the total of cases in the UK was reported to be 590. On the same day, the UK CMOs raised the risk to the UK from moderate to high. The government advised that anyone with a new continuous cough or a fever should self-isolate for seven days. Schools were asked to cancel trips abroad, and people over 70 and those with pre-existing medical conditions were advised to avoid cruises.

Large sporting and cultural events continued in the UK into March. Cheltenham Festival took place from 10 to 12 March, attended by 150,000 people, as did a knockout match of the UEFA Champions League in Liverpool. Subsequent research by COVID Symptom Study suggested this increased the spread of COVID-19 infections. On 14 and 15 March Stereophonics and Lewis Capaldi performed indoor concerts in Aberdeen and Cardiff, respectively.

On 13 March, the 2020 United Kingdom local elections were postponed for a year.

On 16 March, Prime Minister Boris Johnson advised everyone in the UK against "non-essential" travel and contact with others, as well as suggesting people should avoid visiting pubs, clubs or theatres, and work from home if possible. Pregnant women, people over 70 and those with certain health conditions were urged to consider the advice "particularly important", and would be asked to self-isolate within days. On the same day, a second MP, Kate Osborne, tested positive after a period of self-isolation.

On 17 March, NHS England announced that all non-urgent operations in England would be postponed from 15 April to free up 30,000 beds. General practice moved rapidly to remote working. In March 2020 the proportion of telephone appointments increased by over 600%. Also, the government provided a £3.2million emergency support package to help rough sleepers into accommodation. With complex physical and mental health needs, in general, homeless people are at a significant risk of catching the virus.

On 18 March, the UK announced schools would close at the end of Friday 20 March. First to announce was Welsh minister for education Kirsty Williams, this was followed closely by a similar announcement for Scottish schools by Nicola Sturgeon. Arlene Foster and Michelle O’Neill jointly followed suit for Northern Ireland schools. Later the same day, Boris Johnson announced that schools in England would also close. He also announced that public examinations would not take place as a result.

On 19 March, the UK Government downgraded the status of COVID-19 from a "high consequence infectious disease" (HCID) after consideration by the UK HCID group and the Advisory Committee on Dangerous Pathogens.

On the same day, Boris Johnson, UK Prime Minister said "I do think, looking at it all, that we can turn the tide within the next 12 weeks, and I am absolutely confident that we can send coronavirus packing in this country but only if we take the steps, we all take the steps we have outlined."

On 20 March, the government announced the closure of public venues, such as pubs, restaurants, gyms, leisure centres, nightclubs, theatres and cinemas. The chancellor, Rishi Sunak also announced that the government would cover 80% of the salaries of retained workers until restrictions were over.

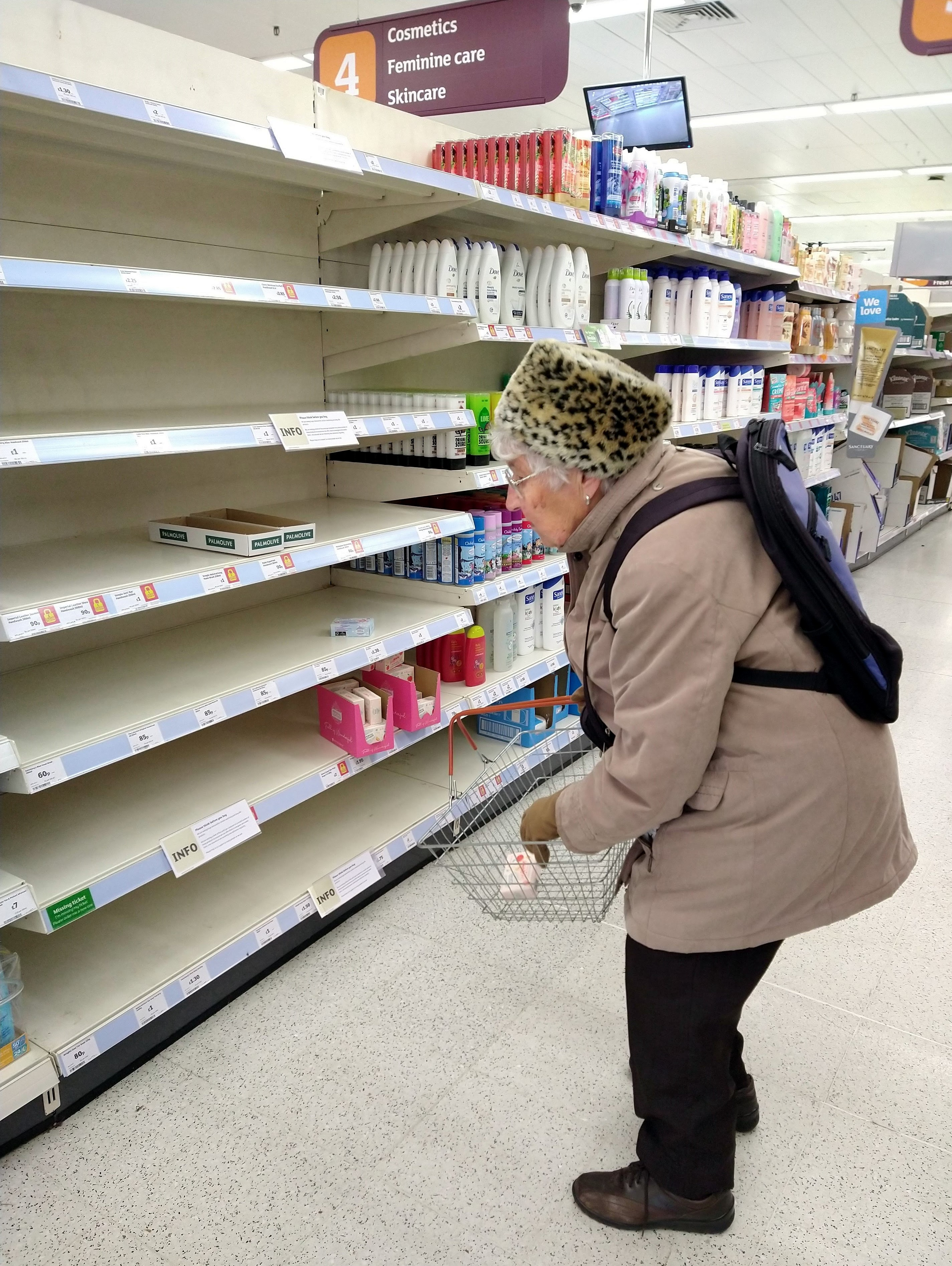
Soap almost sold out, London, 12 March.

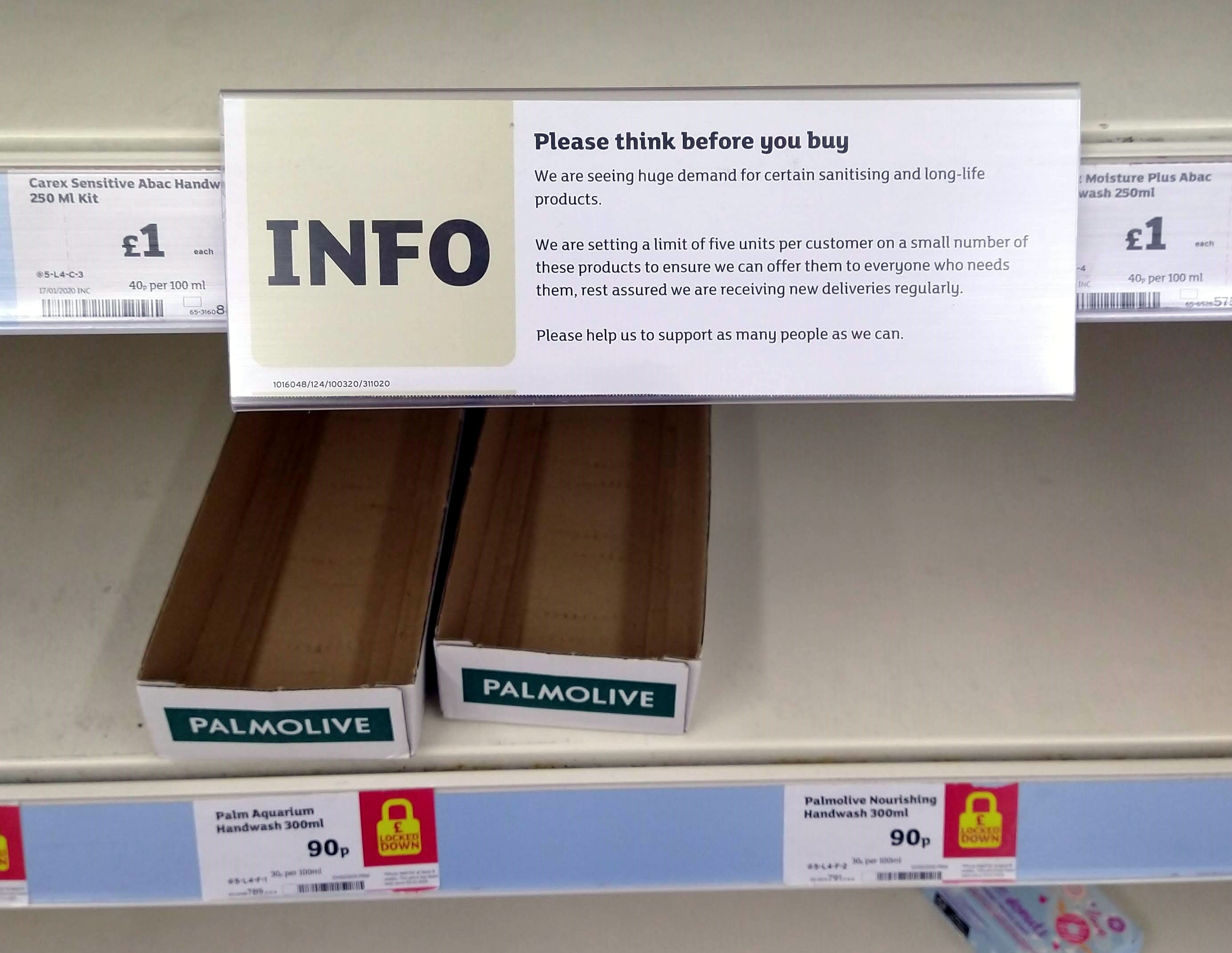
Some supermarkets began to limit purchases of items in high demand, London, 12 March.

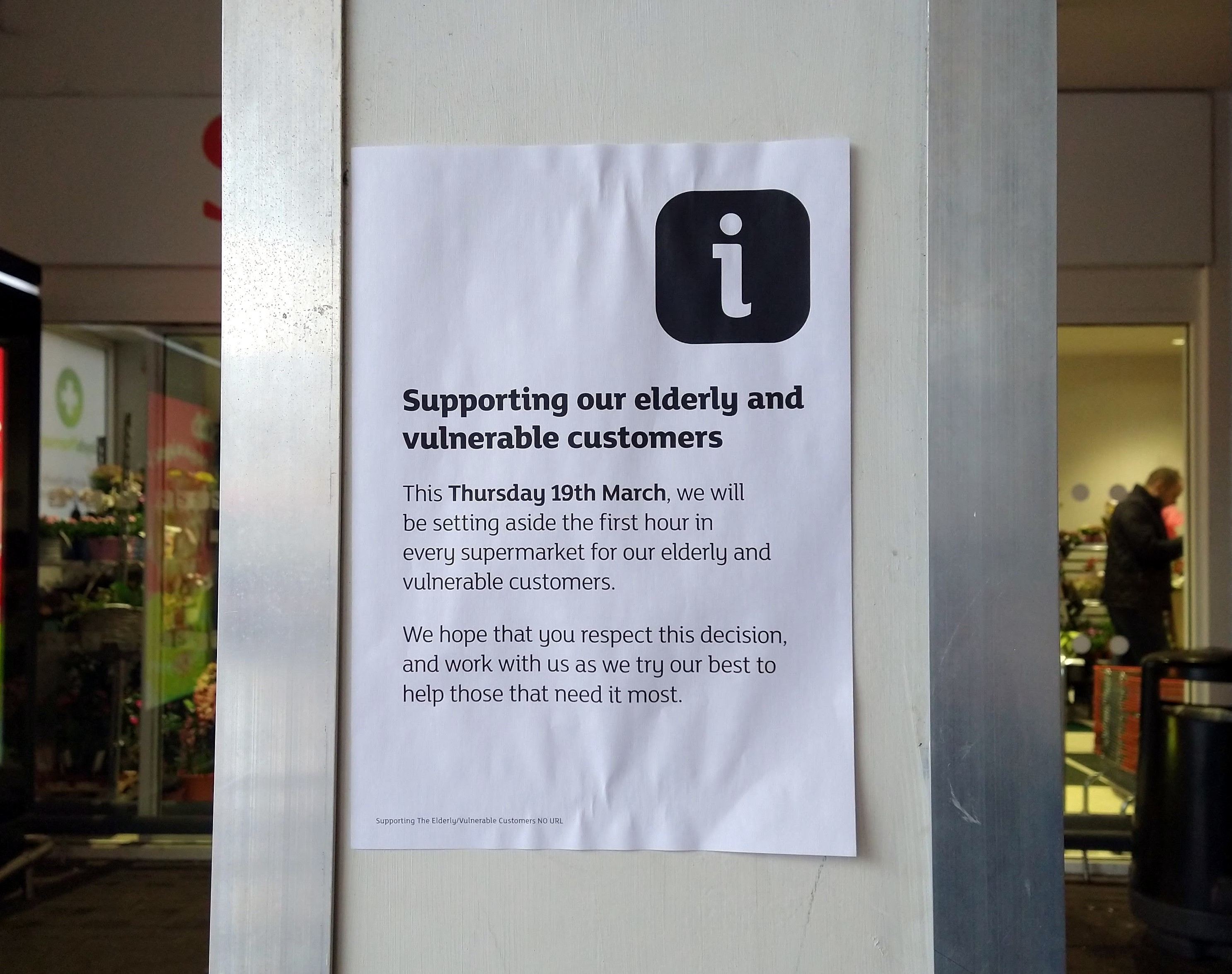
Supermarkets introduced early shopping hours for the elderly and vulnerable, London, 19 March.

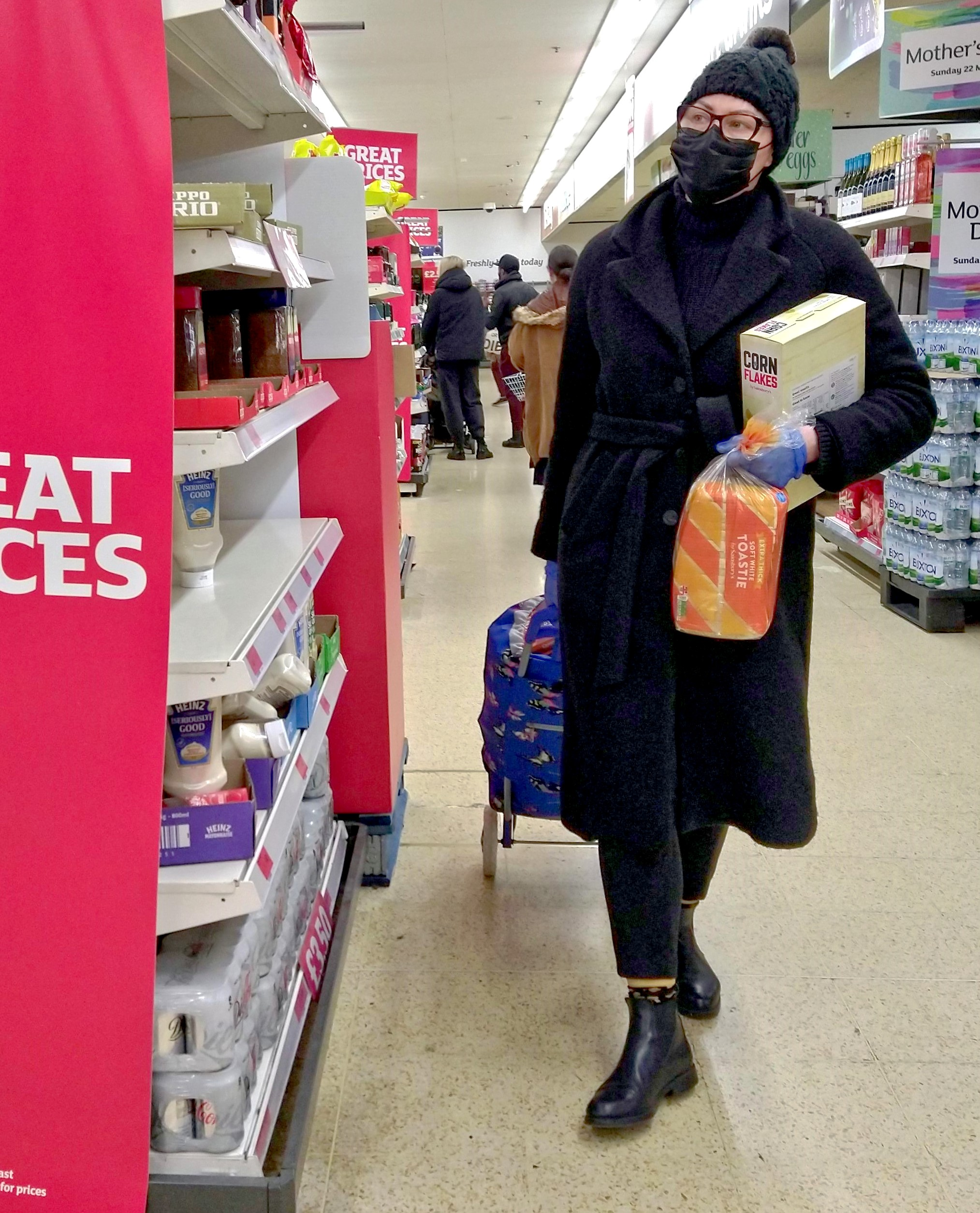
Shopping in gloves and a face mask, London, 15 March.

==== Late March: Restrictions begin ====
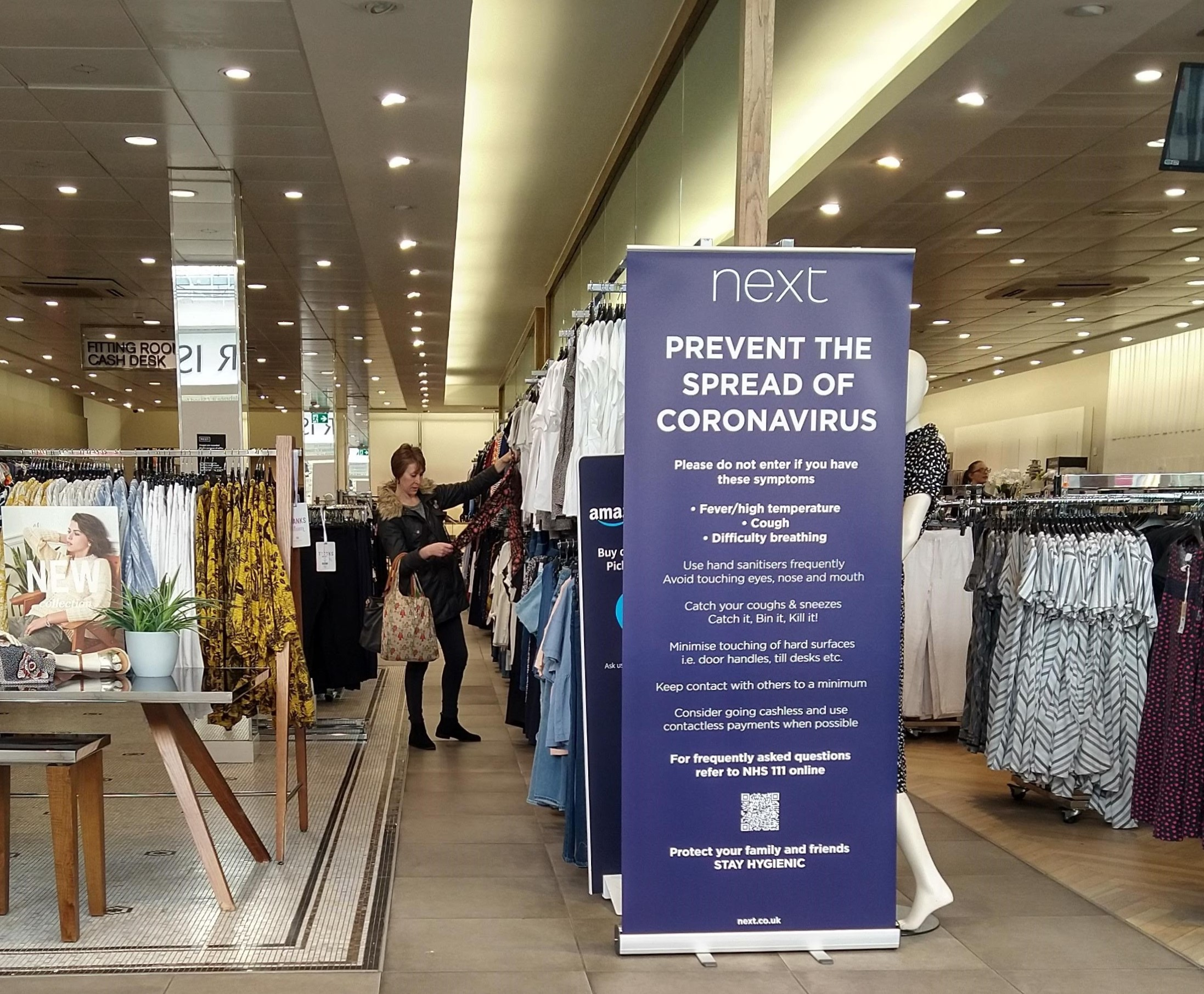
Next closed its 700 stores on 23 March, having previously traded with warning notices about the virus.

On 23 March, having previously advised the public to avoid pubs and restaurants, Boris Johnson announced in a television broadcast that measures to mitigate the virus were to be tightened to protect the NHS, with wide-ranging restrictions on freedom of movement, enforceable in law, under a stay-at-home order which would last for at least three weeks. The slogan "Stay home, Protect the NHS, Save Lives" was introduced, often seen in capital letters, on a yellow background, with a red border.

The government directed people to stay home throughout this period except for essential purchases, essential work travel (if remote work was not possible), medical needs, one exercise per day (alone or with household members), and providing care for others. Many other non-essential activities, including all public gatherings and social events except funerals, were prohibited, with many categories of retail businesses ordered to be closed.

Despite the announcement, the Health Protection (Coronavirus, Restrictions) (England) Regulations 2020, which made the sweeping restrictions legally enforceable, did not take effect until three days later on 26 March.

Operation Rescript and Operation Broadshare saw the deployment of the COVID Support Force, a military task force to support public services and civilian authorities in tackling the outbreak within the United Kingdom and overseas.

On 26 March, the number of UK COVID-19 deaths increased by more than 100 in a day for the first time, rising to 578, while a total of 11,568 had tested positive for the virus. At 8:00 pm that day, people from across the UK took part in applause in appreciation of health workers, later branded as Clap for Our Carers. This gesture was repeated on the next nine Thursdays, up to 28 May.

Later reporting in The Times suggested that during the UK's first wave, the anticipated burden on the health service led to hospitals prioritising infected people with a higher chance of survival for intensive care units, resulting in many elderly patients not receiving care despite their vulnerability.

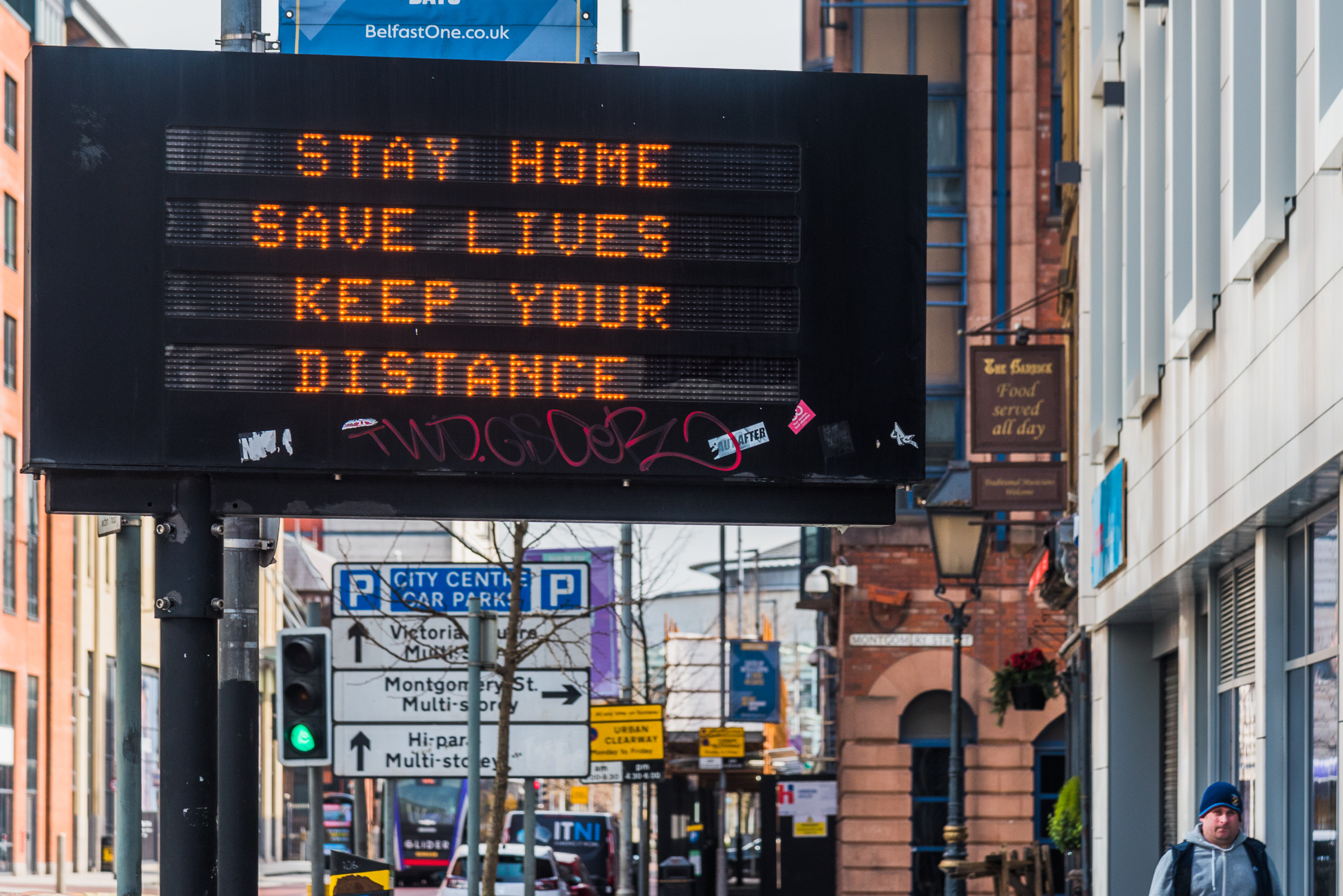
Electronic display sign normally used for traffic management displays COVID-19-related advice on an almost deserted Chichester Street in Belfast City Centre, 24 March 2020.

On 27 March 2020, Boris Johnson and Matt Hancock announced that they had tested positive for the virus. On the same day, Labour Party MP Angela Rayner, the Shadow Secretary of State for Education, confirmed she had been suffering symptoms and was self-isolating.

Chief Medical Adviser Chris Whitty also reported suffering from symptoms and would be self-isolating, while continuing to advise the UK government. That day also saw the largest increase in the number of deaths, with the figure rising by 181 from the previous day, bringing the total to 759, while 14,579 cases had been confirmed.

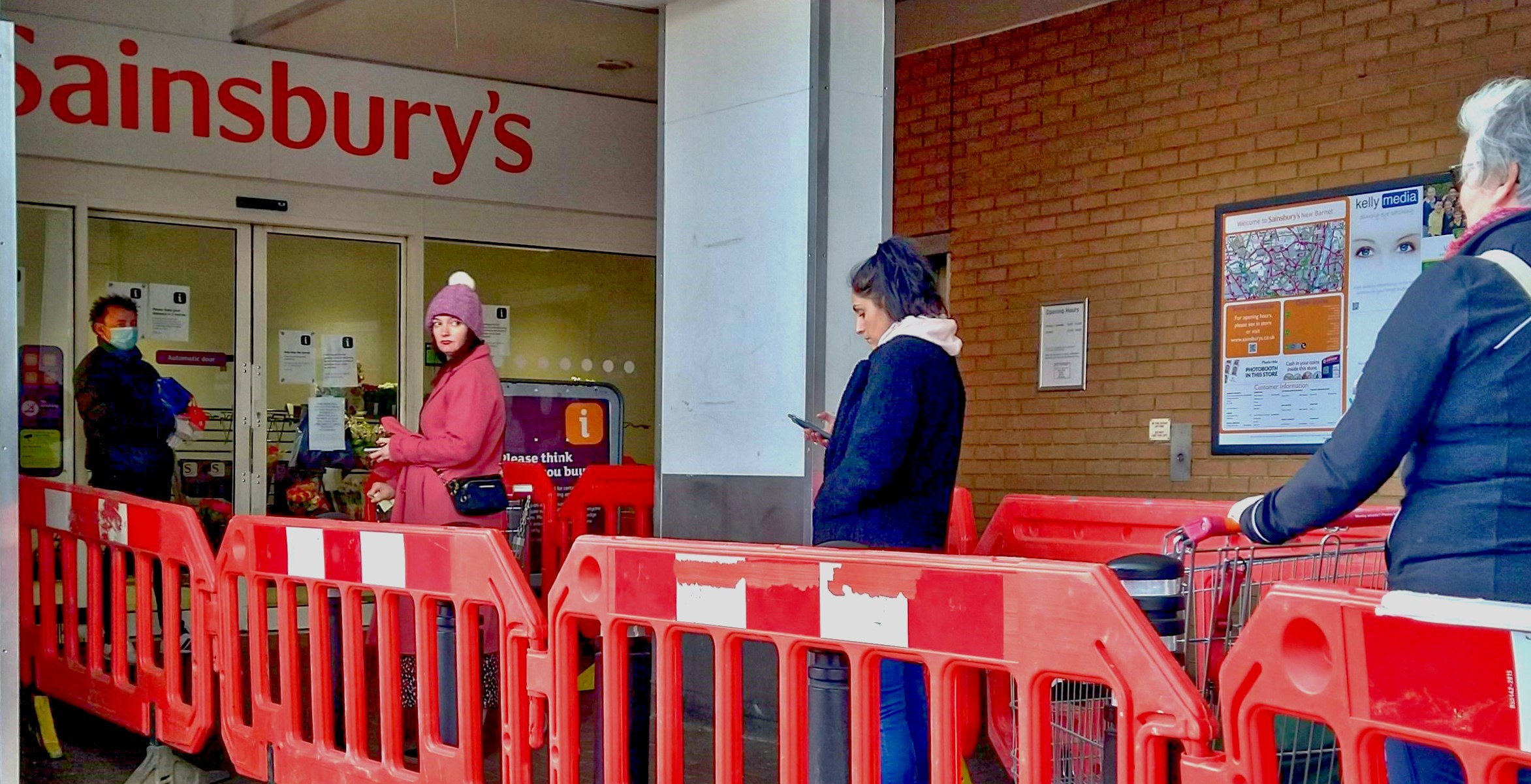
Social distancing while queueing to enter a Sainsbury's supermarket, 30 March 2020

On 29 March, it was reported that the government would send a letter to 30 million households warning things would "get worse before they get better" and that tighter restrictions could be implemented if necessary. The letter would also be accompanied by a leaflet setting out the government's lockdown rules along with health information. Dr Jenny Harries, England's deputy chief medical officer, suggested it could be six months before life could return to "normal", because social distancing measures would have to be reduced "gradually". The first NHS nurse died of COVID-19.

On 30 March, the Prime Minister's senior adviser Dominic Cummings was reported to be self-isolating after experiencing COVID-19 symptoms. He had been at Downing Street on 27 March and was stated to have developed symptoms over 28 and 29 March.

Also, transmission within the community was thought to be decreasing, and hospital admission data suggested cases were increasing at a slower rate. The Foreign and Commonwealth Office repatriated tens of thousands of British nationals who had been stranded abroad by the COVID-19 outbreak.

=== April 2020: Lockdown continues ===
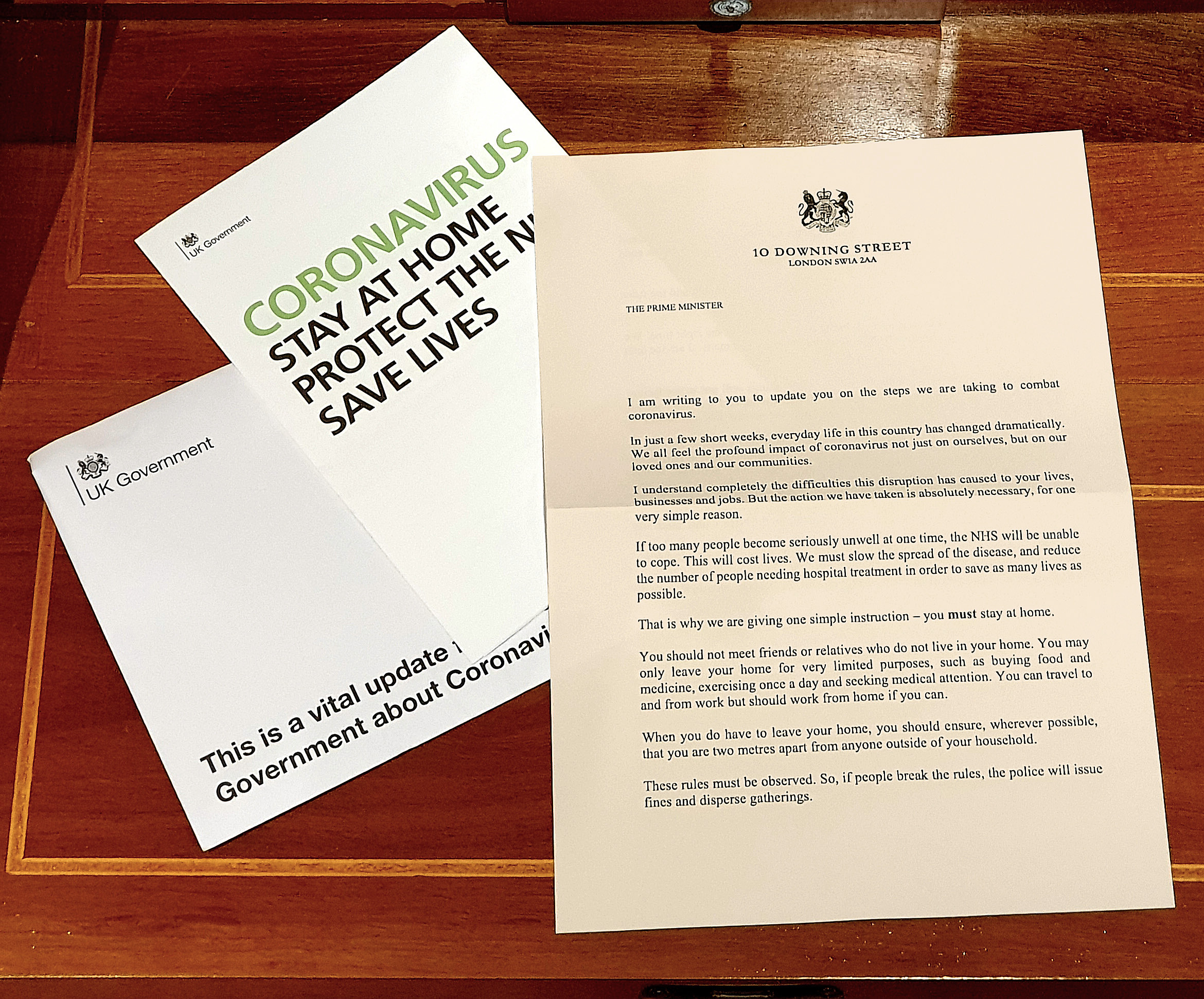
A letter from the Prime Minister to UK households accompanying government guidance on COVID-19, 3 April 2020

On 1 April, the government confirmed that a total of 2,000 NHS staff had been tested for COVID-19 since the outbreak began, but Cabinet Office Minister Michael Gove said a shortage of chemical reagents needed for COVID-19 testing meant it was not possible to screen the NHS's 1.2 million workforces. Gove's statement was contradicted by the Chemical Industries Association, which said there was not a shortage of the relevant chemicals and that at a meeting with a business minister the week before the government had not tried to find out about potential supply problems.

On 2 April, Health Secretary Matt Hancock, after his seven-day period of isolation, announced a "five pillar" plan for testing people for the virus, to conduct 100,000 tests a day by the end of April. The plan referred to ambitions to:

*scale up swab testing in PHE labs and NHS hospitals for those with a medical need and the most critical workers to 25,000 a day in England by mid to late April, with the aligned testing strategies of the NHS in the Devolved Administrations benefiting from PHE's partnership with Roche through a central UK allocation mechanism;

- deliver increased commercial swab testing for critical key workers in the NHS across the UK, before then expanding to key workers in other sectors;
- develop blood testing to help know if people across the UK have the right antibodies and so have high levels of immunity to coronavirus;
- conduct UK-wide surveillance testing to learn more about the spread of the disease and help develop new tests and treatments; and
- build a mass-testing capacity for the UK at a completely new scale.

On 4 April, Boris Johnson was admitted to hospital as a "precautionary measure" after suffering from symptoms for more than a week with no improvement. Catherine Calderwood, the Chief Medical Officer for Scotland, resigned from her post after it emerged she had been spoken to by police for visiting her second home during lockdown. On 6 April, Johnson was moved to the intensive care unit at St Thomas' Hospital in London as his symptoms worsened. First Secretary of State Dominic Raab assumed Johnson's duties.

On 5 April, the Queen of the United Kingdom addressed the Commonwealth in a televised broadcast, in which she asked people to "take comfort that while we may have more still to endure, better days will return". She added, "we will be with our friends again; we will be with our families again; we will meet again".

On 7 April the UK Government Chief Scientific Adviser, Sir Patrick Vallance, said that death figures were not accelerating as had been predicted but it was too early to tell whether the outbreak was peaking. On 9 April, the number of daily recorded deaths was 881, taking the total to 7,978. Dominic Raab said the UK was "starting to see the impact" of the restrictions but it was "too early" to lift them, and urged people to stay indoors over the Easter weekend.

On 10 April, the UK recorded another 980 deaths, taking the total to 8,958. Jonathan Van-Tam, England's deputy chief medical officer, told the UK Government's daily briefing the lockdown was "beginning to pay off" but the UK was still in a "dangerous situation", and although cases in London had started to drop they were still rising in Yorkshire and the North East. Johnson left hospital on 12 April.

On 14 April, figures released by the Office for National Statistics indicated that coronavirus had been linked to one in five deaths during the week ending 3 April. More than 16,000 deaths in the UK were recorded for that week, 6,000 higher than would be the average for that time of year. Several UK charities, including Age UK and the Alzheimer's Society, expressed their concern that older people were being "airbrushed" out of official figures because they focused on hospital deaths while not including those in care homes or a person's own home.

Matt Hancock announced new guidelines that would allow close family members to see dying relatives to say goodbye to them. Hancock also launched a new network to provide personal protective equipment to care home staff. On that day, NHS England and the Care Quality Commission began rolling out tests for care home staff and residents as it was reported the number of care home deaths was rising but that official figures, which relied on death certificates, were not reflecting the full extent of the problem. Also on 15 April, Arlene Foster, the First Minister of Northern Ireland, extended the period of lockdown in Northern Ireland to 9 May.

On 16 April, Dominic Raab revealed that lockdown restrictions would continue for "at least" another three weeks, and to relax them too early would "risk wasting all the sacrifices and all the progress that has been made". He set out five conditions for any easing of the lockdown . On that day the number of recorded deaths increased by 861 to 13,729, while the number of cases of the virus passed 100,000, reaching 103,093.

On 18 April, unions representing doctors and nurses expressed concern at a change in government guidelines advising medics to reuse gowns or wear other kits if stocks run low. Robert Jenrick, the Secretary of State for Local Government, announced a further £1.6bn of support for local authorities, on top of £1.6bn that was given to them at the beginning of the outbreak.

On 29 April, the number of people who had died with coronavirus in the UK passed 26,000, as official figures include deaths in the community, such as in care homes, for the first time. On 30 April, Boris Johnson said the country was "past the peak of this disease".

=== May 2020: Lockdown easing begins ===
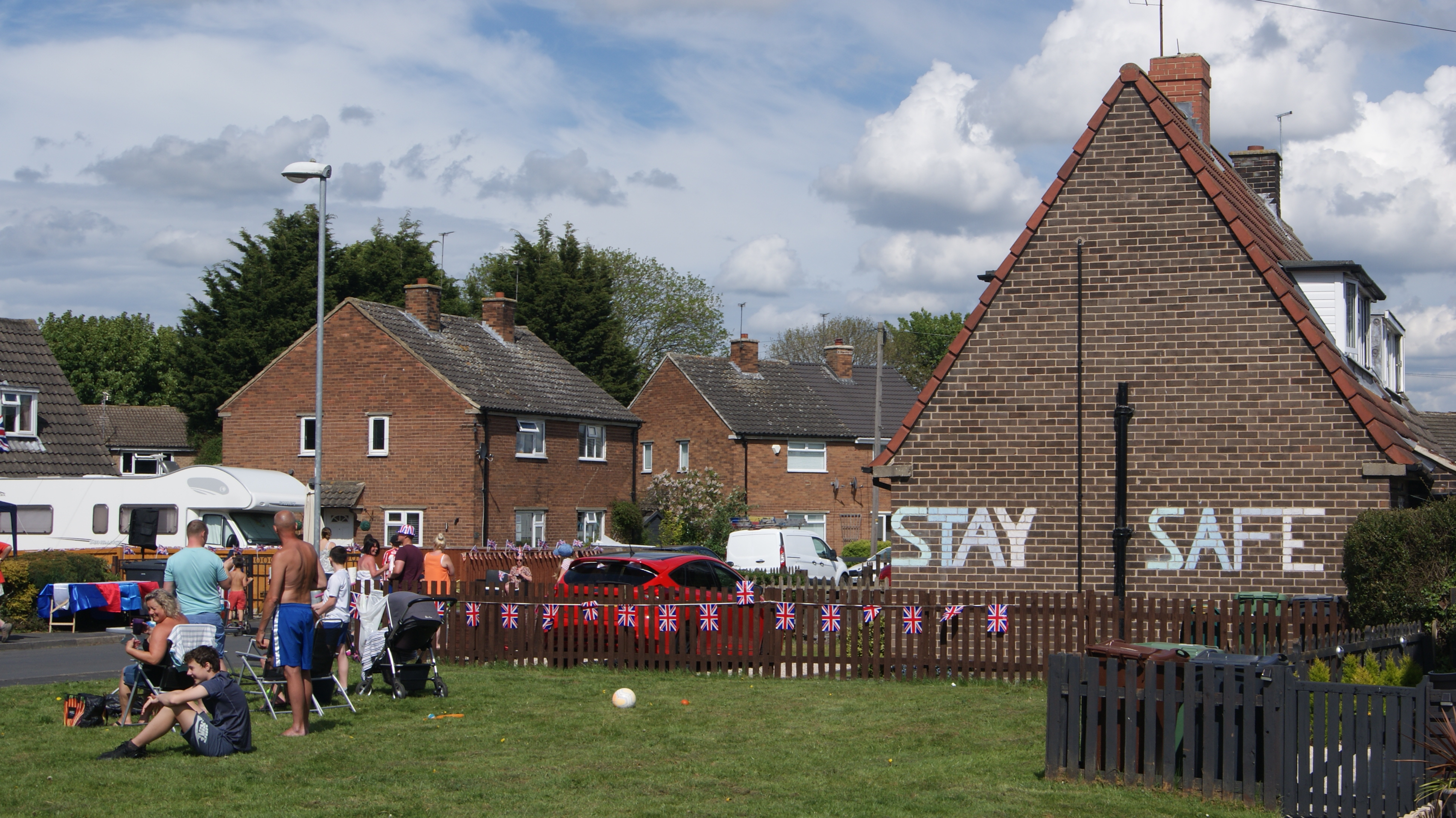
VE Day celebrations took place under lockdown; here a socially distanced street party is taking place on Hallfield Estate, Wetherby, West Yorkshire.

On 5 May, the UK death toll surpassed Italy's became the highest in Europe and second highest in the world.

On 7 May, the lockdown in Wales was extended by the Welsh Government, with some slight relaxations.

On 10 May, Prime Minister Johnson asked those who could not work remotely to go to work, avoiding public transport if possible; and encouraged the taking of "unlimited amounts" of outdoor exercise, and allowing driving to outdoor destinations within England. In his statement he changed the "Stay at Home" slogan to "Stay Alert". The devolved administrations in Scotland, Northern Ireland, and Wales did not adopt the new slogan as there had been no agreement with the UK government to change it, and because the announcement sent a mixed message to the public.

UK's COVID-19 Alert Levels (introduced in May 2020)

On 11 May, Johnson published a 60-page document called "Our Plan to rebuild: the UK Government's COVID-19 recovery strategy", with details of the COVID-19 recovery strategy for the UK. In the report a new COVID-19 alert level system was announced. At the same time the Cabinet Office published guidance on "staying safe outside your home", comprising eleven principles which "all of us" should adopt "wherever possible".

In May a COVID-19 alert system was announced, to be run by a new joint biosecurity centre. When first announced, Johnson stated that the UK was on level 4, moving towards level 3.

The Health and Safety Executive stated that from 9 March to 7 May they were contacted 4,813 times. Around 8% of the complaints related to Scotland. The executive managed to resolve 60% of them while another 40% needed further investigation, with some workplaces suspended whilst safety measures were put in place. As of 17 May the executive had not issued any enforcement notices in relation to COVID-19.

On 25 May, the prime minister's adviser Dominic Cummings was involved in a political scandal over his alleged breaches of the lockdown rules. Cummings rejected the allegations, denying that he had acted illegally. On 28 May, Durham police said that no offence had been committed when Cummings had travelled from London to Durham and that a minor breach might have occurred at Barnard Castle, but as there had been no apparent breach of social distancing rules, no further action would be taken.

The evening of 28 May saw the final Clap for Our Carers event. Scotland's First Minister Nicola Sturgeon announced an easing of the lockdown in Scotland from the following day, with people able to meet friends and family outside in groups of no more than eight but keeping two metres apart.

== Summer 2020: Continued restrictions and local lockdowns ==
=== June 2020: School openings and new regulations ===
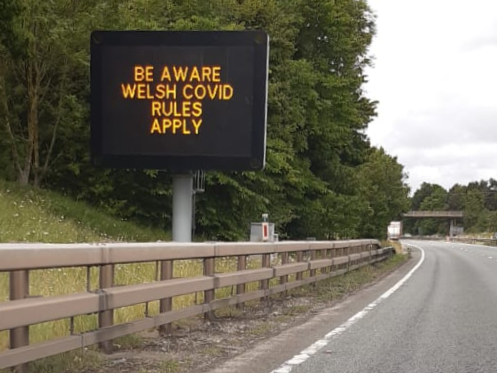
Sign indicating geographic differences in restrictions on the A55.

On 1 June, Primary schools in England reopened to some reception (4–5 years), year 1 (5–6 years) and year 6 (10–11 years) pupils with social distancing measures in place.

On 2 June the House of Commons was recalled for an earlier sitting to debate and vote on how to proceed with divisions, due to the pandemic.

On 3 June, briefings began (later referred to as 'press conferences') in a series that was set up by Welsh Government as a way of dispersing new information to the people of Wales regarding the COVID-19 pandemic in Wales.

On 6 June, Parliament Square in London, saw thousands of people participating in the Black Lives Matter protest against racism and police violence in the UK, following the murder of George Floyd by a police officer in Minneapolis, Minnesota. On 7 June, Health Minister Matt Hancock stated that although he supports the argument of the protests, there is "undoubtedly" a risk of a potential rise in the number of COVID-19 cases and the spread of the virus. Non-essential shops reopened across the UK during this month.

On 8 June, the government introduced The Health Protection (Coronavirus, International Travel) (England) Regulations 2020 which required anyone entering England from outside the Common Travel Area to self-isolate for 14 days upon arrival.

On 15 June, the government introduced The Health Protection (Coronavirus, Wearing of Face Coverings on Public Transport) (England) Regulations 2020, making the wearing of face coverings mandatory for most users of public transport.

=== July 2020: Compulsory masking and Northern lockdowns ===
World map of countries and territories from which travellers arriving in England from 10 July 2020 did not need to self-isolate

On 2 July, the government revised the total number of cases down by 30,302 because some people were counted twice in the earlier figures. The actual increase in the number of cases for 2 July was 576 or 0.18%.

On 17 July, Health Secretary Matt Hancock called for an urgent review into how COVID-19 deaths were recorded in England. Public Health England had said that the figures for deaths included people that had tested positive for the virus months before their death.

On 24 July, in England, new regulations made it compulsory to wear face coverings in most indoor shops and public spaces. Those breaking the rules could be fined up to £100. Face coverings remained optional in some indoor venues where wearing a mask might be 'impractical', such as restaurants and gyms. Exemptions were made for children under 11, individuals with physical or mental illness or disability, and for anyone to whom it might cause distress.

On 25 July, Health Ministers from all four governments met and agreed to add Spain back onto the quarantine list due to a spike in cases. This drew criticism from the Spanish PM, Pedro Sánchez, as the outbreak was largely only happening in Catalonia.

On 27 July, the first confirmed case of an animal infection with SARS-CoV-2 in the UK was reported, having been detected in a pet cat. UK health officials said that the cat had probably contracted COVID-19 from its owners, but there was no evidence that pets or other domestic animals can transmit the disease to humans.

On 30 July, the UK government announced that people in Greater Manchester, east Lancashire and parts of West Yorkshire faced new restrictions, banning separate households from meeting each other at home after a spike in COVID-19 cases. The new lockdown rules, which came into force at midnight, meant people from different households were not allowed to meet in homes or private gardens.

On 31 July, the UK government announced they were delaying further ease of lockdown restrictions in England until at least 15 August due to recent increases in cases. This ease of lockdown restrictions would have allowed "higher risk settings", including bowling alleys, skating rinks, and casinos, to open on 1 August.

By the end of the month, levels of travel and commerce had started to recover across the UK, but not yet returned to pre-pandemic levels.

=== August 2020: Manchester case rises, foreign isolation requirements ===
On 2 August, a major incident was declared in Greater Manchester after rises in coronavirus infection rates.

On 12 August, the death count for England was reduced by more than 5,000 to 41,329. Previously, people in England who died at any point following a positive test, regardless of cause, were counted in the figures. However, the other UK nations had a cut-off period of 28 days.

On 14 August, thousands of UK holidaymakers in France were rushing to the borders to the UK, following the announcement of anyone returning from France after 4 am on 15 August to self-isolate for fourteen days, causing massive queues and traffic jams at the harbours and Eurotunnel.

On 28 August, shortly before the reopening of schools at full capacity in England, Wales, and Northern Ireland, New Scientist examined the three-month history of the test and trace system. The magazine noted that the system had not met its targets and had been affected by an Internet outage in Southampton in the second week of August, affecting contact tracing for several thousand people. It criticised both the lack of a backup for such a vital system and the lack of transparency.

== Autumn 2020: Resurgence and second wave ==
=== September 2020: Tightening restrictions ===
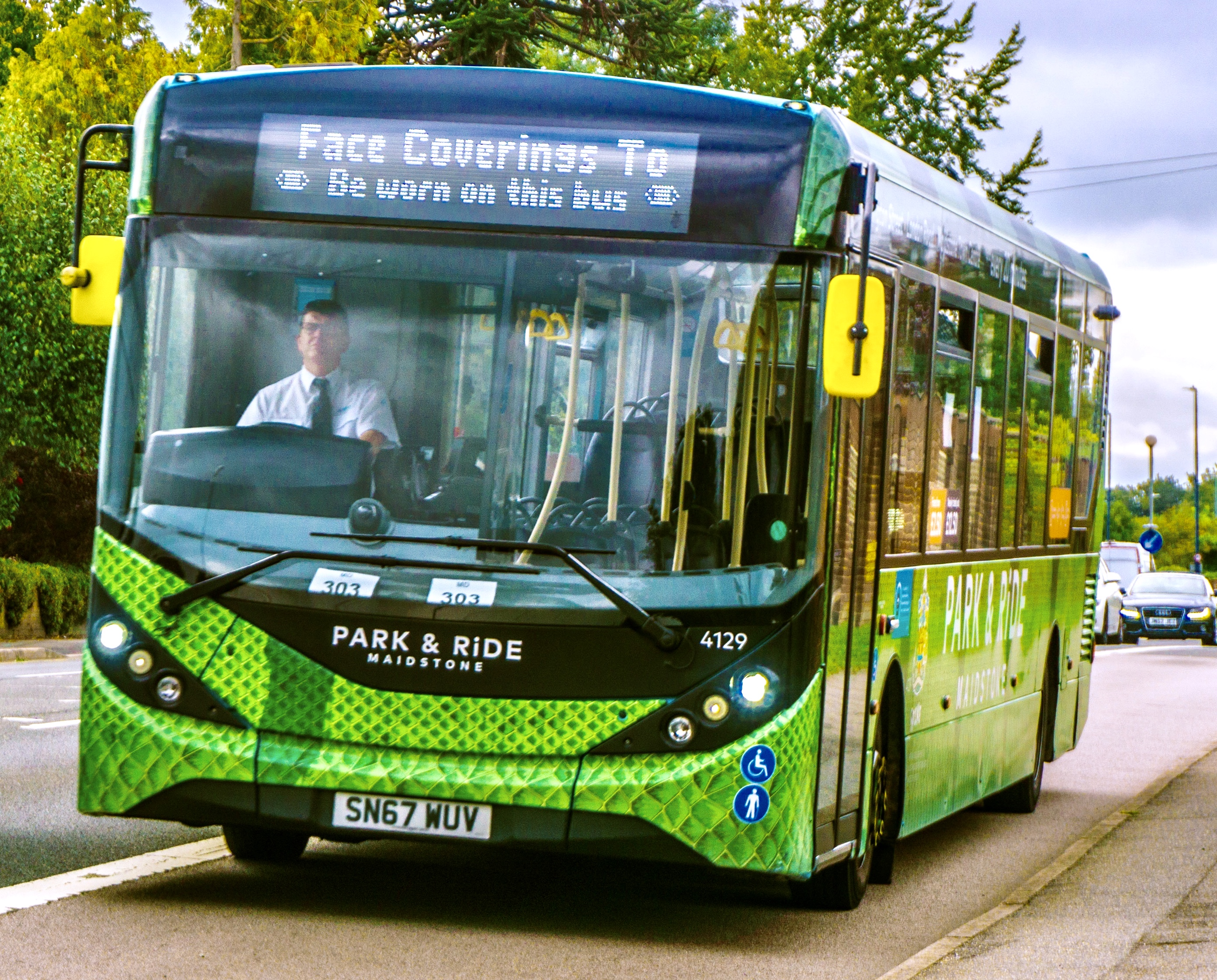
Bus in Maidstone with instructions to wear facemasks

On 6 September, concerns were raised over an increased number of cases in the preceding few days, a trend that continued into the following week.

On 8 September, the government published new social distancing rules to come into effect in England from 14 September, wherein all gatherings of separate households would be restricted to groups of six or few people (the so-called "rule of six"), excluding work or educational settings. Similar rules were also later announced (to begin on the same date) in Scotland and Wales, although – unlike in England – with exemptions for young children.

On 9 September, these rules were further elaborated in a government press conference, alongside details of new legal requirements for data gathering on behalf of venues, social distancing "marshals" to enforce restrictions, and the outline of a "moonshot" plan to further control the virus with greatly expanded mass virus testing. The £100bn "moonshot" plan was derided as lacking expert input by Professor Jon Deeks of the University of Birmingham and Cochrane, speculating on the consequences of false positives that might go along with testing such a large number of people.

The Welsh Government ended daily briefings in July, choosing to revert to a weekly press conference. In September the BBC decided that they would not show every Scottish briefing on BBC One Scotland, but would take an editorial view in regards to public health and continue to show it on the news channel, they took the same view with the Welsh briefing. In Scotland, more than 25,000 signed a petition calling on the BBC to reverse its decision.

On 18 September, the government tightened restrictions further in parts of the north east of England. Pubs were told to close every day from 10 pm to 5 am, and households were not allowed to mix. Later, new restrictions were announced for parts of the North West of England, Midlands, and West Yorkshire. By now 13.5 million people, around 1 in every 5 UK residents, were living under some degree of extra-local restrictions, including much of Northern England and Central Scotland, several council areas in the Midlands and South Wales, along with parts of Belfast and other areas in Northern Ireland.

On 21 September, the UK's coronavirus alert level was upgraded from 3 to 4, indicated the disease's transmission is "high or rising exponentially". This decision followed a warning from the UK government's Chief Scientific Advisor earlier that day, that the UK could be seeing 50,000 cases a day by October unless further action was taken to slow the virus's spread. Fears of a "second lockdown" caused a drop in UK stocks, although the following day the Prime Minister stated that potential additional restrictions would be "by no means a return to the full lockdown of March".

On 22 September, tightening of COVID-19 restrictions were announced by the UK government for England and the devolved administrations in the rest of the UK. Including 10 pm closing times for pubs across the UK and a ban on households meeting in other households in Scotland. In a televised address to the nation, Prime Minister Boris Johnson stated that additional rules to combat the case rise could last for a further 6 months.

On 29 September, the UK reported the highest daily rise in new infections with a total of 7,143 new cases.

=== October 2020: Circuit breakers ===
On 1 October, restrictions were tightened further in the North-East of England, now banning all indoor gatherings within households. The UK Government also advised people in the regions not to meet outside, although they did not ban people from meeting outside.

On 2 October, Margaret Ferrier, MP for Rutherglen and Hamilton West received calls from other politicians, including the Scottish First Minister, Nicola Sturgeon to resign from her seat. She had been suspended from the SNP for travelling from Scotland to London to attend a coronavirus debate in the House of Commons while awaiting a coronavirus test result, and then travelling back to Scotland after testing positive for COVID-19. Police also began an investigation.

On 3 October, Public Health England announced that a 'technical error' had caused the under-reporting of new cases for recent dates and that the missing positive results would be declared over the forthcoming days. The number of new cases declared on 3 October was approximately double the rate prevailing over the preceding few days.

On 4 October, Public Health England made a further announcement that 15,841 cases had been left out of the daily case figures between 25 September and 2 October and that these would be added to the figures for 3 and 4 October. The error was caused by a limit on the number of columns in an Excel spreadsheet. Hugh Pym, the BBC's health editor, said that daily figures for the end of the week were "actually nearer 11,000"; around 7,000 had been reported. Referring to the glitch, Labour used the term "shambolic". A smoothed curve of estimates from the COVID Symptom Study suggested that new cases might be estimated to be running just below 8,000 per day. After the corrections, total infections in the UK surpassed 500,000 – the fourth country in Europe to pass that milestone.

Tiered restrictions in England during the first tier system on 24 October 2020. Cream indicates Tier 1 (Medium), orange indicates Tier 2 (High), and red indicates Tier 3 (Very High).

On 12 October, a three-tier legal framework was introduced in England to help curb the spread of COVID-19 in local and regional lockdowns, coming into effect on 14 October. Liverpool became the first region under a Tier 3, which ordered the closure of pubs. Households were also banned from mixing in parts of the North-East of England and Manchester. The Harrogate, Manchester and Sunderland Nightingale Hospitals were also told to reopen as hospital admissions had risen above the peak in March.

On 13 October, daily deaths increased by more than 100 for the first time since 27 July with 143 deaths recorded in the 24-hour period.

On 14 October, the Northern Irish government announced that from 16 October, Pubs, Restaurants, and school closures as well as a ban on mixing in households would come into force, essentially putting Northern Ireland in lockdown. Pubs and Restaurants would be closed for 4 weeks whereas schools would only be shut for 2 weeks.

On 15 October, the government announced that London would move to Tier 2 lockdown following a spike in cases, banning people from mixing indoors privately, while Greater Manchester would move to Tier 3, two months after a Major Incident was declared. The Tier 3 restrictions on Greater Manchester were delayed as Johnson was in a dispute with the mayor, Andy Burnham, who wanted additional financial support for the area.

On 19 October, Labour MP Yasmin Qureshi was admitted to the Royal Bolton Hospital and was being treated for pneumonia, after testing positive for COVID-19. She had been feeling unwell for nearly two weeks and was also self-isolating before being admitted to the hospital. On the same day, Welsh first minister Mark Drakeford announced that Wales would go into a two-week "time-limited firebreak" lockdown from 23 October to 9 November. Leisure businesses, community centres, libraries, recycling centres, and places of worship (apart from weddings and funerals) would shut whilst gatherings and the sale of non-essential goods would be banned. Schools and colleges would initially shut for the scheduled half term and only reopen in the second week for pupils in year 8 (12–13 years old) and below.

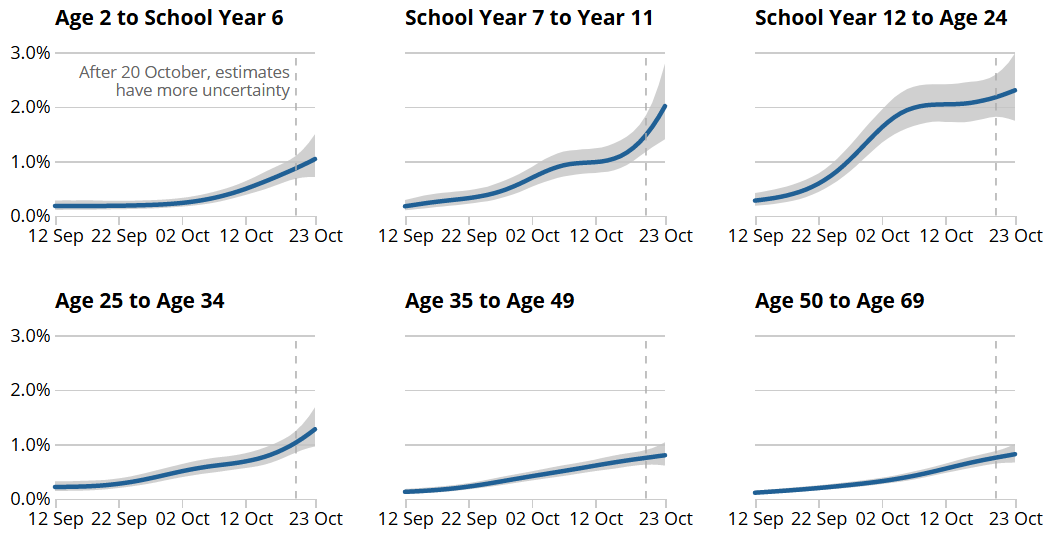
COVID-19 infection rates by age range in England from September to October

On 30 October, the Office for National Statistics weekly infection survey in England showed that secondary school children ages 11 to 16 had the fastest rate of increase in COVID-19 incidence of any measured age range, giving them the second highest average incidence of 2.0% of any age range, fifty times higher than when children returned to school after the summer holiday, and slightly behind the 16 to 24 years old age range at 2.3% incidence.

Wales entered a 3-week firebreak period on 21 October, which was described by James Forsyth of the Spectator as "the most dramatic divergence between the UK nations yet".

On 31 October, Prime Minister Boris Johnson announced that England would enter a four-week national lockdown on 5 November, when pubs, restaurants, leisure centres, and non-essential shops would close. Unlike in March, schools, colleges and universities would remain open. In addition, the furlough scheme was extended to the end of November. This came as the UK became the ninth country to exceed 1 million cases of COVID-19 nationwide.

=== November 2020: New lockdowns ===
On 2 November, a five-level tier system came into force in Scotland to help curb the spread of COVID-19 in regional and local areas. In Scotland, Edinburgh, Glasgow, and all towns in the central belt were placed on level 3.

No regions of Scotland were immediately placed under level 4 restrictions.

On 5 November, England entered a second, four-week-long lockdown.

2 November: Mark Drakeford announces travel restriction between Wales and the rest of the UK.

On 9 November, Wales ended its firebreak lockdown and returned to national measures. Two household bubbles could be formed now, 15 people could meet indoors while up to 30 people could now meet outdoors. Schools also reopened as well as non-essential businesses. While travel restrictions within Wales were lifted, people couldn't travel to and from England unless there was an essential reason and the Welsh government still advised working remotely.

Total deaths in the UK passed 50,000 on 11 November, the first European nation to do so. It came as the governments of the various countries of the UK announced an evacuation-style plan to get university students home for Christmas and to continue distance education. By this time, the total number of cases reported was 1,256,725 and the death toll was 50,365.

The following day, 12 November, a new daily high of 33,470 COVID-19 cases which had tested positive were reported for the United Kingdom as a whole, making a new record for the daily figures since mass testing commenced.

On 13 November, Vaughan Gething, Health Minister, announced that the initial positive test by Lighthouse Labs (Uk based) has been overturned by Public Health Wales and confirmed that all contact tracing in Wales is organised by the Welsh Government: and that they have contacted 9 out of 10 contacts received from people who have been infected."

Also, the UK Government shortened quarantines for travellers arriving in England to seven days with a 'Test and Release' programme requiring those self-isolating to test negative before leaving quarantine. Heathrow Airport also introduced rapid testing before travellers would board their flights.

On 23 November, trials showed that the COVID-19 vaccine developed by Oxford/AstraZeneca was 70% effective, which could be as high as 90% by tweaking the dose. While hailed as a success, it was 25% less effective than the vaccines developed by Pfizer and Moderna. On the same day, the UK government published some details of a proposed new three-tier legal framework which would apply in England from 2 December.

On 25 November, a total of 696 new deaths due to COVID-19 were announced for the UK, the highest daily figure of coronavirus-related fatalities reported since 5 May 2020.

At the end of November, the UK Government announced it would offer four months of free vitamin D supplements to all those in care homes and shielders – with the prison service also providing supplements to prisoners.

On 29 November, Nadhim Zahawi, Parliamentary Under-Secretary of State for Business, Energy and Industry was appointed as COVID vaccine deployment minister.

On 2 December, England ended its second lockdown and implemented a replacement three-tier system under The Health Protection (Coronavirus, Restrictions) (All Tiers) (England) Regulations 2020.

== Winter 2020–21: Immunisation, new variant and surge ==
=== December 2020: First vaccines approved, new variant ===
On 2 December, the Pfizer‑BioNTech COVID‑19 vaccine (BNT162b2) was approved by the Medicines and Healthcare products Regulatory Agency (MHRA) making the UK the first country in the world to approve a COVID–19 vaccination. The first consignment of the Pfizer–BioNTech COVID-19 vaccine arrived in the UK on 3 December. On the same day, government agreed under regulation secondary to the Vaccine Damage Payment Act 1979 the statutory £120,000 blanket payout for any person provably damaged by the vaccine, and by the same token, government-approved COVAX manufacturers were exempted from legal pursuit. Individuals who provide the vaccine (and thus are permitted by the government to do so) are also protected. Statutory Instrument 2020 No. 1125 had on 16 October delegated permission to "the classes of persons permitted to administer medicinal products under the protocol" written by the MHRA, as opposed to delegating permission to NHS staff only as had been the practice before the publication of this instrument.

On 8 December, the immunisation campaign commenced, with 90-year-old Margaret Keenan becoming the first individual to receive the Pfizer–BioNTech COVID-19 vaccine, the first administration of this COVID-19 vaccine outside of a clinical trial. This milestone was dubbed "V-day" by some media outlets, an allusion that combined the initial of "vaccine" with a reference to wartime victory celebrations. She received her second dose on 29 December, and then had a 5-day wait for optimum protection.

On 19 December, it was announced that a new "tier four" measure would be applied to Bedfordshire, Berkshire, Buckinghamshire, Hertfordshire, Kent, London, and parts of Cambridgeshire, East Sussex, Essex, and Surrey, to try to control the spread of a new variant of the virus, Variant of Concern 202012/01. At the time the restrictions were announced, the new variant was becoming more prevalent; it appeared to be more contagious than previous variants, but there was no evidence of its virulence, and susceptibility to vaccinations was unclear. Under tier four restrictions people are not permitted to interact with others from outside of their own household, even on Christmas Day. This restriction would apply from midnight of 19/20 December. Johnson announced that relaxation of rules outside the new tier 4 over Christmas would now only be for Christmas Day. It was also announced that restrictions would tighten in Wales. Nicola Sturgeon announced that the whole of Scotland would enter Scotland's tier four, and travel to and from the rest of the UK would be banned. An exception in Scotland was likewise provided for Christmas Day, and a five-day relaxation of rules was cancelled.

From 20 December 2020 countries around the world were introducing bans on travel from the UK as the first response to the new variant. Operation Brock was implemented to park lorries on the M20 motorway as ferry travel to France for passengers and accompanied freight were stopped entirely. Unaccompanied freight could continue to move, and goods traffic from France into the UK was not directly affected, although drivers may be reluctant to enter the UK and have to quarantine on return. On 22 December, France started allowing accompanied freight again, as long as the driver had proof of a negative COVID-19 test within the past 72 hours.

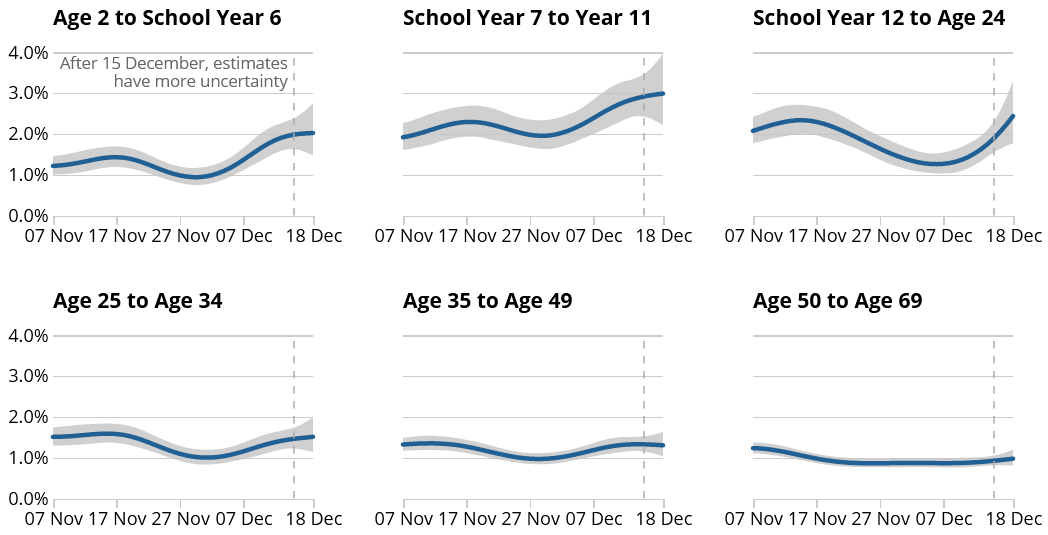
COVID-19 infection rates by age range in England to 18 December. The dip shown follows schools half-term one-week holiday and the four-week national lockdown, excluding schools, in November.

On 24 December, the Office for National Statistics weekly infection survey in England showed that COVID-19 incidence in secondary school children ages 11 to 16 had increased to 3.0%, the highest of any measured age range and two and a half times higher than the all ages average of 1.2% incidence. Subsequently, Education Secretary Gavin Williamson announced on 30 December that schools in some English areas with high COVID-19 levels would remain closed to most children after the Christmas holiday for the first week or two of January, reversing his previous position. The government expected secondary schools to offer weekly lateral flow COVID-19 tests to pupils from January. Former Chief Scientific Adviser Sir Mark Walport stated that secondary school children were seven times more likely to introduce COVID-19 into a household than other members of a household.

UK hospitals and emergency services came under severe strain in late December, surpassing their previous record of highest hospital capacity set in April as a result of a record surge in COVID-19 cases. London emergency services had one of the "busiest days ever" on 26 December, and hospitals across the Southeast restricted staff leave and non-COVID related care in response. The NHS warned of further strain on resources, deaths and hospitalisations into January. A record 55,892 new cases were reported on 31 December, along with 964 deaths.

On 30 December the (ChAdOx1 nCoV-19 or AZD1222) vaccine developed by Oxford University and AstraZeneca (the British-Swedish pharmaceutical and biopharmaceutical company), became the second COVID-19 vaccine approved for use in the UK, for deployment the following week. This advance was reported to allow for a rapid increase in the speed of the vaccination programme, due to more doses being available, and due to the Oxford vaccine's higher storage temperature making distribution easier. On the same day, COVID-19 restrictions increased across England as regions containing 20 million people were escalated to the highest "tier 4" restrictions, across the North of England, the Midlands, and the South West.

=== January 2021: Vaccination expands and third lockdown ===
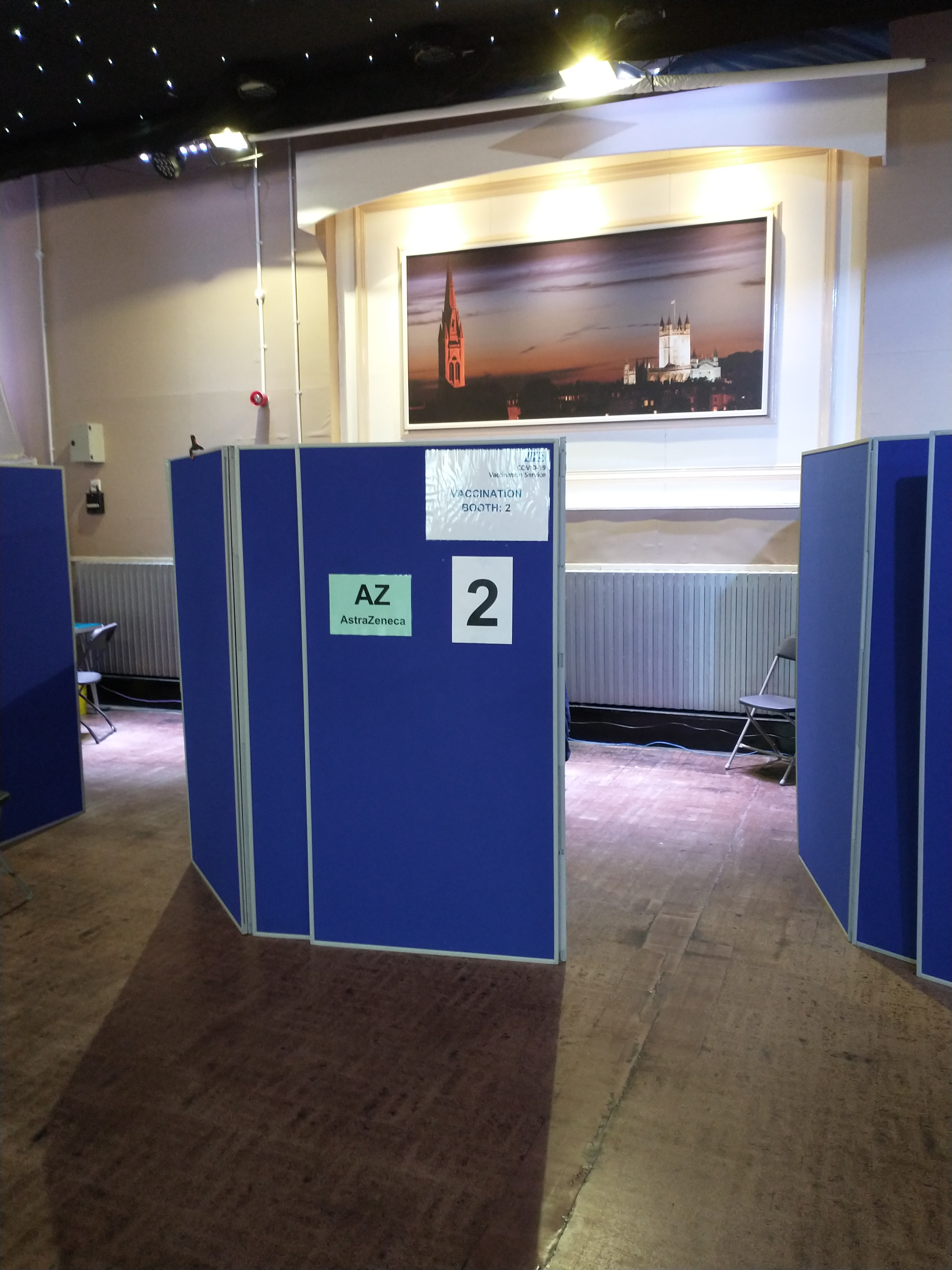
A vaccination booth in a temporary NHS vaccination centre

On 4 January 82-year-old Brian Pinker became the first person to receive the Oxford–AstraZeneca COVID-19 vaccine as the UK vaccination programme expanded to include it. On the same day, the Prime Minister stated that Covid-induced restrictions would likely increase as cases continued to surge across the country, with more than 50,000 daily cases reported for the sixth consecutive day, and the Labour Party calling for immediate escalated action across England.

In addition, the First Minister of Scotland announced new restrictions for Scotland, with stay-at-home orders issued and closure of schools until February. The Prime Minister later confirmed that England would enter a third lockdown from 5 January, with similar restrictions to the first lockdown in March 2020, including school closures unlike the second lockdown in November. Restrictions were initially expected to last until mid-February. In Wales, the government confirmed that schools and colleges will remain closed until 18 January, this was later extended to 22 February.

On 6 January the House of Commons was recalled from recess to debate and vote on regulations relating to public health.

On 8 January 2021, MRNA-1273 (commonly known as the Moderna COVID-19 vaccine) was the third COVID-19 vaccine approved for use in the UK. In total, 17 million doses have been ordered.

After receiving approval from the Medicines and Healthcare products Regulatory Agency (MHRA) on 30 December 2020, the Oxford–AstraZeneca COVID-19 vaccine started being administered in Scotland on 11 January 2021, in GP practices and community centers across the country.

On 26 January, the Prime Minister announced in an address that in the period leading up to 25 January from the start of the pandemic, over 100,000 people in the UK had died within 28 days of a positive COVID-19 test, the UK being the fifth country to reach this number of deaths. The following day, the Prime Minister also announced a plan for "phased easing" of restrictions beginning in early March dependent on the statistics at that time, although also noting that schools in England would remain closed until 8 March "at the earliest". Northern Irish schools were later confirmed to also be closed until this date, although on 29 January it was announced that schools in Wales could still open as soon as 22 February if cases continued to fall in the region.

=== February 2021: Variants of concern and vaccination efficacy ===
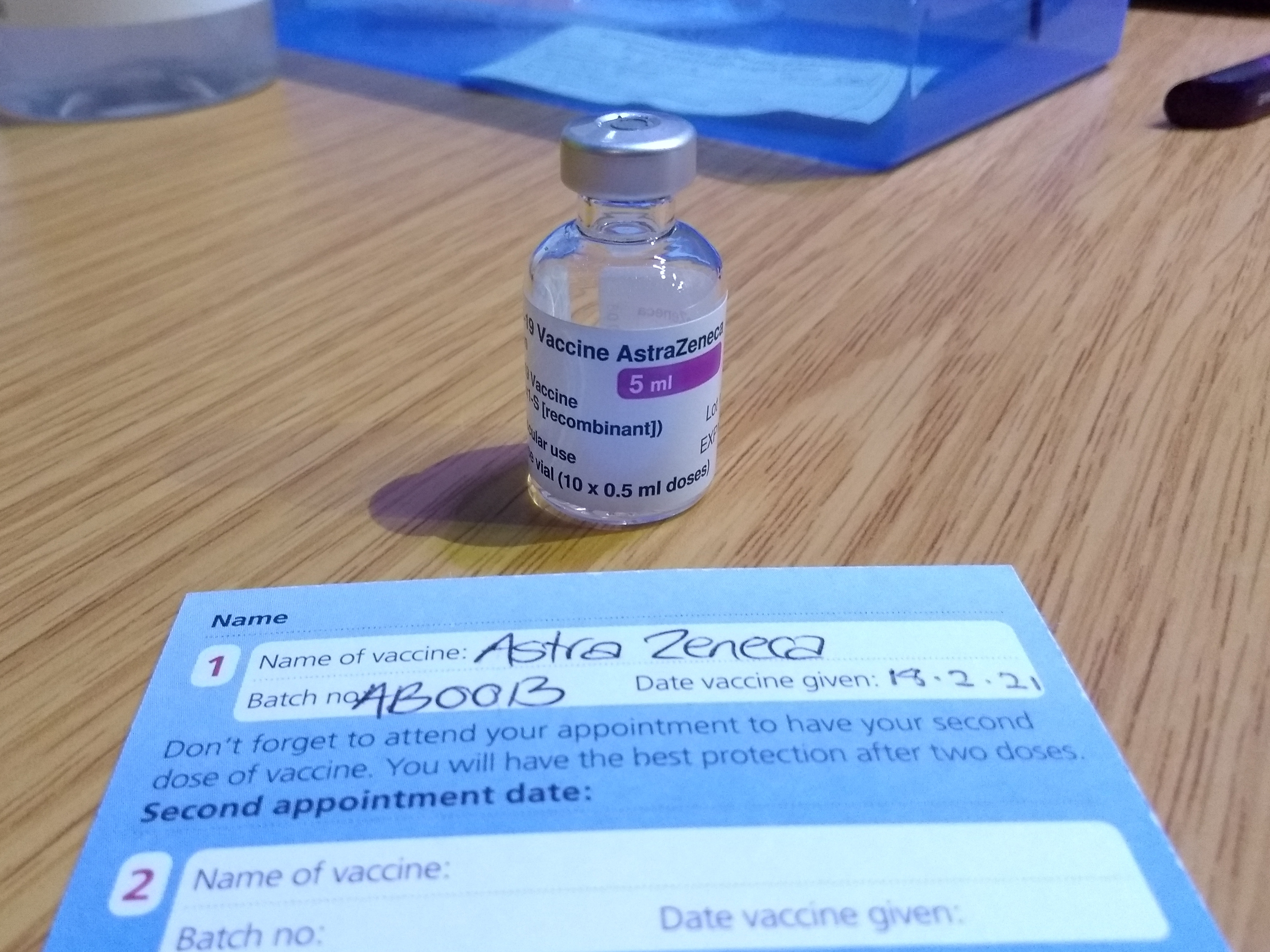
AstraZeneca vaccine vial and a NHS patient COVID-19 vaccination record card at a NHS vaccination centre

On 1 February, urgent testing was ordered after community cases of a South African COVID-19 variant were found in England, believed to be more contagious than other variants.

On 3 February it was reported that a new version of the Oxford vaccine could be ready by the Autumn to tackle mutated variants.

On 8 February, vaccines minister Nadhim Zahawi said that the UK public should "have confidence" in the UK's vaccines, after a study found that the Oxford-AstraZeneca vaccine had "minimal protection" against mild disease caused by the South African COVID-19 variant. The health minister however stated that there was "no evidence" that the vaccine would not protect against "severe illness". Other variants, such as the Kent "B117" variant, were previously found to still be effectively protected against by the Oxford vaccine. It was also announced that booster shots to protect against disease variants could eventually be provided.

By 14 February, the UK successfully hit its target of 15 million first-dose COVID-19 vaccinations by mid-February, encompassing the top four priority groups for vaccination. Next phrase rollouts were announced to cover those aged 65–69 in England, among other groups.

On 16 February, scientists in the UK identified another new variant of COVID-19 B.1.525, which appears similar to the South African 501.V2 variant and has been seen in other countries, including Denmark, Nigeria and the United States. B.1.525 had been listed as a 'variant under investigation' as it was too soon to say if it had to be added to the UK's list of variants of concern and whether mass testing for it had to happen. Ravi Gupta of the University of Cambridge has said the new variant appeared to have significant mutations already seen in some of the other new variants, which means its likely effect can be predicted. Public Health England has said there is no evidence that the mutations in the new variant make the virus more transmissible or cause severe disease.

On 20 February, the government announced a new vaccination target, to offer all UK adults the first dose of a COVID-19 vaccine by the end of July, bringing a previous September target forward to the Summer.

On 22 February, Prime Minister Boris Johnson laid out a country-wide roadmap for lockdown lifting, including a four-step plan for England that would see all restrictions on social contact removed by 21 June at the earliest. Other UK leaders laid out plans for the lifting of restrictions for the other UK nations, including a plan for Scotland that would ultimately lead to the country returning to local restriction tiers, and additional reviews planned in the following weeks for Wales and Northern Ireland. While explaining the English plan, Johnson emphasised the "cautious but irreversible" nature of the plan, with easing determined by "data not dates", and delays to the roadmap being possible if the country failed to meet conditions on the state of the pandemic. Indicative dates in the announcement were:

- 8 March – schools re-open
- 29 March – two households or six people allowed to meet outdoors, travel permitted outside the local area
- 12 April – opening of non-essential retail and personal services, and other lockdown easing; this date was confirmed at a government press conference on 5 April.
- 17 May – most rules affecting outdoor social contact will be removed, two households or six people can meet indoors, indoor hospitality services can be provided and hotels can open; this date was confirmed at a government press conference on 10 May.
- 21 June (or later) – all limits on social contact removed.

Furthermore, the PM announced that international travel would not resume until 17 May; the country aiming to permit free international movement of vaccinated travellers.

At the end of the month, it was announced that six cases of the Lineage P.1 variant had been detected in the UK, three in Scotland, and three in England. However, the identity of one of the English people who tested positive was not known and an intensive search for them was begun. Those infected had flown to the UK shortly before the hotel quarantine measures had come into place.

== Spring 2021: Reopening ==
=== March 2021: Phase 1 ===
On 8 March, Schools in England reopened, with secondary schools requiring masks in lessons and twice-weekly tests for students and teachers.

On 23 March, to mark one year exactly after the first lockdown, 2 minutes of silence were held at 12:00 to remember all those who had died from COVID-19.

On 29 March, the rule of 6 was reintroduced outside, where people were allowed to meet in groups of up to 6 people outside and travel was allowed outside local areas.

=== April 2021: Phase 2 and Delta variant ===
On 12 April, outdoor pubs, restaurants, and non-essential shops reopened in England.

On 16 April, the Scottish government accelerated the easing of lockdown to allow 6 people from 6 households to meet outside.

On 23 April, India was added to the UK's red list after a rise in cases and the discovery of lineage B.1.617 was found to be spreading in the UK, requiring anyone entering from India to isolate for 10 days in a hotel with two COVID tests as well as banning all non-British nationals from India entering the UK. Boris Johnson also cancelled his scheduled visit to India due to the situation.

=== May 2021: Restrictions loosen further ===
On 17 May, most rules affecting outdoor social contact were removed, two households or six people were allowed to meet indoors, indoor hospitality services were provided and hotels were opened.

On 27 May, Health Secretary Matt Hancock said that "more than half and potentially as many as three-quarters of all new cases" were of a sublineage of B.1.617, but still largely in hotspots such as Bolton, Bedford, and Blackburn with Darwen.

On 28 May, the United Kingdom granted authorisation for the use of the Janssen COVID-19 vaccine in the country.

== Summer 2021: Third wave and second reopening ==
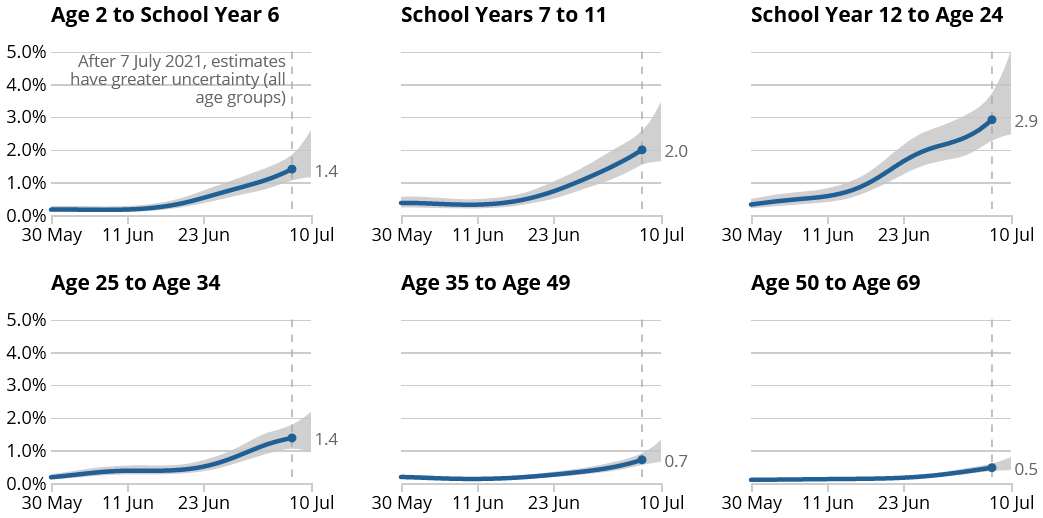
COVID-19 infection rates by age-range in England in June and early July. The reduced effect of the newly dominant Delta variant on a mostly older age-range vaccinated population is shown.

=== June 2021: Unlocking delayed ===
On 14 June, the proposed end of all social contact restrictions on 21 June was delayed for up to 4 weeks (until 19 July) and vaccination roll-out was accelerated following concerns over the Delta variant of COVID-19, which was first identified in India and is thought to be substantially more transmissible than the previously dominant Alpha variant, which was first identified in Kent.

=== July 2021: English unlocking ===
The Delta variant became the dominant strain in the UK and drove a third wave in infections by July 2021. Despite daily cases continuing to rise, the government announced that most restrictions would be lifted in England by the end of July, including face masks mandates, social distancing measures and capacity limitations in venues. These were replaced by recommendations. The vaccination programme reduced the number of hospitalisations and deaths compared to previous waves, although public health experts expressed concern at the ending of restrictions while community transmission remained high. The number of new cases increased rapidly to a peak over 50,000 per day on 18 July, then dropped equally rapidly over the following week, confounding predictions. Experts suggested several reasons, including the end of the UEFA Euro 2020 football tournament, the beginning of school and university holidays, and widespread self-isolation driven by the NHS contact tracing app.

=== August 2021: Welsh and Scottish unlocking ===
Most remaining legal restrictions ended in Wales and Scotland on 7 and 9 August respectively, however unlike in England, face masks remained compulsory in certain settings. Whilst rules were also easing there, by the middle of the month, restrictions in Northern Ireland were in places the strictest in the UK with not only mandatory facemasks in some locations but also continued compulsory indoor social distancing, closed nightclubs and a ten-person cap on the number that could meet in a private home. This month also saw the milestone of a 75% vaccination rate among adults in the UK being passed. Mass vaccination was also expanded to young people aged sixteen and seventeen years old. A sharp rise to a record number of cases was noted in Scotland towards the end of the month following the reopening of schools there for the new academic year several weeks prior to those in the rest of the UK.

== Autumn 2021: Restrictions ended, cases continue ==
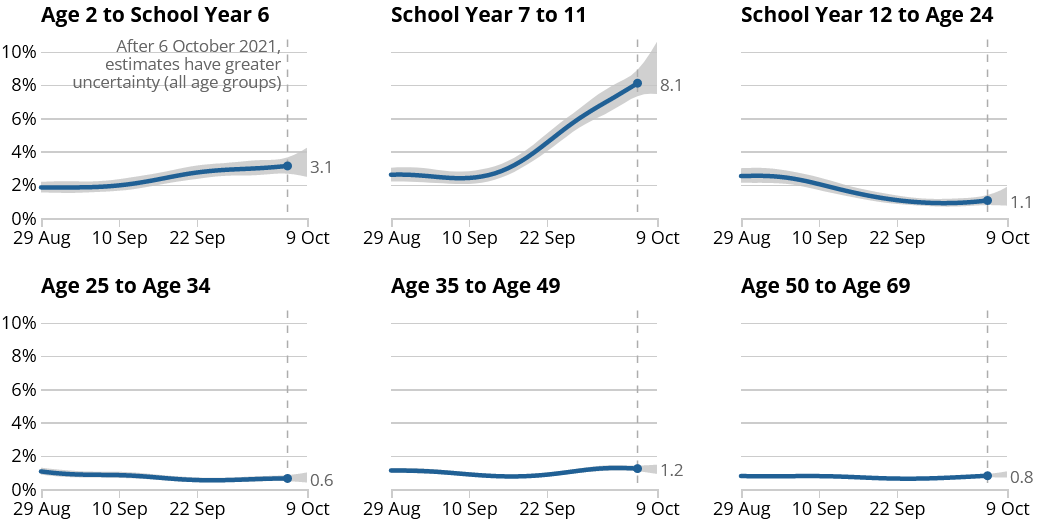
COVID-19 infection rates by age-range in England in September and early October. The very large increase amongst largely unvaccinated secondary school children after return from summer holidays is shown.

=== September 2021: Vaccination of adolescents begins ===
Having previously been rejected by the Joint Committee on Vaccination and Immunisation on the basis of them only providing "marginal gain" to the health of individual children, vaccines for adolescents aged 12 to 15 were approved by the UK's chief medical officers on the basis of reducing disruption to education. Meanwhile, booster vaccines were also introduced for the over 50s, vulnerable people and health or social care workers. A plan for tighter restrictions in England if the NHS came under pressure over the winter months was also announced. Additionally, vaccine passports (compulsory vaccinations for those using certain facilities) were planned for early October in Scotland and Wales but rejected for the time being in England.

=== October 2021: Higher rates, lower deaths ===
COVID-19 infection rates in the UK were among the highest in the world by early October. Factors which have been described as contributing to this included England's early relaxation of restrictions and the UK's late introduction of mass vaccination for adolescents. However, high levels of vaccine take up among those most vulnerable to the virus continued to keep rates of mortality and hospitalisations according to analysis by the BBC at roughly the level of a bad flu season. By late October COVID hospitalisations were rising and deaths were the highest since March 2021. COVID cases exceeded 50,000 for the first time since July 2021, doctors urged the government to reintroduce measures like compulsory face masks and remote work. Various experts suggested that high rates of infection in the country had been normalised despite ongoing strain on the healthcare system. Meanwhile, COVID-19 passes came into force in Wales on 11 October and, after a two-week delay, 17 October in Scotland.

=== November 2021: Omicron variant emerges ===
By November, rates of COVID-19 cases and deaths in the UK were again falling with statistics for England suggesting that this fall was particularly sharp among children and youth under the age of twenty. Whilst the booster vaccination rollout was expanded to people in their forties.

However, towards the end of the month, on the 28th, restrictions were increased again - including mandatory mask wearing in shops and on public transport in England - due to fears over the newly detected Omicron variant observed in viral genome sequencing performed in South Africa. Two cases of the new variant had previously been detected in the UK. The following day saw significant expansion to the vaccine rollout including the introduction of second doses for 12 to 15 year olds, third doses for younger adults and fourth doses for people with certain health problems. Health officials encouraged the public to limit social contact and get vaccinated. Some scientists fear Boris Johnson is not doing enough to discourage socialising over Christmas and this could lead to a surge in infections in the new year.

== Winter 2021–22: Omicron wave ==
=== December 2021: Omicron proliferates, "Plan B" restrictions ===
On 3 December the first recorded Welsh case of the Omicron variant of the virus was detected. The following day, it was announced that GP surgeries in England would be enabled to defer certain routine health checks and minor surgeries until the end of March, in an effort to help accelerate booster vaccination rollout. By the 7th, 437 Omicron cases had been reported, with the government stating that the variant showed signs of increased transmissibility as compared to the Delta variant. The day prior, many news outlets reported a prediction that Omicron could become the dominant UK variant within a matter of weeks.

On 8 December a suite of new "Plan B" COVID-19 response restrictions were announced in a government press conference to be phased in over the following week. These included remote work recommendations, mandatory face masks in most indoor public venues, and a requirement for people to present an NHS COVID Pass (for England and Wales), negative lateral-flow test, or equivalent Scottish or Northern Irish "Covid passports" to gain entry to certain densely populated venues.

On 10 December the UK Health Security Agency released a briefing that reported findings that the Omicron variant could reduce the efficacy of vaccines, citing a "20- to 40-fold reduction in neutralising activity by Pfizer 2-dose vaccinee sera for Omicron compared to early pandemic viruses", and "at least 10 fold loss of activity when compared to Delta". However, the briefing also reported that a booster jab could increase vaccine efficacy in the short term to "70 to 75%", leading to increased calls for more booster jab uptake. On the 12th, the education secretary Nadhim Zahawi stated that the first hospital admissions from Omicron in the UK were occurring, and that "a third" of new cases in London could be attributed to the variant. On the 13th, the UK announced its first confirmed death from Omicron. The Prime Minister also announced that a new target was being set to bring forward the date by which all adults would be offered a booster jab to the end of the month, alongside increased rollout measures to help achieve this goal.

On 14 December Scotland announced additional social mixing guidelines, urging residents to limit social mixing to no more than three households, although clarifying that this would not apply on Christmas Day. On the same day, the UK also removed all countries from the travel red list, with Health Secretary Sajid Javid citing the established presence of the Omicron variant in the UK as obviating the purpose of additional travel quarantine restrictions to those countries in which it was initially detected.

By 17 December the UK Health and Security Agency announced that the Omicron variant had become dominant in the UK, with 54% of new cases that week exhibiting characteristic S-gene dropout. This number included up to 80% of new cases in London, contrasting with a low of 27% in the North-East of England. The variant was also considered to be dominant in Scotland, with a suspected case proportion of 51% reported. The following day, the Mayor of London Sadiq Khan declared another "major incident" in the capital due to the rapid rise in Omicron variant cases, leading to the largest number of daily cases (26,000) recorded for the city since the pandemic began.

On 22 December the UK topped over 100,000 daily COVID-19 cases for the first time in the pandemic. Preliminary studies reported in the media and referenced by government officials, including analysis by the UK Health Security Agency, suggested that Omicron may result in less severe symptoms than Delta, though this had not been conclusively proven. Due to the confirmed highly infectious nature of Omicron and its rapid spread, there were fears the NHS could be overwhelmed. The Health Service was already under severe pressure due to COVID and other factors; many Health Service medical staff were off work due to COVID and other reasons. There were plans to turn rooms normally used for other purposes into wards if necessary, and to potentially set up tents in hospital car parks to treat patients. On 19 December almost 19,000 NHS workers were off work through Covid. That was 54% above the previous week. NHS Providers, representing English hospital and ambulance services, maintained the health service faced its busiest Christmas time ever, that overall 94.5% of adult beds were occupied while 89% were occupied at Christmas 2020.

On Boxing day and the following day, restrictions were tightened in Wales, Scotland and Northern Ireland. Changes varied but predominantly focused on limiting attendance and enforcing social distancing in certain recreational facilities. Restrictions were not intensified in England in the days after Christmas Day. Meanwhile, the public were encouraged by text to get their booster vaccinations.

=== January 2022: Rules relaxed again ===
Boris Johnson said on 4 January that he hoped to avoid imposing any more restrictions in England and to "ride out" the Omicron wave of the virus. He said he recommend in cabinet that previously imposed "plan B" restrictions be maintained. In any case, analysis by Warwick University suggested that the time period when extra controls could have significantly affected the peak of the current wave may have already passed. On 8 January, deaths reached 150,000, the highest in Europe at that time.

On 11 January, epidemiologist Professor David Heymann from the London School of Hygiene and Tropical Medicine said that the UK likely had one of the highest levels of population immunity in the world and that the pandemic was showing signs of becoming an endemic. He said that the Office of National statistics had recently "estimated about 95% of the population in England and a little less than in other parts of the United Kingdom do have antibody to infection either from vaccination or from natural infection." Meanwhile, restrictions on large outdoor events were lifted in Scotland. On 14 January, a plan was set out to relax restrictions in Wales over the following two weeks. On 18 January, a similar rollback of restrictions was announced in Scotland for 24 January. The next day, the end of "plan B" restrictions introduced due to Omicron on 26 January was announced in England. A day later the removal of additional Post-Christmas restrictions and an end to the use of vaccine passports (with the exception of night clubs and large events) by 26 January was announced in Northern Ireland.

=== February 2022: Restrictions end in Northern Ireland and England ===
On 9 February, Boris Johnson announced his intention for all remaining COVID-19 related restrictions in England to expire a month earlier than previously planned on 24 March. Various charities, trade unions and scientists criticised this decision describing it as premature. All remaining legal restrictions were ended in Northern Ireland on 15 February. In Scotland and Wales, representatives of the respective devolved governments said in the Scottish case that it would be "too early" to end self-isolation and in the Welsh case that similar changes could be considered next month. On 15 and 16 February 2022, plans were announced across the UK to expand the Pfizer vaccine rollout to children from the age of five; the Vaccinations Committee approved this taking into account an estimate that over 85% of all children aged 5 to 11 had experienced COVID-19 infection by the end of the previous month. On 20 February, Queen Elizabeth II tested positive for COVID-19, reporting "mild cold-like symptoms", but expecting that she would continue to perform "light duties".

On 21 February, Boris Johnson announced that the legal compulsion to self isolate would end in England on 24 February along with the £500 payment to support self-isolating low income households. Free mass testing would be ended on 1 April and targeted at the most vulnerable. The following day, Nicola Sturgeon announced that Scotland's vaccine passport scheme would end on 28 February and all legal restrictions would be removed on 21 March.

== Spring 2022 ==
=== March 2022: Restrictions end in Wales and Scotland ===
On 4 March, 28 March was announced to be the end date of all remaining Covid-19 related legal restrictions in Wales. It was at the time expected to be the final part of the UK to take this step. Free mass testing would also be phased out. On 15 March, the conclusion of all COVID-19 related restrictions on inbound international travel was announced for 18 March. Meanwhile, obligatory facemasks in shops and on public transport were extended in Scotland to 4 April.

The numbers of cases, hospitalisations, and deaths had been decreasing in early 2022, but following the relaxation of restrictions in England from 24 February the figures were all increasing by mid-March, with most cases now probably due to the slightly more transmissible BA.2 omicron sub-variant. The rise was more marked in people over 55. Jenny Harries, chief executive of the UK Health Security Agency, said that this news showed that "the pandemic is not over". Scientists maintained the increase was due to the BA.2 version of Omicron being more transmissible, additionally more people were mixing socially and the effectiveness of booster vaccines was beginning to wane. There were calls to extend the numbers of people who will be offered a fourth dose of vaccine.

=== April 2022 ===
The end of obligatory facemasks in certain settings was delayed in Scotland until 18 April. This took place without another delay. It was the last legal restriction on personal behaviour remaining in force in the UK. Having begun April at record levels, cases began to decline as the month progressed. Meanwhile, the removal of restrictions continued to receive criticism, including from leaders within the NHS.

The High Court ruled the government had been wrong to discharge patients from hospitals to care homes putting care home resident at risk, before COVID tests became available in spring 2020. Boris Johnson maintained in parliament that he had not known about asymptomic transmission at the time. The Guardian wrote, "Johnson told the House of Commons: “What we didn’t know in particular was that Covid could be transmitted asymptomatically.” However, the prime minister commented on papers examining the issue at a Covid press conference on 25 March – several weeks before rules were altered to ensure that all patients were tested before they were admitted to a care home. At the press conference, he asked chief scientific adviser Patrick Vallance about reports that many people could have the disease without symptoms. “Patrick, on the numbers of people who have the disease asymptomatically, there was a study I saw quoted from some Oxford academics saying that as many as 50% may have had it asymptomatically,” he said. “How do you evaluate that at this stage?”

=== 2022 onwards: Transition to "living with COVID" ===
By early 2022, most legal COVID-19 restrictions across the UK had been lifted. In England, the remaining domestic restrictions, including the legal requirement to self-isolate after a positive test, ended on 24 February 2022. Similar easing occurred in the devolved nations shortly afterwards, with the last significant legal requirements (such as mandatory face coverings in certain settings in Scotland) removed by April 2022.

Free mass testing was phased out from April 2022 onwards, shifting surveillance to routine health monitoring systems. The UK moved to a "living with COVID" approach, treating the virus as an ongoing endemic respiratory illness alongside seasonal flu. Vaccination programmes continued with seasonal boosters for vulnerable groups, but routine adult boosters largely ended by 2025–2026.

As of early 2026, COVID-19 continues to circulate at low levels with occasional waves, monitored through the UK Health Security Agency (UKHSA) and Office for National Statistics (ONS) surveillance. There are no remaining COVID-19-specific legal restrictions in the UK.

== See also ==
- Timeline of the COVID-19 pandemic in the United Kingdom (January–June 2020)
- Timeline of the COVID-19 pandemic in the United Kingdom (July–December 2020)
- Timeline of the COVID-19 pandemic in the United Kingdom (January–June 2021)
- Timeline of the COVID-19 pandemic in the United Kingdom (July–December 2021)
- Timeline of the COVID-19 pandemic in the United Kingdom (January–June 2022)
- Timeline of the COVID-19 pandemic in the United Kingdom (July–December 2022)
- Timeline of the COVID-19 pandemic in the United Kingdom (2023)
- Timeline of the COVID-19 pandemic in the United Kingdom (2024)
- Timeline of the COVID-19 pandemic
