= ACDP =

ACDP may refer to:

- African Christian Democratic Party, a South African conservative political party founded in 1993
- Advisory Committee on Dangerous Pathogens, a UK non-departmental public body established in 1981
