= Ian Brown (disambiguation) =

Ian Brown (born 1963) is an English musician and lead singer of band The Stone Roses.

Ian Brown may also refer to:

- Ian Brown (footballer, born 1965), English footballer and manager
- Ian Brown (Australian footballer) (1925–2019), Australian rules footballer
- Ian Brown (journalist) (born 1954), Canadian journalist, author and radio broadcaster
- Ian Brown (swimmer) (born 1965), Australian swimmer
- Ian Brown (director) (born 1951), artistic director of West Yorkshire Playhouse, England
- Ian Brown (sailor) (born 1954), Australian Olympic sailor
- Ian Brown (virologist), British scientist and member of the New and Emerging Respiratory Virus Threats Advisory Group

== See also ==
- Ian Browne (disambiguation)
