= List of statutory instruments of the United Kingdom, 2012 =

This is an incomplete list of statutory instruments published in the United Kingdom in the year 2012.

== Statutory instruments ==
=== 1-500 ===
==== 1–100 ====
Number	Additional number	Title
Current status	Date of effect	Parent Act

2012/1	-	West Lindsey (Electoral Changes) Order 2012
Not Yet in Force (Note: Art 1(2)(a) of the West Lindsey (Electoral Changes) Order 2012)	15 October 2014 (Note: Art 1(2)(a) of the West Lindsey (Electoral Changes) Order 2012)	Local Democracy, Economic Development and Construction Act 2009, s 59(1) (Note: Preamble of the West Lindsey (Electoral Changes) Order 2012)

2012/2	-	Swindon (Electoral Changes) Order 2012
Partially in Force (Note: Art 1(2)(a) of the Swindon (Electoral Changes) Order 2012)	4 January 2012 (Note: Art 1(2)(a) of the Swindon (Electoral Changes) Order 2012)	Local Democracy, Economic Development and Construction Act 2009, s 59(1) (Note: Preamble of the Swindon (Electoral Changes) Order 2012)

2012/3	-	Hartlepool (Electoral Changes) Order 2012
Partially in Force (Note: Art 1(2)(a) of the Hartlepool (Electoral Changes) Order 2012)	4 January 2012 (Note: Art 1(2)(a) of the Hartlepool (Electoral Changes) Order 2012)	Local Democracy, Economic Development and Construction Act 2009, s 59(1) (Note: Preamble of the Hartlepool (Electoral Changes) Order 2012)

2012/4	-	Rugby (Electoral Changes) Order 2012
Partially in Force (Note: Art 1(2)(a) of the Rugby (Electoral Changes) Order 2012)	4 January 2012 (Note: Art 1(2)(a) of the Rugby (Electoral Changes) Order 2012)	Local Democracy, Economic Development and Construction Act 2009, s 59(1) (Note: Preamble of the Rugby (Electoral Changes) Order 2012)

2012/5	W 1	M4 Motorway (Brynglas Tunnels, Newport) (Temporary Traffic Restriction & Prohibitions) Order 2012
In Force	6 January 2012	Road Traffic Regulation Act 1984, ss 4, 7 & 14(1)

2012/6	W 2	A55 Trunk Road (Conwy Tunnel, Conwy) (Temporary Traffic Restriction & Prohibitions) Order 2012
In Force	8 January 2012	Road Traffic Regulation Act 1984, ss 4, 7 & 14(1)

2012/7	W 3	A4042 Trunk Road (Turnpike Roundabout to Mamhilad Roundabout, Torfaen) (Temporary Traffic Restrictions & Prohibitions) Order 2012
In Force	8 January 2012	Road Traffic Regulation Act 1984, ss 4 & 14(1)

2012/8	-	School Admissions (Admission Arrangements and Co-ordination of Admission Arrangements) (England) Regulations 2012
In Force	1 February 2012	School Standards and Framework Act 1998, ss 88B, 88C, 88E, 88F, 88H, 88K, 88M, 88N, 88O, 88Q, 82, 100, 102 & 138(7); Education Act 1996, s 29(5)

2012/9	-	School Admissions (Appeals Arrangements) (England) Regulations 2012
In Force	9 February 2012	School Standards and Framework Act 1998, ss 94(5), 94(5A), 95(5C), 95(3-3B) & 138(7)

2012/10	-	School Admissions (Infant Class Sizes) (England) Regulations 2012
In Force	1 February 2012	School Standards and Framework Act 1998, ss 1 & 138(7)

2012/11	W 4	A48 and A40 Trunk Roads (St Clears to Cross Hands, Carmarthenshire) (Temporary Traffic Restrictions and Prohibition) Order 2012
In Force	9 January 2012	Road Traffic Regulation Act 1984, ss 4 & 14(1)

2012/12	-	Traffic Management Act 2004 (Amendment of Schedule 7) (City of Exeter) Regulations 2012
In Force	30 January 2012	Traffic Management Act 2004, Sch 7 Para 5(1)

2012/13	-	Spring Traps Approval (England) Order 2012
In Force	15 February 2012	Pests Act 1954, ss 7 & 8(3)

2012/14	W 5	Assembly Learning Grants and Loans (Higher Education) (Wales) (No.2) (Amendment) Regulations 2012
In Force	1 February 2012	Teaching and Higher Education Act 1998, ss 22 & 42(6)

2012/15	-	Greater London Authority (Consolidated Council Tax Requirement Procedure) Regulations 2012
In Force	31 January 2012	Greater London Authority Act 1999, Sch 6 Para 10

2012/16	-	M27 Motorway (Junctions 11 – 12) (Temporary Restriction and Prohibition of Traffic) Order 2012
In Force	7 January 2012	Road Traffic Regulation Act 1984, s 14(1)(a) & Sch 9 Para 27(1)

2012/17	-	Nursing and Midwifery Council (Fitness to Practise) (Amendment) Rules 2011 Order of Council 2012
In Force	6 February 2012	Health Act 1999, ss 60 & 62(4); by virtue of the Nursing and Midwifery Order 2001, Arts 26(3), 30(9), 32(1)-(2) & 47(2)

2012/18	-	Education (Head Teachers’ Qualifications) (England) (Revocation) Regulations 2012
In Force	8 February 2012	Education Act 2002, s 135

2012/19	W 6	A477 Trunk Road (Kilgetty, Pembrokeshire) (Temporary Traffic Restrictions and Prohibition) Order 2012
In Force	6 January 2012	Road Traffic Regulation Act 1984, ss 4 & 14(1)

2012/20	-	Local Government (Structural Changes) (Finance) (Amendment) Regulations 2012
In Force	25 January 2012	Local Government and Public Involvement in Health Act 2007, ss 14 & 240(10)

2012/21	W 7	A487 Trunk Road (Fishguard, Pembrokeshire) (Temporary Traffic Restrictions and Prohibition) Order 2012
In Force	16 January 2012	Road Traffic Regulation Act 1984, ss 4 & 14(1)

2012/22	W 8	A470 Trunk Road (Coed y Celyn, Conwy) (Temporary Traffic Restrictions and Prohibition) Order 2012
In Force	16 January 2012	Road Traffic Regulation Act 1984, ss 4 & 14(1)

2012/23	W 9	A4060 Trunk Road (Pentrebach, Merthyr Tydfil) (Temporary Prohibition of Vehicles) Order 2012
In Force	15 January 2012	Road Traffic Regulation Act 1984, ss 4 & 14(1)

2012/24	-	Non-Domestic Rating (Collection and Enforcement) (Amendment) (England) Regulations 2012
In Force	15 February 2012	Local Government Finance Act 1988, s 143(2) & Sch 9 Paras 1–4

2012/25	-	Non-Domestic Rating (Electronic Communications) (England) Order 2012
In Force	15 February 2012	Electronic Communications Act 2000, s 8

2012/26	-	A27 Trunk Road (Selmeston – Firle) (Temporary Restriction and Prohibition of Traffic) Order 2011 Variation Order 2012
In Force	14 January 2012	Road Traffic Regulation Act 1984, s 14(1)(a) & Sch 9 Para 27(1)

2012/27	-	A27 Trunk Road and the A23 Trunk Road (Patcham Interchange) (Temporary Restriction and Prohibition of Traffic) Order 2012
In Force	14 January 2012	Road Traffic Regulation Act 1984, s 14(1)(a)

2012/28	-	A30 Trunk Road (Okehampton) (Temporary Prohibition of Traffic) Order 2012
In Force	11 January 2012	Road Traffic Regulation Act 1984, s 14(1)(a)

2012/29	-	A14 Trunk Road (Junction 23 Spittals Interchange to Junction 24 Godmanchester Interchange, Cambridgeshire) (Temporary Restriction and Prohibition of Traffic) Order 2012
In Force	10 January 2012	Road Traffic Regulation Act 1984, s 14(1)(a)

2012/30	-	A14 Trunk Road (Junction 57 Nacton and Junction 56 Wherstead, Ipswich, Suffolk) Westbound (Temporary Restriction and Prohibition of Traffic) Order 2012
In Force	10 January 2012	Road Traffic Regulation Act 1984, s 14(1)(a)

2012/31	-	M53 Motorway (Junctions 4-1 Northbound and Southbound Carriageways and Slip Roads) (Temporary Prohibition and Restriction of Traffic) Order 2012
In Force	8 January 2012	Road Traffic Regulation Act 1984, ss 7 & 14(1)(a)

2012/32	-	M1 Motorway (South of Junction 15 to Junction 13) Southbound (Temporary 50 Miles Per Hour Speed Restriction) Order 2012
In Force	10 January 2012	Road Traffic Regulation Act 1984, ss 7 & 14(1)(a)

2012/33	-	Value Added Tax (Amendment) Regulations 2012
Not Yet in Force	1 February 2012	Value Added Tax Act 1994, s 25(1) & Sch 11 Paras 2(1) & 11; Finance Act 1999, ss 132 & 133; Finance Act 2003, ss 135 & 136

2012/34	-	M6 (Junctions 2–3) and M69 Motorways (Temporary Restriction and Prohibition of Traffic) Order 2012
In Force	10 January 2012	Road Traffic Regulation Act 1984, s 14(1)(a)

2012/35	-	A14 Trunk Road (Junction 12) (Thrapston, Northamptonshire) (Slip Road) (Temporary Prohibition of Traffic) Order 2012
In Force	10 January 2012	Road Traffic Regulation Act 1984, s 14(1)(a)

2012/36	-	A180 Trunk Road (Brocklesby Interchange) (Temporary Prohibition of Traffic) Order 2012
In Force	8 January 2012	Road Traffic Regulation Act 1984, s 14(1)(a)

2012/37	-	A64 Trunk Road (Hopgrove Roundabout to Whitwell) (Temporary 40 Miles Per Hour Speed Restriction) Order 2012
In Force	8 January 2012	Road Traffic Regulation Act 1984, s 14(1)(a)

2012/38	-	M1 Motorway (Junction 40 and Junction 41) (Temporary Prohibition of Traffic) Order 2012
In Force	8 January 2012	Road Traffic Regulation Act 1984, s 14(1)(a)

2012/39	-	A64 Trunk Road (Brambling Fields Interchange) (Temporary Restriction and Prohibition of Traffic) Order 2012
In Force	8 January 2012	Road Traffic Regulation Act 1984, s 14(1)(a)

2012/40	-	M1 Motorway (Junction 34) and the A631 Trunk Road (Tinsley Viaduct) (Temporary Prohibition of Traffic) Order 2012
In Force	8 January 2012	Road Traffic Regulation Act 1984, s 14(1)(a)

2012/41	-	A1 Trunk Road (Denwick to Charlton Mires) (Temporary Restriction and Prohibition of Traffic) Order 2012
In Force	8 January 2012	Road Traffic Regulation Act 1984, s 14(1)(a)

2012/42	-	A184 Trunk Road (Whitemare Pool Interchange) (Temporary Prohibition of Traffic) Order 2012
In Force	8 January 2012	Road Traffic Regulation Act 1984, s 14(1)(a)

2012/43	-	A1 Trunk Road (Stannington Interchange to Warreners House Interchange) (Temporary Restriction and Prohibition of Traffic) Order 2012
In Force	8 January 2012	Road Traffic Regulation Act 1984, ss 7 & 14(1)(a)

2012/44	-	A19 Trunk Road (Seaton Burn Interchange) (Temporary 50 Miles Per Hour Speed Restriction) Order 2012
In Force	8 January 2012	Road Traffic Regulation Act 1984, s 14(1)(a)

2012/45	-	A36 Trunk Road (Salisbury to Whaddon) (Temporary Prohibition of Traffic) Order 2012
In Force	13 January 2012	Road Traffic Regulation Act 1984, s 14(1)(a)

2012/46	W 10, C 1	Welsh Language (Wales) Measure 2011 (Commencement No.2) Order 2012
In Force	9 January 2012	Welsh Language (Wales) Measure 2011, ss 150(5) & 156(2)

2012/47	-	Specified Products from China (Restriction on First Placing on the Market) (England) (Amendment) Regulations 2012
In Force	12 January 2012	European Communities Act 1972, s 2(2)

2012/48	W 11	St Clears to Pembroke Dock Trunk Road (A477) (St Clears – Red Roses Improvement and De-Trunking) Order 2012
In Force	18 January 2012	Highways Act 1980, ss 10 & 12

2012/49	W 12	A55 Trunk Road (Junction 25 (Bodelwyddan) to Junction 28 (Rhuallt), Denbighshire) (Temporary Traffic Restriction & Prohibitions) Order 2012
In Force	16 January 2012	Road Traffic Regulation Act 1984, ss 4 & 14(1)(a)

2012/50	-	Closure of Prisons Order 2012
In Force	8 February 2012	Prison Act 1952, s 37

2012/51	-	Huntingdonshire (Electoral Changes) Order 2012
Not Yet in Force	15 October 2012	Local Government and Public Involvement in Health Act 2007, s 92(3)

2012/52	-	Filton College and Stroud College of Further Education (Dissolution) Order 2012
In Force	1 February 2012	Further and Higher Education Act 1992, s 27

2012/53	-	M5 Motorway (Junctions 13–14, Michaelwood Services) (Temporary Prohibition of Traffic) Order 2012
In Force	7 January 2012	Road Traffic Regulation Act 1984, s 14(1)(a) & Sch 9 Para 27(1)

2012/54	-	A38 Trunk Road (Trerulefoot Roundabout to Stoketon Cross, Near Saltash) (Temporary Prohibition and Restriction of Traffic) Order 2012
In Force	7 January 2012	Road Traffic Regulation Act 1984, s 14(1)(a)

2012/55	-	A50 Trunk Road (M1 Junction 24a, Leicestershire) (Temporary Prohibition of Traffic) Order 2012
In Force	11 January 2012	Road Traffic Regulation Act 1984, s 14(1)(a)

2012/56	-	Libya (Asset-Freezing) (Amendment) Regulations
In Force (Note: s 1 of the Libya (Asset-Freezing) (Amendment) Regulations)	11 January 2012 (Note: s 1 of the Libya (Asset-Freezing) (Amendment) Regulations)	European Communities Act 1972, s 2(2) (Note: Preamble of the Libya (Asset-Freezing) (Amendment) Regulations)

==== 301–400 ====
- Banchory and Crathes Light Railway Order 2012 (SI 2012/345)

=== 501-1000 ===
==== 601-700 ====
- Control of Asbestos Regulations 2012 (SI 2012/632)

=== 1001-1500 ===
==== 1101–1200 ====
2012/1199 – The Apprenticeships (Alternative English Completion Conditions) Regulations 2012, made under section 1(5) and 262(3) of the Apprenticeships, Skills, Children and Learning Act 2009. See Apprenticeships#Structure of apprenticeships in 2000s.

- Human Medicines Regulations 2012 (SI 2012/1619)

== 3001–3500 ==
=== 3101-3200 ===
Number	Additional number	Title
Current status	Date of effect	Parent Act

2012/3110	-	Consumer Rights (Payment Surcharges) Regulations 2012
In Force	6 April 2013	European Communities Act 1972, s 2(2)

2012/3113	-	Cumbria (Electoral Changes) Order 2012
In Force	2 May 2013	Local Democracy, Economic Development and Construction Act 2009, s 59(1)

- SI 2012/3173 – Public Services (Social Value) Act 2012 (Commencement) Order 2012

== See also ==
- List of statutory instruments of the United Kingdom
