= Ian Browne =

Ian Browne may refer to:

- Ian Browne (cyclist) (1931–2023), Australian Olympic champion cyclist
- Ian Browne (musician) (born 1973), former drummer for the Matthew Good Band

== See also ==
- Ian Brown (disambiguation)
