= New and Emerging Respiratory Virus Threats Advisory Group =

UK governmental advisory body

The New and Emerging Respiratory Virus Threats Advisory Group (NERVTAG) is an advisory body that advises the United Kingdom Government's Chief Medical Advisor / Chief Medical Officer for England, who in turn advises the UK Department of Health and Social Care and relevant ministers regarding threats from viral respiratory tract infections. The body replaced the UK Scientific Pandemic Influenza Advisory Committee (SPI) as part of a move to expand the scope to cover the threat of other respiratory viruses, besides pandemic influenza. The inaugural meeting was held on 19 December 2014 where the terms of reference were agreed. The group has been advising the Department of Health for some years and minutes of meetings are now regularly published, backdated to 2014. As of 2020, the group has been advising specifically on the COVID-19 pandemic.

== Developments ==
On 18 December 2020, a telecon meeting took place where the SARS-Cov-2 variant, Variant of Concern 202012/01, was discussed. A summary recorded in the advisory group's minutes stated that they had "moderate confidence" that there was "a substantial increase in transmissibility" with Variant of Concern 202012/01 over other variants. A summary presented to the United Kingdom Government's Scientific Advisory Group for Emergencies on 21 January 2021 recorded "a realistic possibility that infection with VOCB.1.1.7 is associated with an increased risk of death compared to infection with non-VOC viruses".

== Members ==
As of July 2020, its members were:

- Professor Peter Horby (chair), epidemiologist, University of Oxford
- Professor Wendy Barclay, virologist, Imperial College London
- Professor Robert Dingwall, sociologist, Dingwall Enterprises Ltd. and Nottingham Trent University
- Professor John Edmunds, epidemiologist, London School of Hygiene and Tropical Medicine
- Dr Cariad Evans, Sheffield Teaching Hospitals NHS Foundation Trust
- Professor Neil Ferguson, epidemiologist, Medical Research Council, Imperial College London
- Professor Andrew Hayward, epidemiologist, University College London
- Dr Benjamin Killingley, medical consultant, University College London Hospitals NHS Foundation Trust
- Professor Wei Shen Lim, medical consultant, Nottingham University Hospitals NHS Trust
- Dr Jim McMenamin, immunologist, Health Protection Scotland
- Professor Peter Openshaw, immunologist, Imperial College London
- Dr James Rubin, psychologist, King's College London
- Professor Calum Semple, consultant paediatrician, University of Liverpool
- Dr Chloe Sellwood (Co-opted Member), Pandemic Flu Lead at NHS England
- Professor Ian Brown (Co-opted Member), virologist, Animal and Plant Health Agency (APHA)

== See also ==
- Scientific Advisory Group for Emergencies
- Advisory Committee on Dangerous Pathogens
- Joint Committee on Vaccination and Immunisation
- Vaccine Taskforce (UK)
