= Human Medicines Regulations 2012 =

United Kingdom Statutory Instrument

- Statutory Instrument
- Parliament of the United Kingdom
- Citation: SI 2012/1916
- Territorial extent: United Kingdom

Dates
- Made: 19 July 2012
- Laid before Parliament: 24 July 2012
- Commencement: 14 August 2012

Other legislation
- Amends: Medicines Act 1968; Value Added Tax Act 1994
- Transposes: Directive 2010/84/EU
- Amended by: Human Medicines (Coronavirus and Influenza) (Amendment) Regulations 2020

Status: Amended

Text of statute as originally enacted

Revised text of statute as amended

Text of the Human Medicines Regulations 2012 as in force today (including any amendments) within the United Kingdom, from legislation.gov.uk.

The Human Medicines Regulations 2012 (SI 2012/1916) in the United Kingdom were created, under statutory authority of the European Communities Act 1972 and the Medicines Act 1968 in 2012. The body responsible for their upkeep is the Medicines and Healthcare products Regulatory Agency. The regulations partially repealed the Medicines Act 1968 in line with EU legislation.

== Amendments ==
In October 2020, the regulations were amended to expand the workforce eligible to administer COVID-19 vaccines, so enabling additional healthcare professionals to vaccinate the public. This was a temporary provision, but in January 2022 it was announced that this would be made permanent as would the provision for community pharmacy contractors to provide COVID-19 and flu vaccines “away from their normal registered premises”.

== Regulation 174 ==
Regulation 174 provides an exemption to the requirement for authorisation of Regulation 46, allowing for the sale or supply of any medicinal product to be temporarily authorised by the licensing authority (MHRA) in response to the suspected or confirmed spread of pathogenic agents, toxins, chemical agents or nuclear radiation.
