= Robert Dingwall =

British sociologist and academic (born 1950)

Robert Dingwall FAcSS
- Born: Robert William James Dingwall; 6 August 1950 (age 76)

Academic background
- Education: University of Cambridge; University of Aberdeen
- Thesis: The social organisation of health visitor training (1974)

Academic work
- Discipline: Sociology
- Sub-discipline: Medical sociology; sociology of law; Sociology of science
- Institutions: University of Aberdeen; Faculty of Law, University of Oxford; Wolfson College, Oxford; University of Nottingham

Robert William James Dingwall FAcSS (born 6 August 1950) is a British sociologist and academic, specialising in medical sociology. He was Professor of Sociology at the University of Nottingham from 1990 to 2010 and at Nottingham Trent University 2010–22. He has Emeritus status at both universities. His research is on the interdisciplinary study of law, medicine, science and technology.

== Early life and education ==
Dingwall was born on 6 August 1950. He attended the independent St Peter's School, York from 1963 to 1968.

At St John's College, Cambridge, Dingwall studied economics for part I of the Tripos and then switched to social and political science for part II, graduating with a Bachelor of Arts (BA) degree in 1971: as per tradition, his BA was promoted to a Master of Arts (MA Cantab) degree. He then studied medical sociology at the University of Aberdeen, graduating with a Doctor of Philosophy (PhD) degree in 1974. His doctoral thesis was titled "The social organisation of health visitor training".

== Career ==
From 1975 to 1977, after completing his doctorate, Dingwall was a research fellow in the Institute of Medical Sociology at the University of Aberdeen. From 1978 to 1990, he worked at the University of Oxford: he was a research officer, then senior research officer, and finally a research fellow at its Centre for Socio-Legal Studies and Wolfson College, Oxford. He was Professor of Sociology at the University of Nottingham until 2010, where he founded the Institute for Science and Society, subsequently moving to Nottingham Trent University. He was elected Fellow of the Academy of Social Sciences (FAcSS) in 2002: he was a member of its council from 2013 to 2019. He is an Honorary Member of the Faculty of Public Health.

He has served on NERVTAG, a scientific advisory panel for epidemic preparedness of HMG. He has chaired the Bioscience for Society Strategy Panel of the Biotechnology and Biological Sciences Research Council and previously served as a member of the Committee on Ethical Aspects of Pandemic Influenza and of the Civil Justice Council. He has also been a consultant to industry on the ethical use of pharmaceuticals. He has also received commissions from the Royal Pharmaceutical Society and the Food Standards Agency.

=== Public engagement (COVID-19) ===
In early May 2020, during the COVID-19 pandemic, Dingwall criticised the Government's messaging, for making people fearful that the disease would kill them and argued that restrictions on meeting outdoors should be relaxed to allow people to come within 1.5 metres of each other.

On 18 July, Dingwall criticised another SAGE report, which forecasted 120,000 deaths from COVID-19 in wintertime 2020–21. In his estimation, this "was based on flawed mathematics" and created an "environment of fear".
