= Andrew Hayward (epidemiologist) =

University academic into infectious disease epidemiology

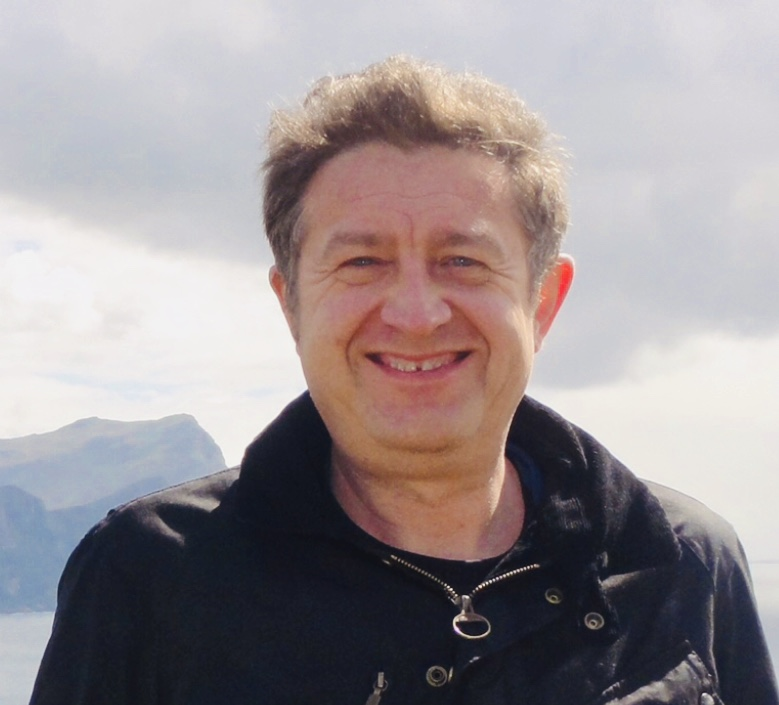
- Born: April 1966 (age 60); Birmingham, England

Academic background
- Education: St Thomas's Hospital Medical School: Liverpool School of Tropical Medicine; University College London

Academic work
- Discipline: Epidemiology and Public Health
- Institutions: University College London; University of Nottingham

Andrew C. Hayward (born April 1966) is professor of infectious disease epidemiology and inclusion health research at University College London.

== Research ==
Hayward was one of the founders of Flu Watch in 2006, designed to understand transmission of influenza in the general community. As well as continuing surveillance it has provided data for modelling flu epidemiology. Previously, models were based data from the USA between 1948 and 1981 that was collected in very different social, travel and community settings. Participant households in England were invited to join after being selected at random from the lists of volunteer general practitioners.

His research includes developing health intervention methods for people experiencing homelessness, drug users and people in prisons.

He was a member of the UK SAGE sub-committee NERVTAG – New and Emerging Respiratory Virus Threats Advisory Group – that played a key role in advising the UK government during the COVID-19 pandemic.

== Awards ==
In 2017, he was awarded the UCL Student Choice Award for Outstanding Post Graduate Research Supervision. In 2019, he was appointed Senior Investigator at the National Institute for Health and Care Research (NIHR).

He has a H-index of 57 on Google scholar.
