= Human Medicines (Coronavirus and Influenza) (Amendment) Regulations 2020 =

Amendment Regulations for Human Medicines (Coronavirus and Influenza) in England

- Statutory Instrument
- Parliament of the United Kingdom
- Citation: SI 2020/1125
- Introduced by: Matt Hancock, Secretary of State for Health and Social Care
- Territorial extent: England

Dates
- Made: 15 October 2020
- Laid before Parliament: 16 October 2020
- Commencement: Subject to paragraph (3) 6 November 2020 (3) This regulation and regulations 2 17 October 2020

Other legislation
- Amends: Human Medicines Regulations 2012

Status: Current legislation

Text of the Human Medicines (Coronavirus and Influenza) (Amendment) Regulations 2020 as in force today (including any amendments) within the United Kingdom, from legislation.gov.uk.

The Human Medicines (Coronavirus and Influenza) (Amendment) Regulations 2020 (SI 2020/1125) is a statutory instrument (SI) that was laid before Parliament on 16 October 2020 to make provision for the strengthening of existing regulations that allow for the temporary authorisation of the supply of unlicensed medicines, including vaccines, in response to certain public health threats, and for the expansion of the workforce able to administer the COVID-19 vaccines and influenza vaccines. Certain amendments within the instrument, regulations 3, 12 and 3, allowing for the administration of vaccines by a wider range of medically trained people such as an "occupational health vaccinator" are time-limited to 1 April 2022.

The statutory instrument also makes provision for temporary authorisations where the existing partial immunity (for registered healthcare professionals) from civil liability is extended to pharmaceutical companies in relation to temporarily authorised medicinal products.

== Regulation 174A ==
A new regulation (174A) has been added to Regulation 174 of the Human Medicines Regulations 2012 which will provide temporary authorisation for the promotion of medicinal products, including COVID-19 vaccines, in limited forms of advertisements where permitted in campaigns "relating to the suspected or confirmed spread of pathogenic agents". The existing regulations under the Human Medicines Regulations 2012 for the disapplication of certain advertising restrictions for unlicensed vaccines are expanded by these regulations to permit temporary authorisation of any medicinal products for the purposes of any campaign approved by ministers.

=== Temporary authorisation of vaccine BNT162b2 ===
On 2 December 2020, a temporary authorisation was issued under Regulation 174 of the Human Medicines Regulations 2012 (as amended by Regulation 174A) for the implementation of the first COVID-19 vaccine, the Pfizer/BioNTech (BNT162b2), to be used in the United Kingdom. The authorisation was subject to a number of conditions which fall under Regulation 174A(1) of these amending regulations. The temporary authorisation meant that a new COVID-19 vaccine could be approved by the MHRA without having to wait for the usual approval of the European Medicines Agency.

== See also ==
- COVID-19 vaccination programme in the United Kingdom
- MHRA - Notable Interventions
