= Ian Brown (virologist) =

British virologist

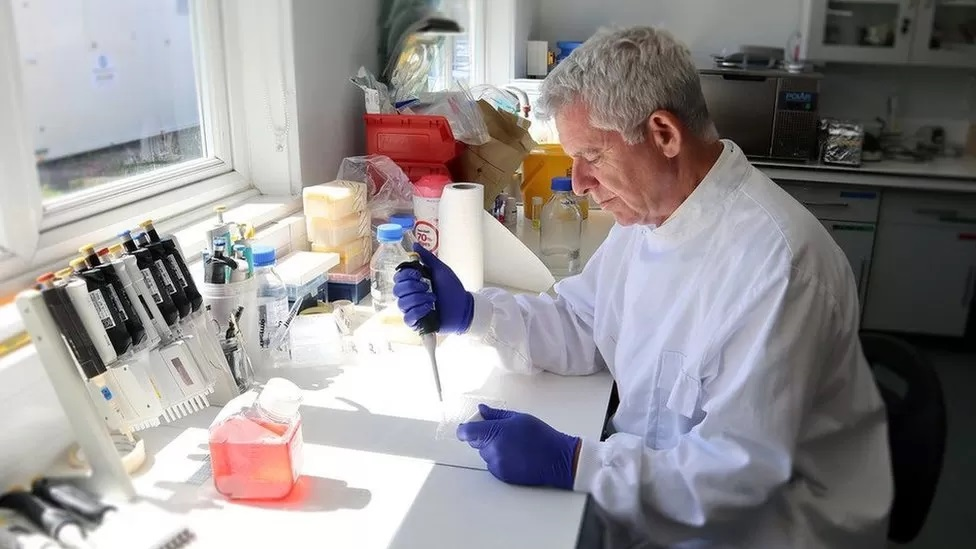
Professor Ian Brown at work at the APHA

Ian H. Brown OBE MIBiol is a British virologist and member of the New and Emerging Respiratory Virus Threats Advisory Group as of July 2020.
