= Advisory Committee on Dangerous Pathogens =

UK-wide governmental advisory committee

The Advisory Committee on Dangerous Pathogens (ACDP) is a UK-wide advisory committee. It was established in 1981, and the terms of reference were revised in 1991 to allow for a wider remit.

== Description ==
The terms of reference of the ACDP are:

"To provide as requested independent scientific advice to the Health and Safety Executive, and to Ministers through the Department of Health, the Department for Environment, Food and Rural Affairs, and their counterparts under devolution in Scotland, Wales and Northern Ireland, on all aspects of hazards and risks to workers and others from exposure to pathogens. In addition, to provide as requested independent scientific risk assessment advice on transmissible spongiform encephalopathies (TSEs) to Ministers through the Department of Health, the Department for Environment, Food and Rural Affairs, and their counterparts under devolution in Scotland, Wales and Northern Ireland and to the Food Standards Agency."

The Committee comprises a Chairman and up to 17 members. The membership includes scientific and medical experts, representing a range of disciplines.

On 31 December 2012, the Committee was reconstituted from an advisory non-departmental public body to an Expert Advisory Committee.

== COVID-19 ==
From 19 March, Public Health England, consistent with the opinion of the Advisory Committee on Dangerous Pathogens, no longer classified COVID-19 as a "High consequence infectious disease" (HCID). This reversed an interim recommendation made in January 2020, due to more information about the disease confirming low overall mortality rates, greater clinical awareness, and a specific and sensitive laboratory test, the availability of which continues to increase. The statement said "the need to have a national, coordinated response remains" and added "this is being met by the government’s COVID-19 response". This meant cases of COVID-19 are no longer managed by HCID treatment centres only.

The decision made by the ACDP was taken at their meeting on the 13th March 2020. Following the meeting, the decision was relayed to Jonathan Van-Tam by the chairman Prof. Tom Evans. Van-Tam then informed the meeting of NERVTAG which was still in session, but nothing was passed to the SAGE meeting later that day. The same day, Tom Evans informed the DHSC of the decision by letter, then unilaterally signed off the minutes of the meeting. The matter was not discussed in any subsequent meetings of the ACDP or NERVTAG.

Prof. Neil Ferguson was a member of all three committees.

Emails of the 19th March 2020 show that the members of the Four Nations HCID Group agreed with the ACDP, many of the recipients of the emails have been redacted, but in one the Chief Medical officer, Sir Chris Whitty, is also said to agree with the downgrading.

All the relevant documents were sent to the Covid inquiry, but no questions were asked.

It would appear that the decision of the ACDP was not something the Government wanted to hear or act upon. The passing of the Coronavirus Act the following week was not impeded.

== See also ==
- Joint Committee on Vaccination and Immunisation
- New and Emerging Respiratory Virus Threats Advisory Group
- Scientific Advisory Group for Emergencies
