= COVID-19 vaccination in the United Kingdom =

Immunisation against COVID-19

COVID-19 vaccination programme in the United Kingdom
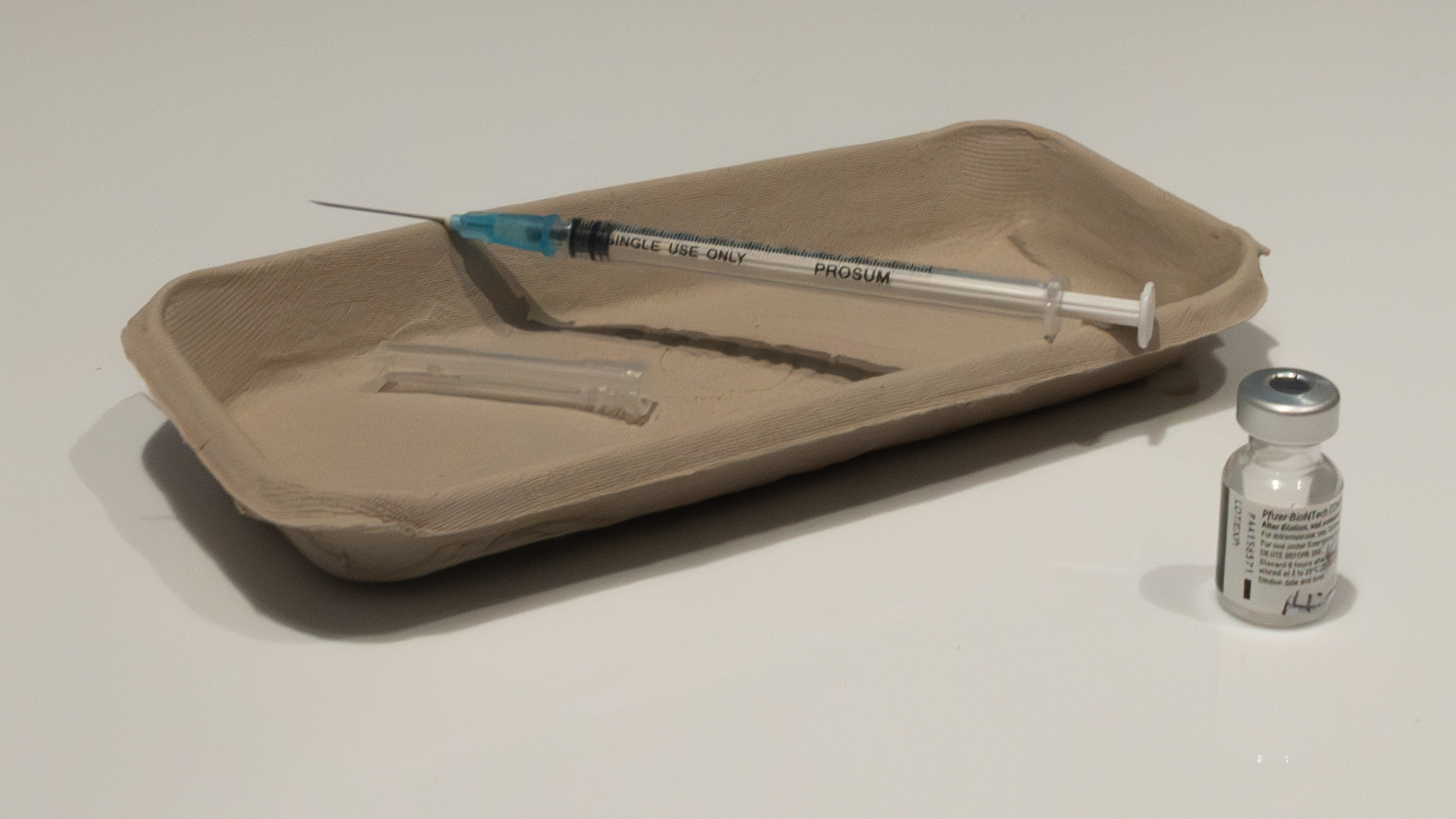
- Vial and syringe used for the vaccination of Margaret Keenan, the first COVID-19 vaccine given outside of trials
- Date: 8 December 2020 – present
- Location: United Kingdom
- Cause: COVID-19 pandemic
- Target: Immunisation of the public in the United Kingdom against COVID-19
- Participants: 53,710,109 have received one vaccine dose 50,483,527 have received two vaccine doses 40,196,024 have received three vaccine doses, 6,200,537 have received a fourth dose
- Outcome: 92.9% of UK population 12+ have received one vaccine dose 86.8% of UK population 12+ have received two vaccine doses 69% of UK population 12+ have received three vaccine doses
- Website: GOV.UK

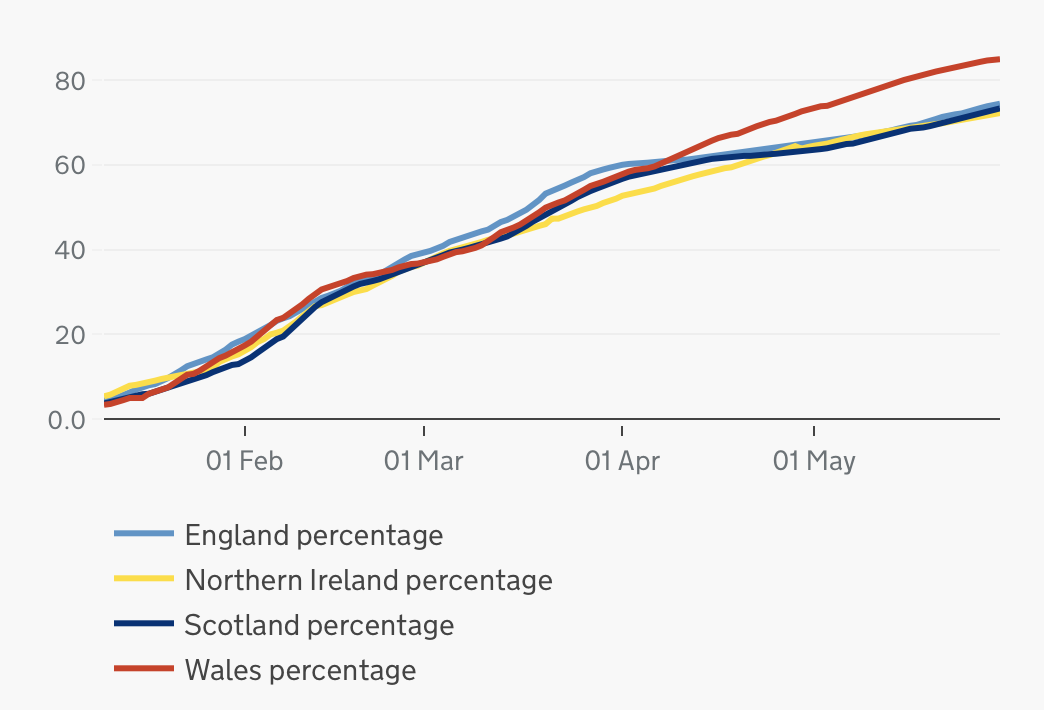
The percentage of the adult population, by nation, reported to have received 1st dose of a vaccine as of 30 May 2021

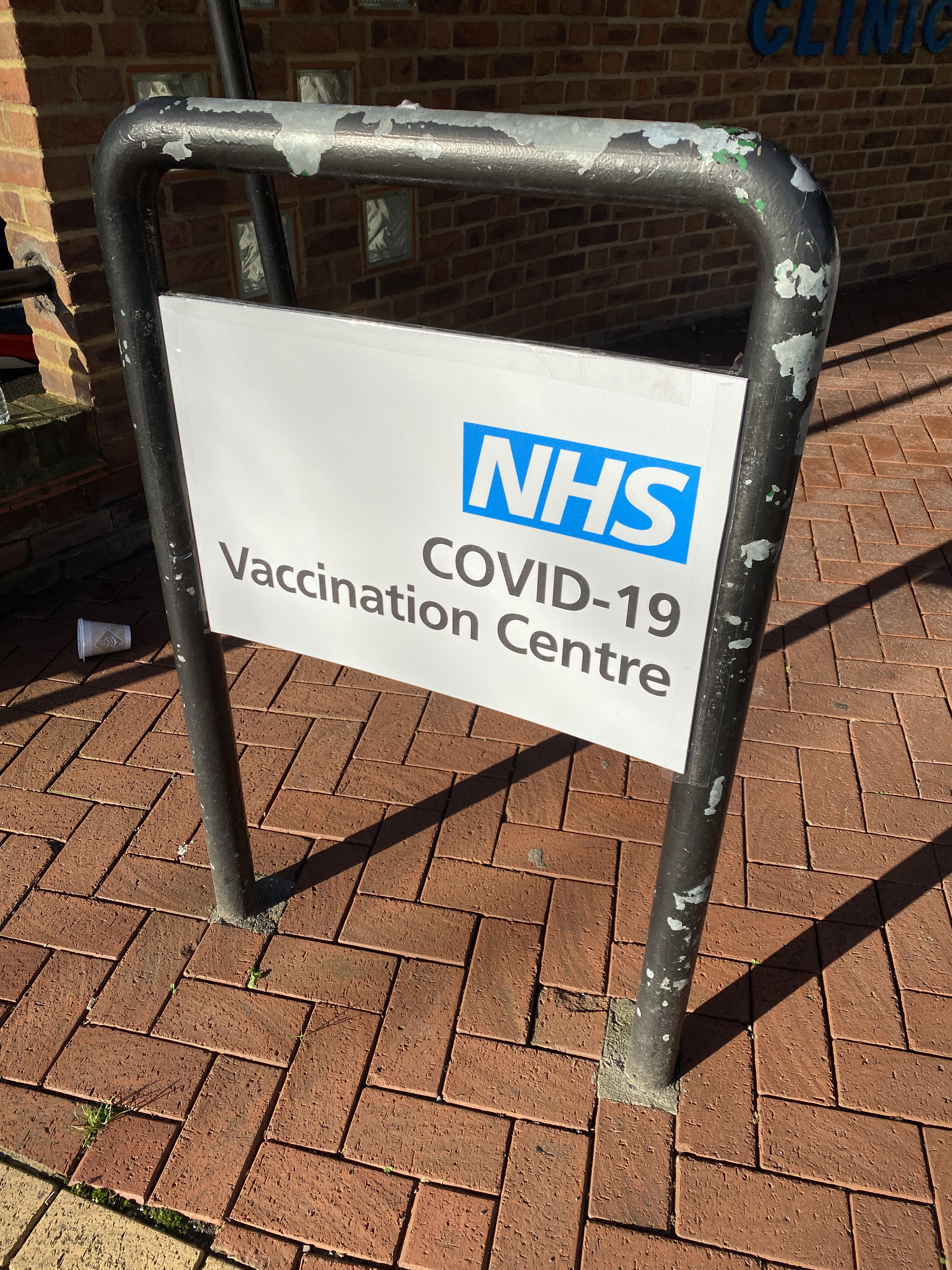
GP-led vaccination centres were in operation by 15 December 2020.

The COVID-19 vaccination programme in the United Kingdom is an ongoing mass immunisation campaign for coronavirus disease 2019 (COVID-19) during the COVID-19 pandemic in the United Kingdom.

Vaccinations began on 8 December 2020 after Margaret Keenan became the first person in the world (outside trials) to receive her first dose of two of the Pfizer–BioNTech COVID-19 vaccine. There are three vaccines currently in use; following approval of the Pfizer–BioNTech COVID-19 vaccine (Comirnaty), vaccines developed by University of Oxford and AstraZeneca (Vaxzevria), and the United States National Institute of Allergy and Infectious Diseases and Moderna (Spikevax) have been rolled out. As of 13 September 2021, there were four other COVID-19 vaccines on order for the programme, at varying stages of development.

Phase 1 of the rollout prioritised the most vulnerable, in a schedule primarily based on age. The delivery plan was adjusted on 30 December 2020, delaying second doses so that more people could receive their first dose. A target to give all 15 million people in the top four priority groups their first dose by the middle of February 2021 was announced on 4 January 2021, and achieved on 14 February 2021. The next five groups were offered a vaccine by 15 April, and 32 million doses were administered by that point. In June 2021, all adults aged 18+ were able to get their first dose of a vaccine. The vaccine rollout was expanded to adolescent children and booster doses during the later months of that year. In response to the SARS-CoV-2 Omicron variant, third vaccine doses were made available to all adults in December 2021.

The UK's rollout was among the fastest in the world with among the highest uptake in its first few months, although vaccination rates had slowed down or plateaued by autumn 2021 due to lower uptake in younger age groups. Polling suggests the UK's level of COVID-19 vaccine hesitancy is among the world's lowest.

Vaccination sites include GP practices, care homes and pharmacies, as well as hospitals. As of 21 May 2021, there were 2,057 vaccination sites operating in England. There are over 1,100 vaccination sites operating in Scotland. As of 25 May 2021, there were 462 vaccination sites operating in Wales. Additional sites, including large venues such as sports stadia, entered the programme from 11 January 2021, with seven mass vaccination centres opening in England initially and seven in Wales.

New guidance for allergy sufferers, antibody tests, new variants of SARS-CoV-2 (B.1.1.7 and B.1.617) and the use of the AstraZeneca vaccine in younger adults have been issued throughout the programme.

The programme also includes procurement of vaccines for British Overseas Territories and Crown Dependencies.

According to a June 2022 study published in The Lancet, COVID-19 vaccination in the United Kingdom prevented an additional 507,000 deaths from 8 December 2020 to 8 December 2021.

Progress, as of 6 October 2021
| Home nation | Doses administered per 100 people |
|---|---|
| United Kingdom | 140.95 |
| England | 140.20 |
| Scotland | 148.08 |
| Wales | 146.38 |
| Northern Ireland | 133.61 |
From official vaccination and 2019 ONS data. (Doses may not equate to no. people if more than one dose received.)

== Background ==
=== Responsibility for deployment ===
On 28 November 2020 the new role of Parliamentary Under-Secretary of State for COVID-19 Vaccine Deployment was set up within the Department of Health and Social Care in the Government of the United Kingdom, with Nadhim Zahawi the first to take office.

=== Vaccines on order ===
There are several COVID-19 vaccines at various stages of development around the world. By February 2021 the British Government had placed orders for a combined total of 457 million doses across 8 different vaccines, and as of 23 August 2021 this had increased to more than 540 million doses. This does not equate to the number of people that can be immunised as most vaccines require more than one dose.

In September 2021, the UK government cancelled their 190-million-dose Valneva order, citing supply concerns.

The breakdown of the vaccines currently being considered for the vaccination programme is as follows:

| Vaccine | Origin | Progress | Doses ordered | Approval | Deployment |
|---|---|---|---|---|---|
| Pfizer–BioNTech | US/Germany | phase III clinical trials | 189 million | 2 December 2020 | 8 December 2020 |
| Oxford–AstraZeneca | UK/Sweden/India | phase III clinical trials | 100 million | 30 December 2020 | 4 January 2021 |
| Moderna | US | phase III clinical trials | 77 million | 8 January 2021 | 7 April 2021 |
| Janssen (Johnson & Johnson) | US/Belgium/Netherlands | phase III clinical trials | 20 million | 28 May 2021 | Pending |
| Novavax | US/India | phase III clinical trials | 60 million | 3 February 2022 | Pending |
| GSK/Sanofi Pasteur | UK/France | phase III clinical trials | 60 million | Pending | Pending |
| CureVac | Germany | phase III clinical trials | 50 million | Pending | Pending |

== History ==
=== Regulatory approvals ===
On 2 December 2020, the UK became the first country to give approval for use of the Pfizer–BioNTech vaccine, later branded as Comirnaty. This was in the form of a temporary authorisation given by the Medicines and Healthcare products Regulatory Agency (MHRA) under Regulation 174 of the Human Medicines Regulations 2012. Regulatory approval is reserved under the devolution settlement. The first batch arrived in the UK the next day and was initially stored at an undisclosed central hub before being distributed to hospital vaccination centres across the country.

On 30 December 2020, the UK also became the first country to approve the Oxford/AstraZeneca vaccine.

On 8 January 2021, the Moderna vaccine was approved as the third vaccine to enter the programme.

On 28 January 2021, the results of the Novavax vaccine trials, which were undertaken in the UK and in South Africa, showed it was 95.6% effective against the original SARS-CoV-2 strains and 85.6% against the Variant of Concern 202012/01, then prevalent in the UK. The company stated it had begun the process of requesting clearance for use in the UK. The Novavax vaccine was the first to be tested in clinical trials for efficacy against the UK's prevailing Variant of Concern 202012/01. In clinical trial subjects without HIV infections, the vaccine was also 60% effective against the 501.V2 variant, a SARS-CoV-2 strain first detected in South Africa.

On 28 May 2021, the Janssen vaccine was the fourth vaccine to be approved in the UK.

On 3 February 2022, the Novavax vaccine was the fifth vaccine to be approved in the UK.

On 14 April 2022, the UK became the first country to approve the Valneva vaccine. This is the sixth COVID-19 vaccine that the MHRA has approved.

=== Rollout timeline ===
This timeline lists the general availability of vaccine appointments in England, by date. The dates differed slightly in Scotland, Wales and Northern Ireland (not listed here).

Availability of vaccine appointments in England, by date
| Start date | Appointments available for | Priority group | Ref |
|---|---|---|---|
| 8 December 2020 | Residents in a care home for older adults and their carers; and all aged 80 and over | 1 and part of 2 | |
| Procedures set out on 9 and 14 January 2021 | Frontline health and social care workers | Part of 2 | |
| 18 January 2021 | All aged 70 and over, and clinically extremely vulnerable individuals | 3 and 4 | |
| 15 February 2021 | All aged 65 and over; and those aged 16 to 64 with underlying health conditions which put them at higher risk of serious disease and mortality | 5 and 6 | |
| 1 March 2021 | All aged 60 and over | 7 | |
| 6 March 2021 | All aged 56 and over | 8 (age adjusted from 55) | |
| 17 March 2021 | All aged 50 and over | 9 | |
| 13 April 2021 | All aged 45 and over | | |
| 26 April 2021 | All aged 44 and over | | |
| 27 April 2021 | All aged 42 and over | | |
| 30 April 2021 | All aged 40 and over | | |
| 13 May 2021 | All aged 38 and over | | |
| 18 May 2021 | All aged 36 and over | | |
| 20 May 2021 | All aged 34 and over | | |
| 22 May 2021 | All aged 32 and over | | |
| 26 May 2021 | All aged 30 and over | | |
| 8 June 2021 | All aged 25 and over | | |
| 15 June 2021 | All aged 23 and over | | |
| 16 June 2021 | All aged 21 and over | | |
| 18 June 2021 | All adults (ie aged 18 and over) | | |

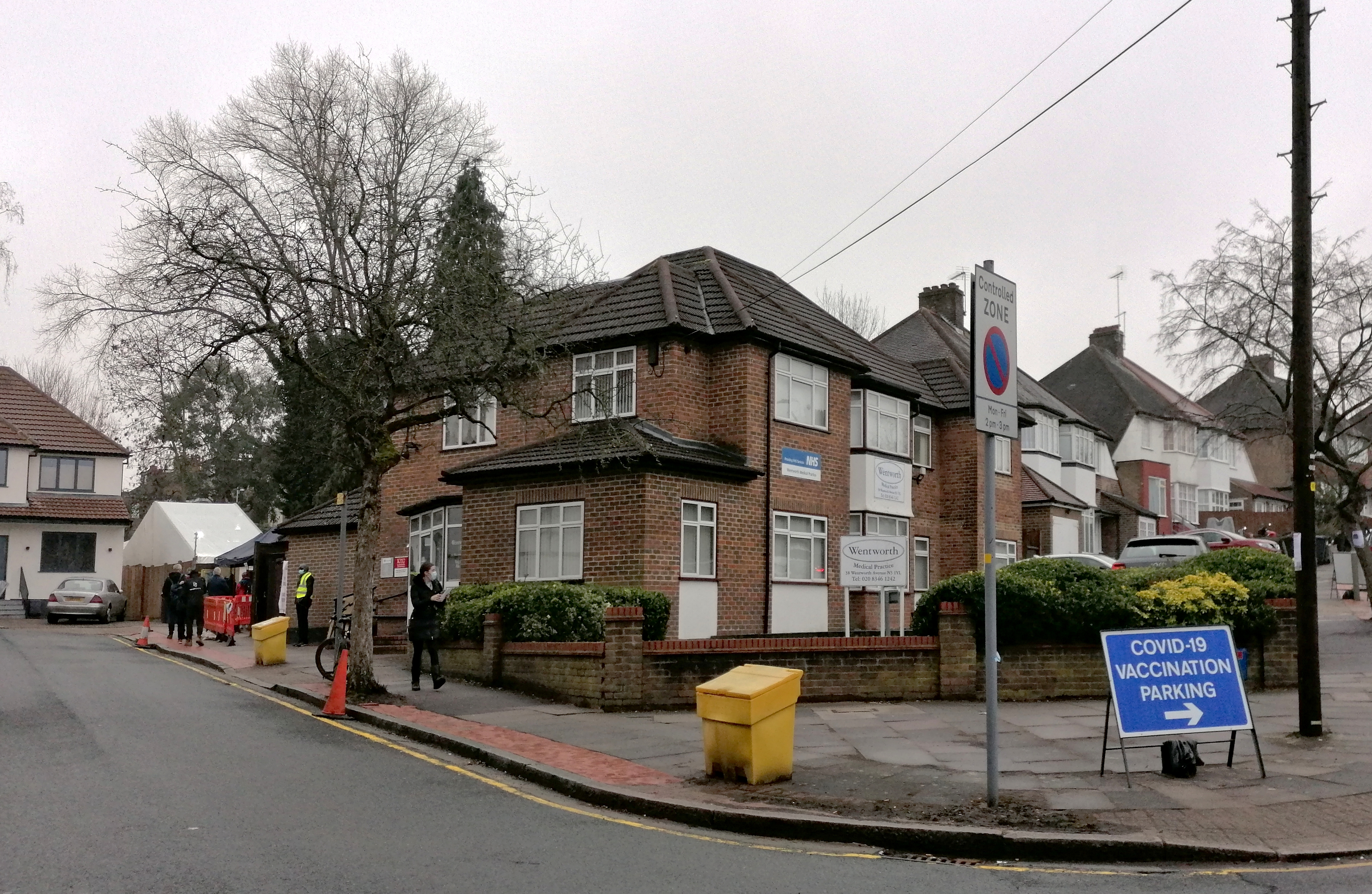
A vaccination centre in Finchley, north London, March 2021

On 8 December 2020, Margaret Keenan, 90, became the first person in the world (outside trials) to receive the Pfizer–BioNTech vaccine as the rollout of vaccinations began. William Shakespeare, 81, from Warwickshire became the second person, and the first man, to be vaccinated. Both vaccinations took place at University Hospital Coventry. On 4 January 2021, Brian Pinker, 82, became the first person (outside trials) to receive the Oxford–AstraZeneca vaccine. The vaccination took place at the Churchill Hospital, Oxford. England Health Secretary, Matt Hancock said this was a "pivotal moment" in the programme as this vaccine was easier to transport and store, requiring only ordinary fridge temperatures. Six hospitals in England began the Oxford vaccine rollout using the first batch of around 530,000 doses.

The Queen and Prince Philip, then 94 and 99 respectively, received their vaccinations within their Windsor Castle residence on 9 January 2021. Prince William cited their example, a week later, to encourage everyone to take up the vaccine after hearing that a degree of vaccine hesitancy had set in.

The rollout to the over 70s and clinically extremely vulnerable began on 18 January 2021, representing the fourth priority group and the final group needed to complete the government's initial 15 February target.

Over 20 million first doses were administered by 28 February 2021.

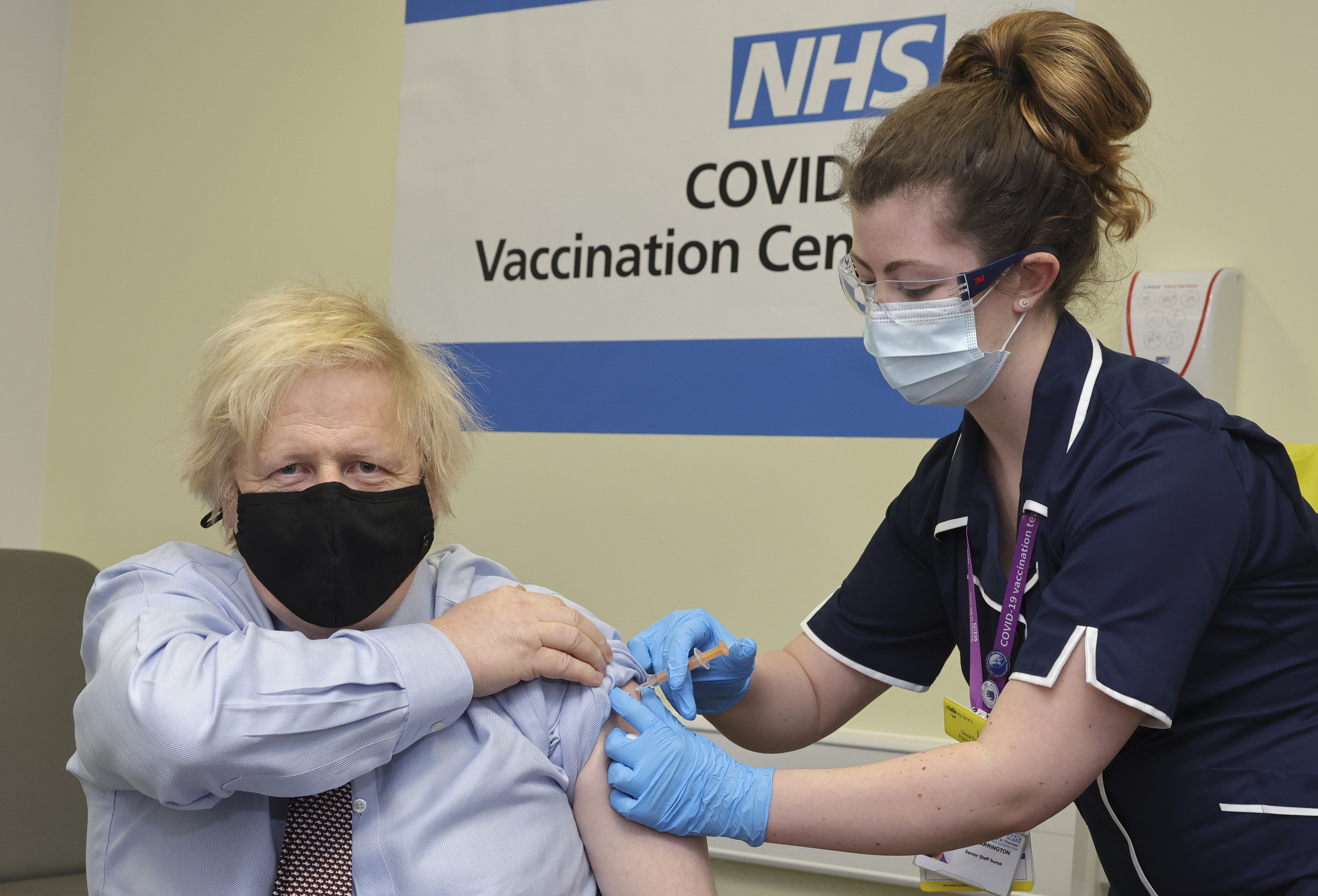
Prime Minister Boris Johnson is given the vaccine by nurse Lily Harrington at St Thomas' Hospital.

On 19 March, Prime Minister Boris Johnson received his first dose of the AstraZeneca vaccine at St. Thomas' Hospital. By this point, more than 26 million people had received their first dose of a COVID-19 Vaccine.

On 7 April 2021, Elle Taylor, 24, became the first person in the UK (outside trials) to receive the Moderna vaccine. The vaccine was administered on Miss Taylor, an unpaid carer from Ammanford, at Glangwili General Hospital, Carmarthen.

=== Guidance ===
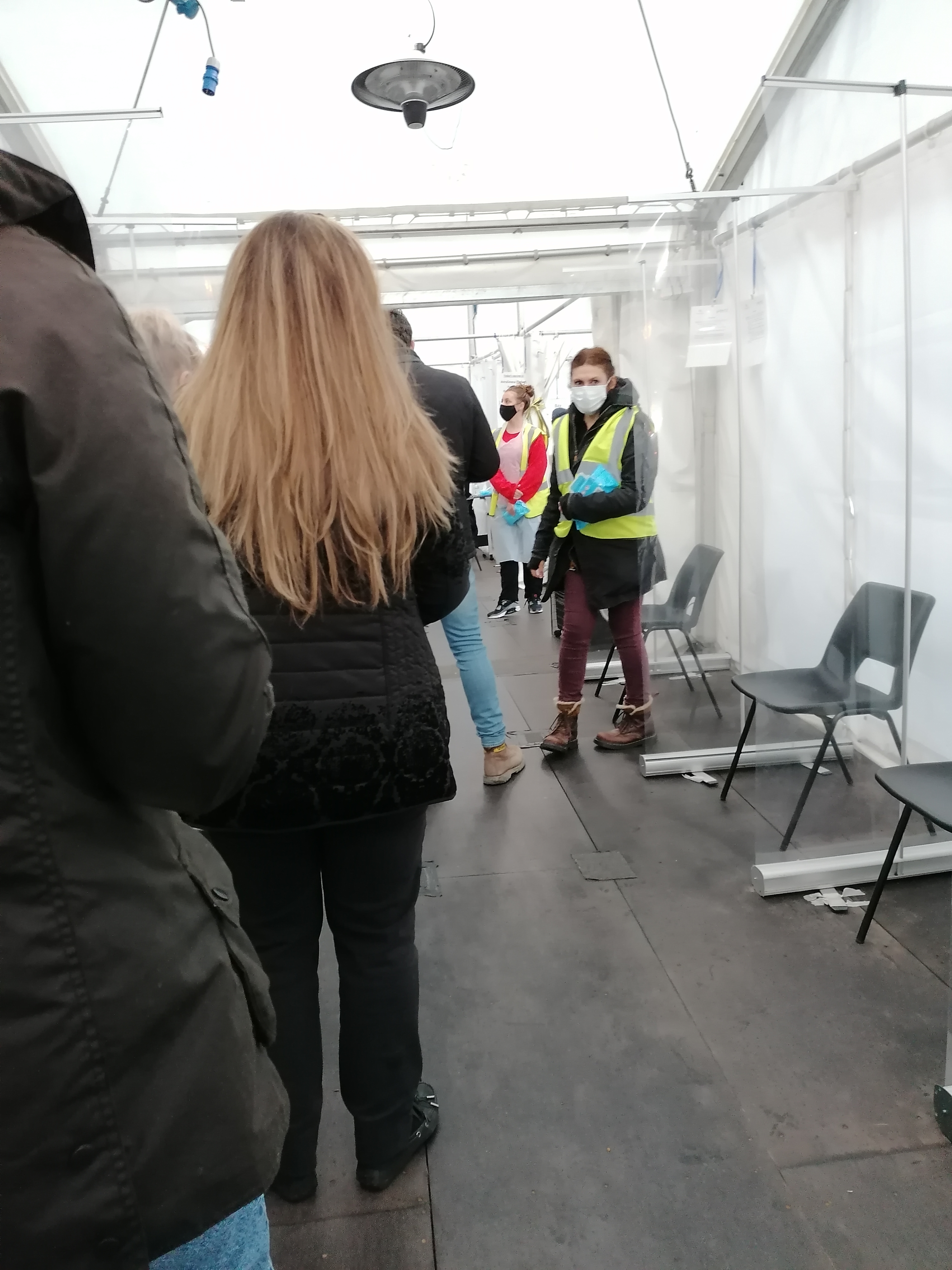
Queuing for the Oxford-AstraZeneca vaccine in Finchley, North London, March 2021

On 9 December 2020, the MHRA issued updated guidance, after two cases of anaphylaxis and another case of a possible allergic reaction following the vaccination. In the statement, June Raine, MHRA chief executive, said:

Any person with a history of anaphylaxis to a vaccine, medicine or food should not receive the Pfizer/BioNTech vaccine. A second dose should not be given to anyone who has experienced anaphylaxis following administration of the first dose of this vaccine.

Raine went on to say that such side effects have been known to happen with any vaccine but are "very rare". She continued to confirm that existing appointments should not be cancelled but people with a history of serious allergies should discuss this beforehand. Furthermore, she expressed confidence in the safety, assessment and monitoring of the vaccine. Guidance was given that vaccine recipients should be monitored for at least 15 minutes after vaccination and centres must be prepared for such events including the availability of an anaphylaxis pack. The two people affected were quickly treated and recovered well.

The Department of Health and Social Care confirmed that although the vaccine triggers the creation of antibodies, vaccination does not affect the result of an antibody test to detect whether someone has previously contracted the virus. This is because there are differences between the antibodies triggered and those being tested for.

As of 20 December 2020, Public Health England said there is "no evidence" to suggest that the recently identified Variant of Concern 202012/01 (a new variant of SARS-CoV-2) would be resistant to the Pfizer–BioNTech vaccine currently being used in the programme, and people should still be protected.

As of 8 April 2021, the JCVI issued advice to the government stating "that it is preferable for adults aged under 30 with no underlying conditions to be offered an alternative to the Oxford-AstraZeneca vaccine where available, following reports of extremely rare blood clots in a very small number of people."

As of 7 May 2021, the JCVI issued advice to the government stating "the JCVI has advised a preference for adults aged 30 to 39 without underlying health conditions to receive an alternative to the Oxford/AstraZeneca vaccine – where available and only if this does not cause substantial delays in being vaccinated, on extremely rare cases of concurrent thrombosis (blood clots) and thrombocytopenia (low platelet count) following the first dose of the Oxford/AstraZeneca vaccine."

As of 16 June 2021 it was expected that vaccination would become mandatory for those working in aged care (excluding those medically exempt).

== Companies and organisations involved ==
In the months before approval of the first vaccine, the Joint Committee on Vaccination and Immunisation (an independent group of experts) gave advice to the Vaccine Taskforce on the groups of people that should be prioritised for vaccination. The taskforce was formed in May 2020 to lead efforts to develop, manufacture and procure vaccines for the UK and globally, and was led until the end of 2020 by biotech venture capital manager Kate Bingham.

As with other licensed vaccines, the National Institute for Biological Standards and Control (part of the MHRA) reviews the production process and the manufacturer's quality control, and tests each batch of vaccine. Again in common with other vaccines and medicines, the MHRA monitors adverse reactions by collecting details submitted by healthcare workers, carers and the public through the Yellow Card Scheme; the agency set up a web reporting site specific to the COVID-19 vaccines.

The creation of the Vaccines Manufacturing and Innovation Centre was announced in December 2018, to provide the UK with a vaccine development and manufacturing facility, and its building is under construction at Harwell with planned completion brought forward from 2022 to 2021. The academic/industrial consortium assisted with development and early production of the Oxford–AstraZeneca vaccine during 2020. Services contractor Serco has a role in the deployment, as part of a contract which was extended for six months in June 2021 at a cost of £424 million.

The British Armed Forces have assisted with the vaccine rollout through the COVID Support Force in all parts of the UK. This has involved assistance with planning, the construction of vaccination centres and the contribution of staff to administer vaccines. This support is provided through the provisions of the military aid to the civil authorities (MACA) mechanism and is part of the military's wider contribution under Operation Rescript.

== Planning ==
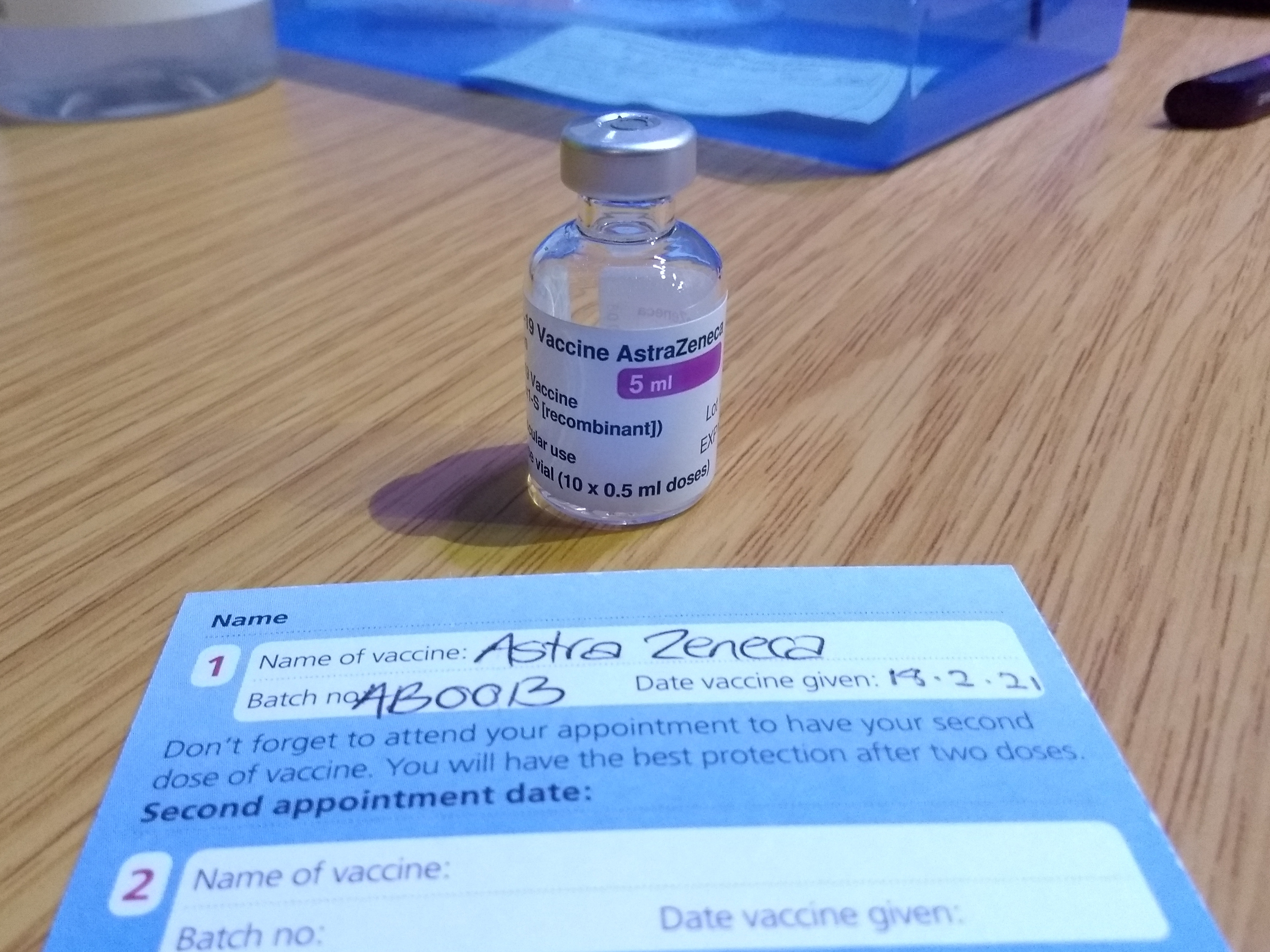
AstraZeneca vaccine vial and a NHS patient COVID-19 vaccination record card at a NHS vaccination centre

=== Delivery plan ===
During the rollout of the Pfizer–BioNTech vaccine first doses, the UK government announced on 30 December 2020 that future deployment would focus on that initial dose, rather than giving the required two doses as quickly as possible. The announcement of this plan coincided with the approval of the Oxford–AstraZeneca vaccine, and so represented the strategy to roll out the two vaccines. The government stated that prioritising the first dose was on advice from the Joint Committee on Vaccination and Immunisation (JCVI) and further assured that everyone would still receive their second dose within 12 weeks of their first. Despite this, Margaret Keenan, who was the first person outside of trials to receive a dose of the Pfizer–BioNTech vaccine, returned to hospital on 29 December 2020 for her follow-up injection. This was exactly three weeks after her first, in accordance with the original plan until the announcement of the new strategy. By receiving her second dose, Keenan completed the vaccination process.

The new plan to increase the gap between first and second doses from 3 to 12 weeks was criticised as "unfair" by the British Medical Association (BMA) on 31 December 2020, as appointments booked for 4 January 2021 or later would have to be rescheduled. In response, all four Chief Medical Officers (CMO), plus England's Deputy CMO Jonathan Van-Tam, signed an open letter explaining the policy shift. They said by prioritising first doses, more people would have substantial protection faster, and the second dose adds relatively minor additional protection in the short term. They went on to say that for every 1,000 people given the second 'booster' dose, 1,000 new people would not be able to have up to 70% protection and would instead remain totally unprotected.

=== Delivery targets ===
During his address announcing England's third national lockdown on 4 January 2021, Boris Johnson indicated a preliminary target for the vaccination programme, saying:

By the middle of February, if things go well and with a fair wind in our sails, we expect to have offered the first vaccine dose to everyone in the four top priority groups identified by the Joint Committee on Vaccination and Immunisation.

He went on to confirm this would include all elderly residents of care homes and indeed everyone over the age of 70, as well as all frontline health and social care workers, and all those who are "clinically extremely vulnerable".

Vaughan Gething, Minister for Health and Social Services in the Welsh Government, matched England's targets by announcing that all people in groups 1–4 would be offered a first dose by mid February.

A vaccination plan was published by the Scottish Government on 14 January. Part of this plan, subsequently withdrawn after objections from central government, projected the numbers of doses of vaccines delivered weekly to Scotland from the British Government until May, estimating that by mid-March there would be enough doses there to supply every person in the priority groups with their first doses, and enough doses by July to supply every adult with both doses. Extrapolating from these figures, Sky News estimated that supply for the UK overall would be sufficient to meet the British Government's aim of immunising all 15 million priority individuals in the country by mid-February, and vaccinating all adults in Britain with their first dose by mid-July.

=== Vaccine priority groups ===
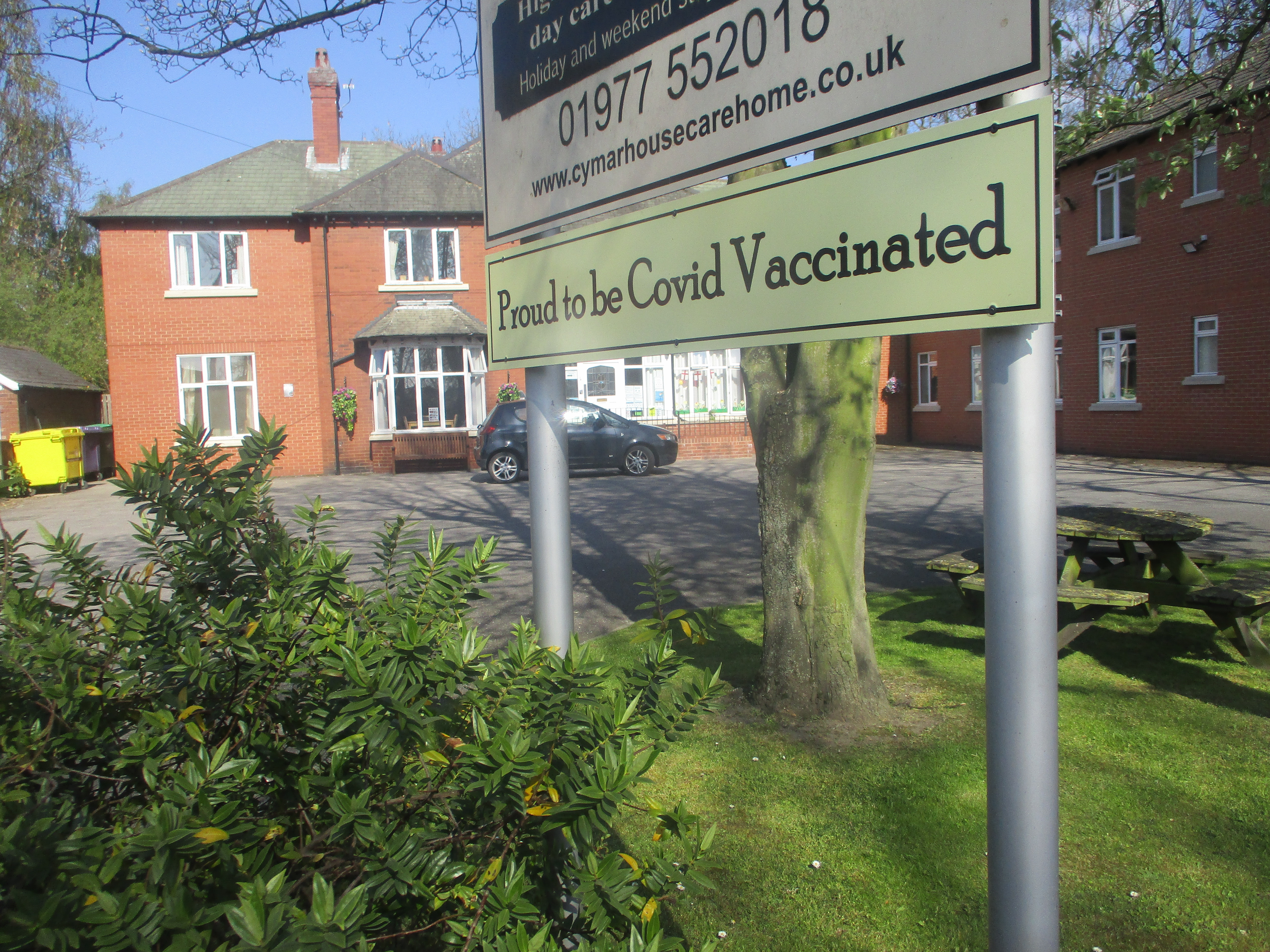
A care home in Castleford, West Yorkshire with sign reading "Proud to be Covid(sic) Vaccinated"

==== Phase 1 ====
The JCVI advised the governments on how to prioritise the rollout. The top priority for the programme was to prevent deaths and to ensure that the National Health Service (NHS) would not be overwhelmed, and as older people are more at risk of hospitalisation or death from COVID-19, prioritisation was primarily based on age.

The table shows the priority groups for the first phase of the roll-out. An estimate of the number of people in each group in the United Kingdom is also shown (but note that some people fall into more than one group).

| Order | Priority group | Number eligible (estimated) |
|---|---|---|
| 1 | residents in a care home for older adults and their carers | 0.8M |
| 2 | all those aged 80 years and over, and frontline health and social care workers | 7.1M |
| 3 | all those aged 75 years and over | 2.3M |
| 4 | all those aged 70 years and over, and clinically extremely vulnerable individuals | 4.4M |
| 5 | all those aged 65 years and over | 2.9M |
| 6 | all those aged 16 years to 64 years with underlying health conditions which put them at higher risk of serious disease and mortality | 7.3M |
| 7 | all those aged 60 years and over | 1.8M |
| 8 | all those aged 55 years and over | 2.4M |
| 9 | all those aged 50 years and over | 2.8M |

Breakdown of sizes of high-priority groups for COVID-19 vaccination in the UK

"Clinically extremely vulnerable" is defined as:

- solid organ transplant recipients
- people with specific cancers:
  - people with cancer who are undergoing active chemotherapy
  - people with lung cancer who are undergoing radical radiotherapy
  - people with cancers of the blood or bone marrow such as leukaemia, lymphoma or myeloma who are at any stage of treatment
  - people having immunotherapy or other continuing antibody treatments for cancer
  - people having other targeted cancer treatments that can affect the immune system, such as protein kinase inhibitors or PARP inhibitors
  - people who have had bone marrow or stem cell transplants in the last 6 months or who are still taking immunosuppression drugs
- people with severe respiratory conditions including all cystic fibrosis, severe asthma and severe chronic obstructive pulmonary disease (COPD)
- people with rare diseases that significantly increase the risk of infections (such as severe combined immunodeficiency (SCID), homozygous sickle cell disease)
- people on immunosuppression therapies sufficient to significantly increase risk of infection
- people with spleen problems, e.g. splenectomy (spleen removal)
- adults with Down's syndrome
- adults on dialysis or with chronic kidney disease (stage 5)
- other people who have also been classed as clinically extremely vulnerable, based on clinical judgement and an assessment of their needs.

Women who are pregnant and children under 16 are not defined as clinically extremely vulnerable for the purpose of the vaccination programme.

Polish group Omni Calculator developed a tool which estimates when individuals will receive the vaccine, based on age, employment, and health status.

"People with underlying health conditions which put them at higher risk of serious disease and mortality" is defined as:

- people with long-term lung conditions (such as severe asthma, COPD, bronchiectasis and cystic fibrosis)
- people with long-term conditions affecting the heart or blood vessels (such as congenital heart disease, heart failure and peripheral arterial disease):
- people with diabetes
- people with chronic kidney disease
- people with long-term liver conditions (such as cirrhosis and hepatitis)
- people with conditions affecting the brain or nerves (such as dementia, Parkinson's disease, motor neurone disease, multiple sclerosis, epilepsy, cerebral palsy or stroke)
- people with learning disabilities
- people with a condition or treatment that makes you more likely to get infections (such as HIV or some treatments for lupus, psoriasis or rheumatoid arthritis)
- people with severe mental health conditions (such as schizophrenia and bipolar disorder)
- people with rare diseases that significantly increase the risk of infections (such as severe combined immunodeficiency (SCID), homozygous sickle cell disease)
- people on immunosuppression therapies sufficient to significantly increase risk of infection
- People with severe obesity (a BMI of 40 or above)

==== Phase 2 ====
The JCVI released an interim statement on 26 February 2021 regarding the rollout of the vaccine in Phase 2. It was decided that Phase 2 would not rollout by occupation or ethnicity but instead solely on age. The order therefore in Phase 2 is as follows:

| Order | Priority group | Number eligible (estimated) |
|---|---|---|
| 10 | all those aged 40 to 49 years | ~21 million |
| 11 | all those aged 30 to 39 years | ~21 million |
| 12 | all those aged 18 to 29 years | ~21 million |

The JCVI also noted that males from BAME backgrounds and those with a BMI over 30 were at an increased risk, and therefore stated that it "strongly advises that individuals in these groups promptly take up the offer of vaccination when they are offered", with local officials advised to "promote vaccination in these groups". Poorer neighbourhoods should also be subject to an outreach programme by local officials. The UK government said it aimed to offer all adults over the age of 18 a vaccine before 31 July 2021.

The decision not to prioritise people in high-risk public-facing occupations such as teachers, police officers and bus drivers was criticised by the Association of School and College Leaders, NASUWT and the Metropolitan Police Federation. Asthma UK also criticised the lack of prioritisation of those with mild or moderate asthma in either Phase 1 or Phase 2. JCVI chair Wei Shen Lim defended the rollout plan, stating "speed of deployment is the most important factor" and that rollout by occupation would slow down vaccinations.

==== Juveniles ====
Healthy individuals under the age of 18, and all under 16s, were not part of the initial vaccine rollout, on the grounds of their relatively low risk from the virus and the then limited availability of evidence relating to COVID-19 vaccines' effects on young people. On 19 July 2021, the vaccine rollout was expanded to vulnerable adolescents from the age of 12 and young people in the three months prior to their 18th birthday. They were joined by all 16- and 17-year-olds on 4 August. The Vaccinations Committee did not endorse vaccines for healthy 12- to 15-year-olds, on the grounds of only 'marginal gain' to the health of individual children. However, the UK's chief medical officers agreed to the rollout of a single dose of the Pfizer vaccine to this age group on 13 September in order to reduce disruption to education. Second doses, three months or more after their first, were expanded to this age range on 29 November.

On 15 and 16 February 2022, plans were announced across the UK to expand the Pfizer vaccine rollout to children from the age of five; the Vaccinations Committee approved this, taking into account an estimate that over 85% of all children aged 5 to 11 had experienced COVID-19 infection by the end of the previous month. That plan was later reversed, with no children under 12 being eligible after 1 September 2022 except for those in high-risk groups.

==== Booster doses ====
In September 2021, booster doses began to be given to members of the following groups, six months after their second vaccine dose:

- people over the age of 50
- vulnerable people over 16
- health and social care workers
- adult members of the households of immune-suppressed individuals

It was decided in November that healthy people in their forties would also be eligible for a booster vaccination. Later that month, booster vaccinations were expanded to everyone over the age of 18 who had received their second dose more than three months earlier, whilst some people with severe immunosuppression became eligible for a fourth dose in response to the SARS-CoV-2 Omicron variant. In December, the booster programme was further expanded to offer all adults a booster dose by the end of 2021.

Further booster doses were offered from February 2022 for people who had received their previous dose around six months earlier and were:

- aged 75 years or older,
- resident in a care home for older adults,
- aged 12 years or over and immunosuppressed.

From Autumn 2022, further booster doses were offered to:

- residents and staff in care homes for older adults,
- front line health and social care workers,
- people aged 50 years or older,
- people aged 5 years or older who are in a clinical risk group or who have immunosuppressed household contacts,
- people aged 16 years or older who are carers.

== Progress to date ==
By the end of the first full week of the programme, up to 15 December 2020, 137,897 people had been vaccinated with the first dose in the two-dose regimen: 108,000 in England, 7,897 in Wales, 4,000 in Northern Ireland and 18,000 in Scotland.

By 5 January 2021, 1.3 million people across the UK had received their first dose of either the Pfizer or Oxford–AstraZeneca COVID-19 vaccine, which included more than 650,000 people over 80, representing around 23% of that age band in England.

As of 13 October 2021, a cumulative total of 49,252,939 people had received the first dose: 41,263,377 in England; 1,316,225 in Northern Ireland; 4,270,126 in Scotland and 2,403,211 in Wales. In addition, a cumulative total of 45,239,759 people had received the second dose: 37,918,254 in England; 1,221,045 in Northern Ireland; 3,868,656 in Scotland and 2,231,804 in Wales.

As at 3 August 2022, a cumulative total of 53,710,109 people (80.07% of the entire UK population) had received the first dose, a cumulative total of 50,483,527 people (75.26%) had received the second dose, a cumulative total of 40,196,024 people (59.92%) had received the booster or third dose, and a cumulative total of 6,200,537 people (9.29%) had received a fourth dose; the total number of vaccinations given (first, second, third and fourth doses) were 150,590,197.

Government vaccination updates increased from weekly to daily, from 11 January 2021.

Weekly new and cumulative doses, by dose type, as at each week-ending date
| Previous WEEKLY figures | | England | | Northern Ireland | | Scotland | | Wales | | UK TOTAL | |
| Date | Dose | New | Cumulative | New | Cumulative | New | Cumulative | New | Cumulative | New | Cumulative |
|---|---|---|---|---|---|---|---|---|---|---|---|
| 13 December 2020 | 1st | 55,389 (Note: England vaccination uptake data not published until 15 December 2020, so carried forward to next week ending) | 55,389 | 3,623 | 3,623 | 18,996 | 18,996 | 8,207 | 8,207 | 86,215 | 86,215 |
| 20 December 2020 | 1st | 518,469 | 573,858 | 12,445 | 16,068 | 41,110 | 60,106 | 15,559 | 23,766 | 587,583 | 673,798 |
| 27 December 2020 | 1st | 267,347 | 841,205 | 14,948 | 31,016 | 34,404 | 94,510 | 12,433 | 36,199 | 392,132 | 1,002,930 |
| 3 January 2021 | 1st | 328,980 | 1,170,185 | 9,669 | 40,685 | 21,321 | 115,831 | 14,094 | 50,293 | 374,064 | 1,376,994 |
| 3 January 2021 | 2nd | 20,565 | 20,565 | 1,271 | 1,271 | 43 | 43 | 26 | 26 | 21,905 | 21,905 |
| 3 January 2021 | Total | 349,545 | 1,190,750 | 10,940 | 41,956 | 21,364 | 115,874 | 14,120 | 50,319 | 395,969 | 1,398,899 |
| 10 January 2021 | 1st | 951,951 | 2,122,136 | 38,395 | 79,080 | 51,109 | 166,940 | 41,212 | 91,505 | 1,082,667 | 2,459,661 |
| 10 January 2021 | 2nd | 384,998 | 405,563 | 12,287 | 13,558 | 2,794 | 2,837 | 59 | 85 | 400,138 | 422,043 |
| 10 January 2021 | Total | 1,336,949 | 2,527,699 | 50,682 | 92,638 | 53,903 | 169,777 | 41,271 | 91,590 | 1,482,805 | 2,881,704 |
| 17 January 2021 | 1st | 1,606,125 | 3,728,261 | 46,637 | 125,717 | 104,469 | 271,409 | 67,237 | 158,742 | 1,824,468 | 4,284,129 |
| 17 January 2021 | 2nd | 40,372 | 445935 | 8,768 | 22,326 | 1,102 | 3,939 | 113 | 198 | 50,355 | 472,398 |
| 17 January 2021 | Total | 1,646,497 | 4,174,196 | 55,405 | 148,043 | 105,571 | 275,348 | 67,350 | 158,940 | 1,874,823 | 4,756,527 |
| 24 January 2021 | 1st | 2,238,615 | 5,966,876 | 33,925 | 159,642 | 153,238 | 424,647 | 124,251 | 282,993 | 2,550,029 | 6,834,158 |
| 24 January 2021 | 2nd | 6,480 | 452,415 | 387 | 22,713 | 2,049 | 5,988 | 370 | 568 | 9,286 | 481,684 |
| 24 January 2021 | Total | 2,245,095 | 6,419,291 | 34,312 | 182,355 | 155,287 | 430,635 | 124,621 | 283,561 | 2,559,315 | 7,315,842 |
| 31 January 2021 | 1st | 2,189,803 | 8,156,679 | 62,167 | 221,809 | 164,922 | 589,569 | 160,504 | 443,497 | 2,577,396 | 9,411,554 |
| 31 January 2021 | 2nd | 8,349 | 460,764 | 1,899 | 24,612 | 2,492 | 8,480 | 381 | 949 | 13,121 | 494,805 |
| 31 January 2021 | Total | 2,198,152 | 8,617,443 | 64,066 | 246,421 | 167,414 | 598,049 | 160,885 | 444,446 | 2,590,517 | 9,906,359 |
| 7 February 2021 | 1st | 2,367,095 | 10,523,774 | 81,669 | 303,478 | 277,254 | 866,823 | 167,361 | 610,858 | 2,893,379 | 12,304,933 |
| 7 February 2021 | 2nd | 8,395 | 469,159 | 2,851 | 27,463 | 3,038 | 11,518 | 1,872 | 2,821 | 16,156 | 510,961 |
| 7 February 2021 | Total | 2,375,490 | 10,992,933 | 84,520 | 330,941 | 280,292 | 878,431 | 169,233 | 613,679 | 2,909,535 | 12,815,894 |
| 14 February 2021 | 1st | 2,343,180 | 12,862,909 | 93,765 | 397,243 | 388,367 | 1,255,190 | 180,833 | 784,809 | 3,006,145 | 15,300,151 |
| 14 February 2021 | 2nd | 19,086 | 490,722 | 1,542 | 29,005 | 3,811 | 14,501 | 2,610 | 5,402 | 27,049 | 539,630 |
| 14 February 2021 | Total | 2,362,266 | 13,353,631 | 95,307 | 426,248 | 392,178 | 1,269,691 | 183,443 | 790,211 | 3,033,194 | 15,839,781 |
| 21 February 2021 | 1st | 2,095,165 | 14,958,074 | 60,787 | 458,030 | 190,298 | 1,445,488 | 77,439 | 862,248 | 2,423,689 | 17,723,840 |
| 21 February 2021 | 2nd | 22,713 | 513,435 | 1,791 | 30,796 | 22,841 | 37,342 | 37,350 | 42,752 | 84,695 | 624,325 |
| 21 February 2021 | Total | 2,117,878 | 15,471,509 | 62,578 | 488,826 | 213,139 | 1,482,830 | 114,789 | 905,000 | 2,508,384 | 18,348,165 |
| 28 February 2021 | 1st | 2,254,730 | 17,212,804 | 67,370 | 525,400 | 166,090 | 1,611,578 | 63,421 | 925,669 | 2,551,611 | 20,275,451 |
| 28 February 2021 | 2nd | 86,500 | 599,935 | 2,401 | 33,197 | 41,523 | 78,865 | 61,067 | 103,819 | 191,491 | 815,816 |
| 28 February 2021 | Total | 2,341,230 | 17,812,739 | 69,771 | 558,597 | 207,613 | 1,690,443 | 124,488 | 1,029,488 | 2,743,102 | 21,091,267 |
| 7 March 2021 | 1st | 1,802,693 | 19,015,497 | 63,403 | 588,803 | 163,081 | 1,774,659 | 72,627 | 998,296 | 2,101,804 | 22,377,255 |
| 7 March 2021 | 2nd | 197,386 | 797,321 | 9,654 | 42,851 | 39,867 | 118,732 | 79,920 | 183,739 | 326,827 | 1,142,643 |
| 7 March 2021 | Total | 2,000,079 | 19,812,818 | 73,057 | 631,654 | 202,948 | 1,893,391 | 152,547 | 1,182,035 | 2,428,631 | 23,519,898 |
| 14 March 2021 | 1st | 1,776,341 | 20,791,838 | 40,658 | 629,461 | 134,332 | 1,908,991 | 124,635 | 1,122,931 | 2,075,966 | 24,453,221 |
| 14 March 2021 | 2nd | 332,123 | 1,129,444 | 11,785 | 54,636 | 43,213 | 161,945 | 80,516 | 264,255 | 467,637 | 1,610,280 |
| 14 March 2021 | Total | 2,108,464 | 21,921,282 | 52,443 | 684,097 | 177,545 | 2,070,936 | 205,151 | 1,387,186 | 2,543,603 | 26,063,501 |
| 21 March 2021 | 1st | 3,063,024 | 23,854,862 | 58,067 | 687,528 | 273,409 | 2,182,400 | 150,255 | 1,273,186 | 3,544,755 | 27,997,976 |
| 21 March 2021 | 2nd | 492,103 | 1,621,547 | 34,047 | 88,683 | 63,151 | 225,096 | 81,803 | 346,058 | 671,104 | 2,281,384 |
| 21 March 2021 | Total | 3,555,127 | 25,476,409 | 92,114 | 776,211 | 336,560 | 2,407,496 | 232,058 | 1,619,244 | 4,215,859 | 30,279,360 |

== Vaccination centres ==
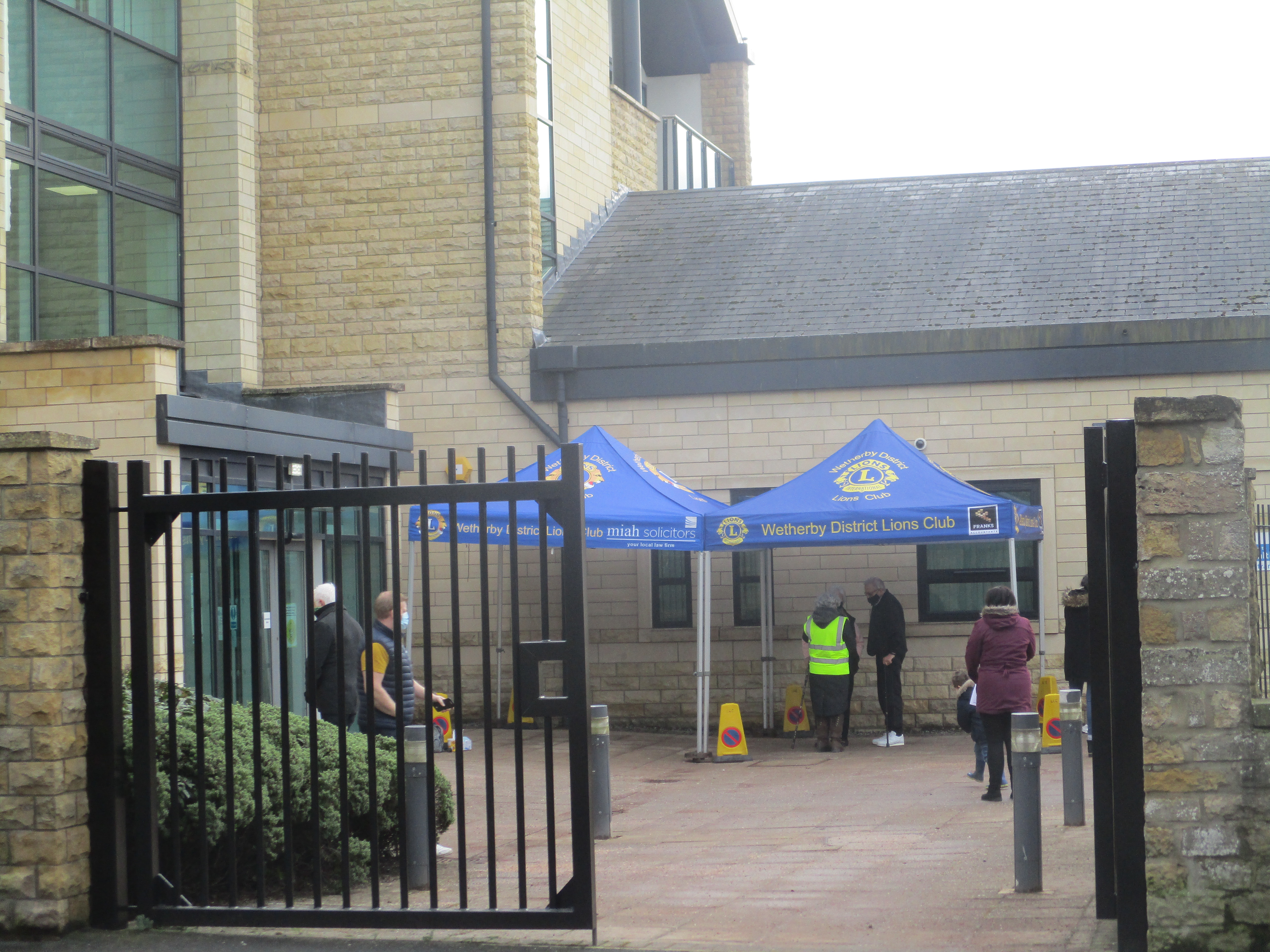
Marshalling for COVID-19 vaccines at a medical centre in Wetherby, West Yorkshire

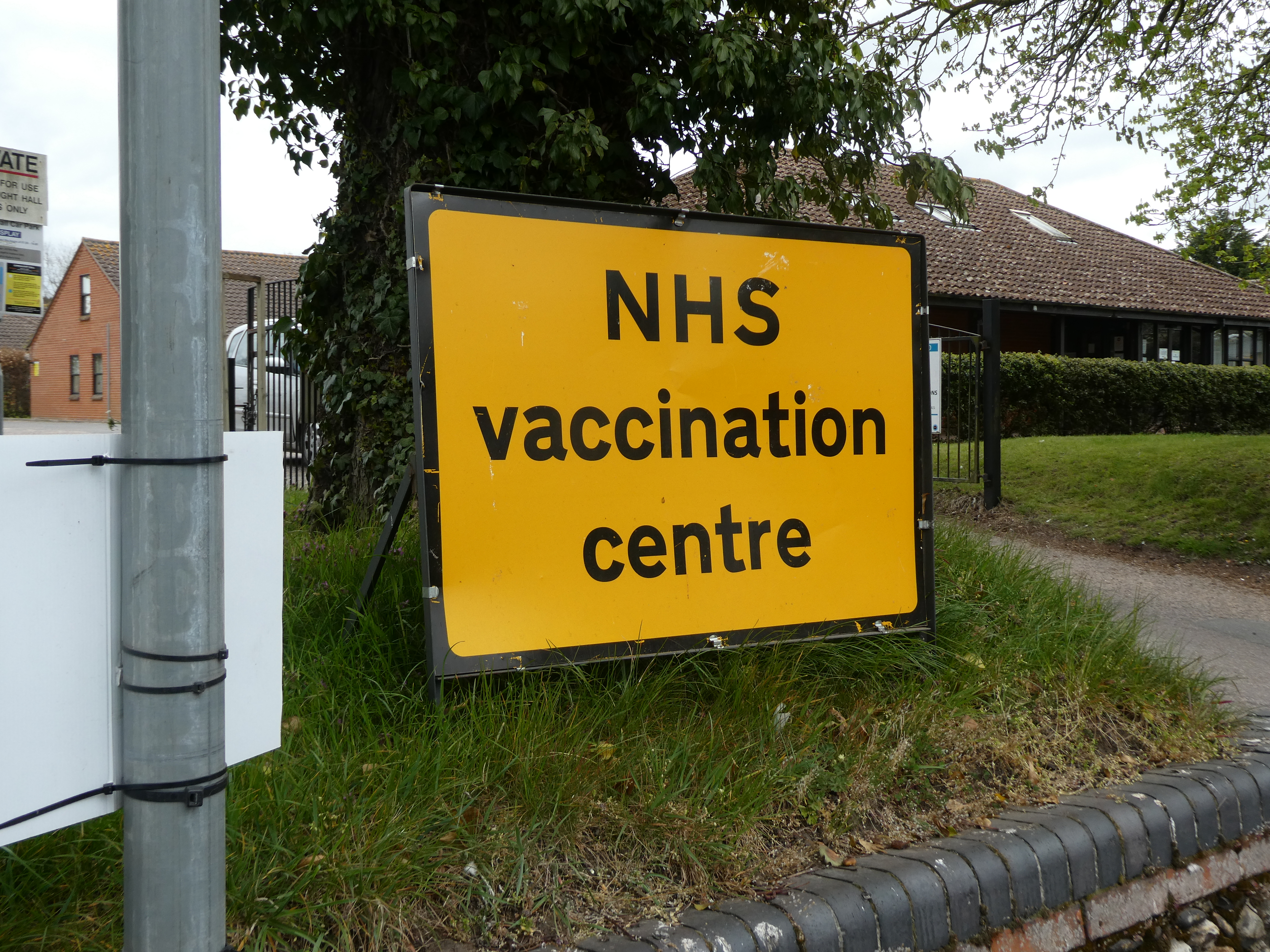
A sign for a vaccination centre

More than 70 sites across the UK were in operation at the end of the programme's first full week (15 December 2020). Whilst hospitals formed the centres initially, GP-led centres also started later in that week.

Care home locations in England entered the programme on Wednesday 16 December. "Hundreds" of residents received the first dose in seven care homes in Slough, Aintree, Herne Bay, Thanet, Chalfont St Peter, Droitwich and Cheltenham. Larger care homes (50 to 70 beds) were to be prioritised.

The Chelsea Pensioners received their first dose at the Royal Hospital Chelsea on 23 December.

Large venues such as sports stadia and exhibition centres started to be used as mass vaccination centres from 11 January 2021, with seven such centres opening in England at Millennium Point, Birmingham; Ashton Gate Stadium, Bristol; ExCeL London; Manchester Tennis and Football Centre; Centre for Life, Newcastle; Robertson House, Stevenage; and Epsom Downs Racecourse, Surrey. Seven mass vaccination centres were initially opened in Wales with that number increasing to 34 by February alongside 17 acute and community hospital sites.

Over 400 GP-led centres were rolling out the vaccination in Wales by the start of February.

High street pharmacies in England started to administer the vaccine from 14 January 2021, with 6 chosen for the roll out initially.

Places of worship also started to be used as large vaccination centres, with Salisbury Cathedral and Lichfield Cathedral among the first to make provisions from 15 January 2021; with the Al-Abbas Islamic Centre in Balsall Heath, Birmingham becoming the first mosque to offer the service on 21 January 2021.

=== Popup events and mobile centres ===
Numerous pop-up vaccination events took place during the programme. Venues included mosques, churches, community centres, and food banks. Tottenham Hotspur stadium hosted three vaccine events delivered by Morris House Group Practice during 2021 delivering over 10,000 vaccines and pushing Haringey to the top of the vaccine delivery at that time. Many areas operated vaccine buses to increase convenience and enable patients not able to travel to be vaccinated.

=== Locations ===
As of 28 May 2021, there were a total of 1,992 vaccination sites operating in England, (Note: As of the stated date, location data for Scotland, Wales and Northern Ireland has not been published by the respective devolved authorities.) These were made up as follows:

Number of vaccination sites in England, by region and type, as of 28 May 2021
| Region | Hospital hubs | GP-Led vaccination services | Mass vaccination centres | Pharmacies | Totals |
|---|---|---|---|---|---|
| East of England | 31 | 134 | 50 | 40 | 255 |
| London | 51 | 103 | 35 | 109 | 298 |
| Midlands | 40 | 189 | 20 | 96 | 345 |
| North East and Yorkshire | 46 | 173 | 17 | 96 | 332 |
| North West | 49 | 137 | 11 | 63 | 260 |
| South East | 39 | 180 | 18 | 66 | 303 |
| South West | 21 | 111 | 13 | 54 | 199 |
| Grand Total | 277 | 1,027 | 164 | 524 | 1992 |

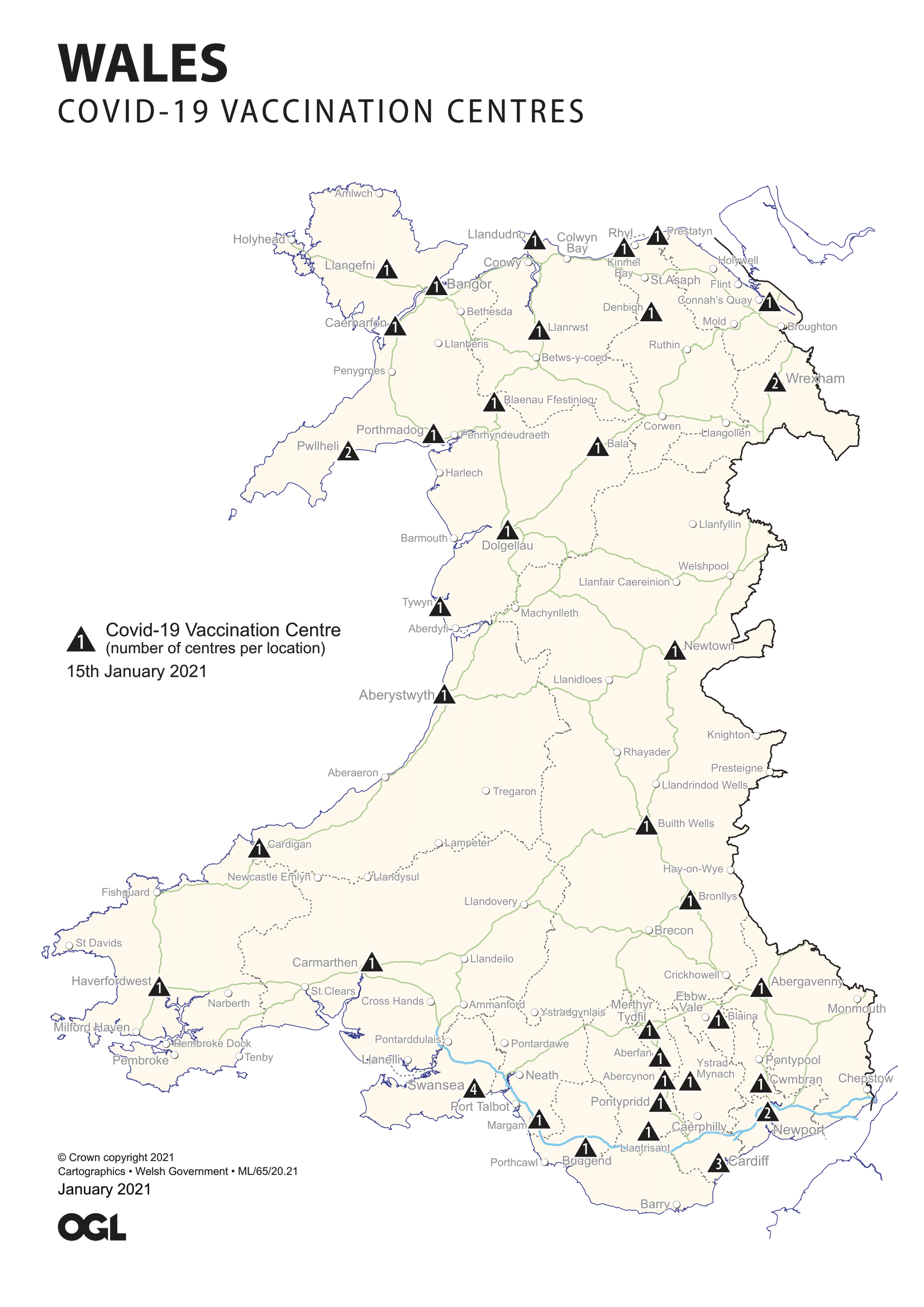
Vaccination site locations in Wales, as at 15 January 2021

Vaccination site locations in England, as at 5 February 2021

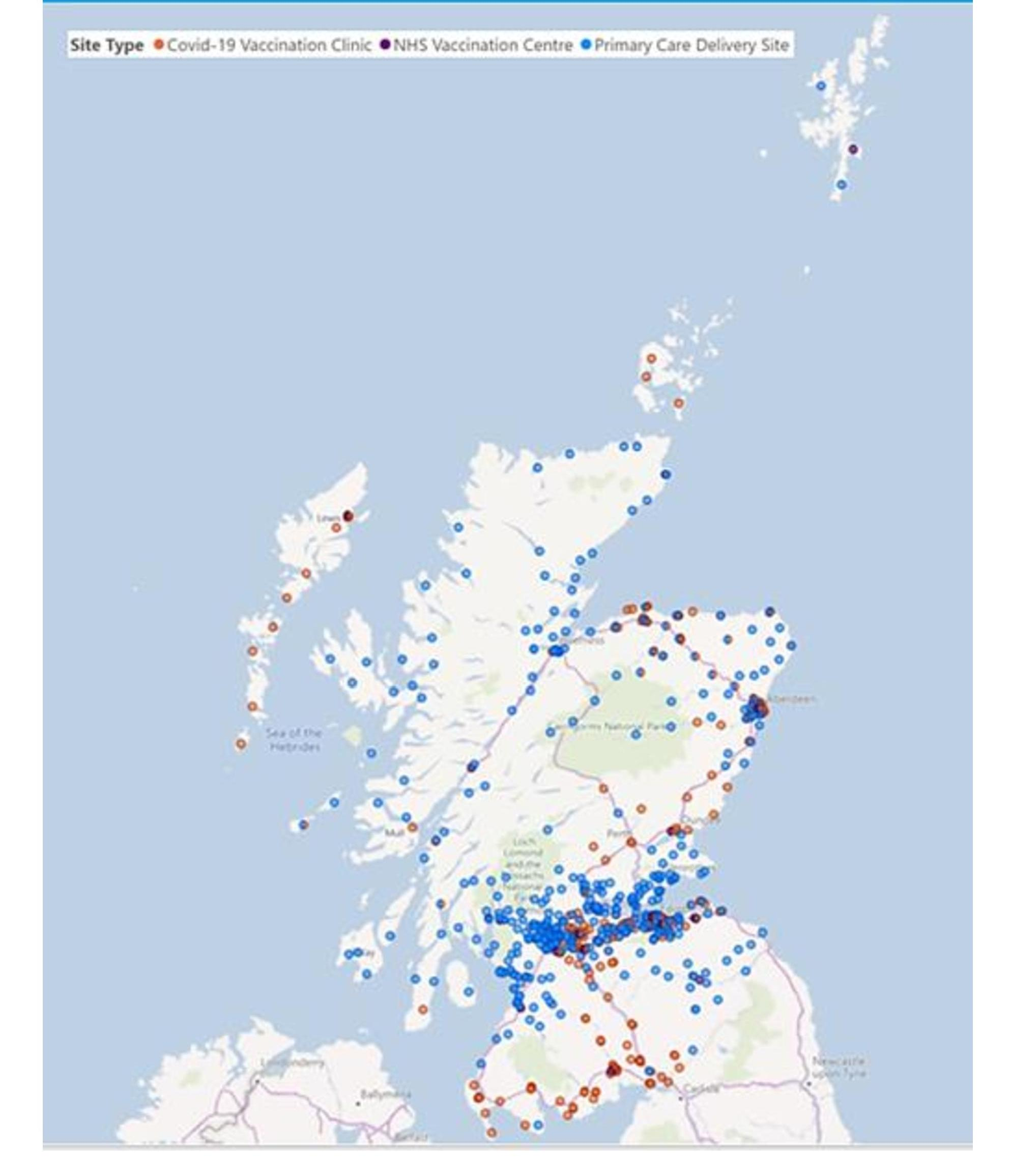
Vaccination site locations in Scotland, as at 14 January 2021

== Public opinion ==
=== Vaccine hesitancy ===
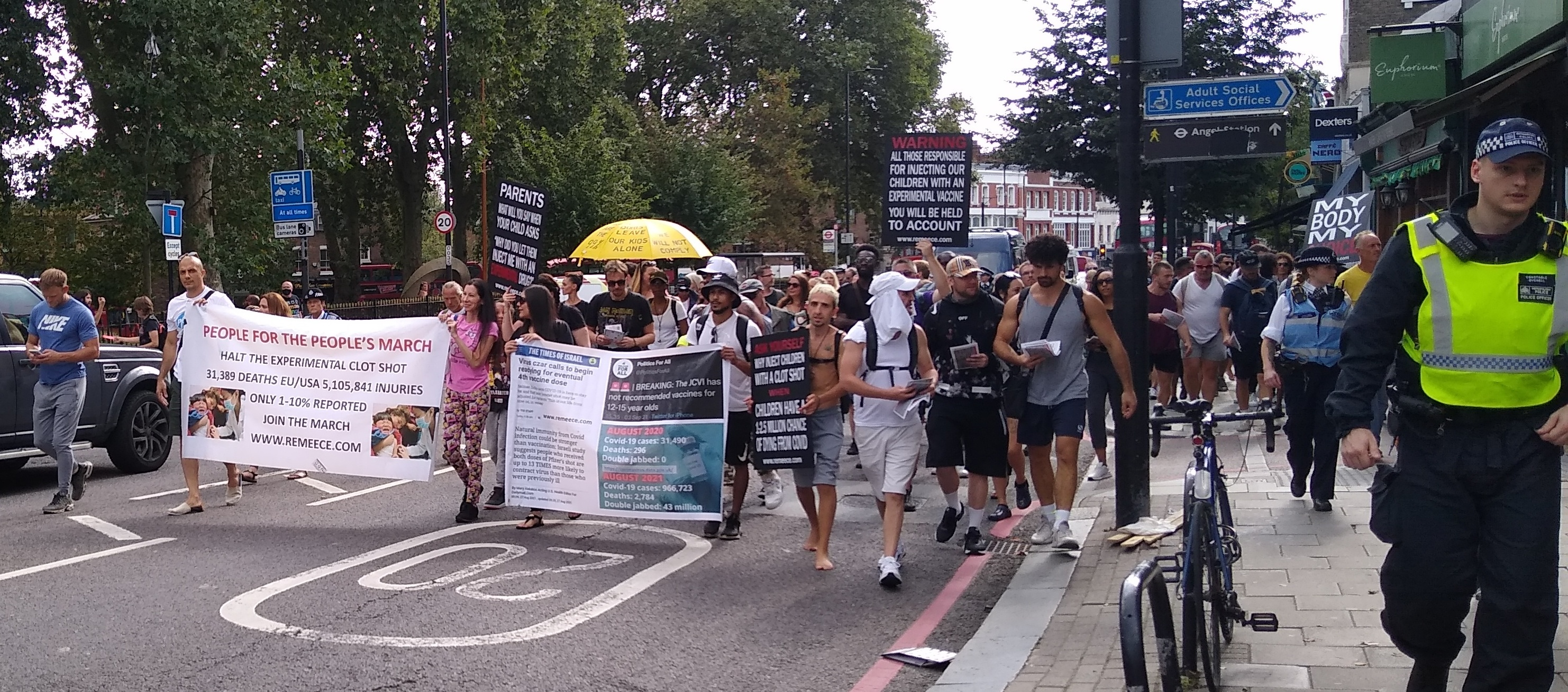
A protest against COVID-19 vaccination in London during September 2021

Polling suggested that levels of vaccine hesitancy were fairly low in the UK compared to other parts of the world. YouGov's first survey on the subject in the middle of November 2020 suggested that 15% of British adults would refuse to get a COVID-19 vaccine which had fallen to just 6% (the lowest of any country polled) by April 2021. Research by Ipsos MORI in May suggested that 99% of people who had received their first dose intended to take their second and 95% were certain they would. Whilst, indicating that 94% of the wider public had either had their first dose or intended to do when offered. Research by the Office for National Statistics suggested that 96% of people over 16 had a positive attitude to the COVID-19 vaccine in early summer 2021.

Though a large majority of people in all social groups were willing to take the vaccine, polling suggested that some demographics were more likely to display reluctance than others. Younger individuals were more likely to be uncertain than their elders, and members of ethnic minority groups were more likely to be reluctant than white responders. The November 2020 YouGov poll suggested that "leave" voters in the 2016 EU referendum were less likely to want the vaccine than "Remain" voters though this gap had closed by the spring. Areas which showed higher levels of hesitancy towards the start of vaccine process included Inner East London, Outer West London, North East England, West Wales and the Valleys though reluctance fell significantly in these areas as the months went by. Though the previously cited survey sampled public opinion in Great Britain (England, Scotland and Wales) one poll conducted in September 2021 suggested that the level of vaccine hesitancy in Northern Ireland was fairly high in comparison.

=== Impact on political attitudes ===
It was suggested by commentators that the vaccine rollout strengthened support for the government with the Conservative Party enjoying an uptick in support in polls of voting intentions around spring 2021. The so called "vaccine bounce" was widely cited by observers as one of the reasons for the party's gains at local elections in May 2021. Polling at around this time suggested that 85% of British voters felt their government had handled the vaccine rollout well in comparison to less than a fifth of their French and German counterparts. Analysts also suggested that this phenomenon may have contributed to a waning in support for Scottish independence in the run up to the 2021 Scottish parliament election. The 'Mood of the Nation 2021' report by the consultancy firm BritainThinks based on research conducted in October and November 2021 found that whilst the optimistic mood around COVID-19 of the summer had rebaited the successful vaccine rollout remained one of few present day subjects which the general public in the UK cited as providing a sense of national pride.

== See also ==
- History of the COVID-19 pandemic in the United Kingdom
- Timeline of the COVID-19 pandemic in the United Kingdom (July–December 2020)
- Timeline of the COVID-19 pandemic in the United Kingdom (January–June 2021)
- Timeline of the COVID-19 pandemic in the United Kingdom (July–December 2021)
- British government response to the COVID-19 pandemic
- Deployment of COVID-19 vaccines
- European Commission–AstraZeneca COVID-19 vaccine dispute
