= The Green Book (immunisation guide) =

Book about vaccination

Immunisation against infectious disease
- 2021 edition
- Language: English
- Subject: Vaccines
- Genre: Medicine
- Publication date: Paper: 1992, 1996, 2006
- Publication place: United Kingdom
- ISBN: 978-0-11-322528-6 2006 Ed.

Immunisation against infectious disease, popularly known as The Green Book, provides information on vaccines for vaccine-preventable diseases. It acts as a guide to the UK's vaccination schedule for health professionals and health departments that give vaccines in the United Kingdom.

The first two editions were published in 1992 and 1996. A third edition in 2006, was the last to appear in print. Updates have since been added by its clinical editors through advice and recommendations from the Joint Committee on Vaccination and Immunisation (JCVI) and appear only online as individual chapters via the immunisation section of the GOV.UK website. As of 2021 it includes updates on COVID-19.

== Purpose ==
Immunisation against infectious disease is popularly known as The Green Book, to provide information on the UK's vaccination schedule and vaccines for vaccine preventable infectious diseases. It is a guide for health professionals and health departments that give vaccines in the UK. Updates are added by its clinical editors through advice and recommendations from the Joint Committee on Vaccination and Immunisation (JCVI), as accepted by the Secretaries of State. Larger updates may also need consultations with UK health departments and public health bodies, MHRA, vaccine manufacturers, NHS England, National Travel Health Network and Centre (NaTHNaC), as well as the clinical editors.

== Publication ==
The first two editions were published by the HMSO in 1992 and 1996. The third edition, published by The Stationery Office in 2006, replaced the 1996 edition and was the last to appear in print.

== 2006 edition ==
The 2006 edition of The Green book has 468 pages, divided generally into two parts, preceded by a contents page, acknowledgements and preface, and followed by two indexes, one of vaccines by proprietary name and the other of vaccines by common name.

=== Part one: principles, practices and procedures ===
Part one, titled "principles, practice and procedures", has 12 chapters which include how vaccines work, storage and distribution, vaccine safety and adverse events, immunisation schedule and immunisation of healthcare and laboratory staff. How to give a vaccine is described in chapter four, common side effects in chapter eight and how to fill in a yellow card in chapter nine (updated 2013).

- Immunity and how vaccines work
- Consent
- Storage, distribution and disposal of vaccines
- Immunisation procedures
- Immunisation by nurses and other health professionals
- Contraindications and special considerations
- Immunisation of individuals with underlying medical conditions
- Vaccine safety and adverse events following immunisation
- Surveillance and monitoring for vaccine safety
- Vaccine Damage Payment Scheme
- Immunisation schedule
- Immunisation of healthcare and laboratory staff

=== Part two: diseases, vaccinations and vaccines ===
Diseases and their vaccines are listed in alphabetical order and include all vaccines recommended in the routine immunisation programme for all children in the UK. Vaccine requirements for travellers and for contacts of people with infectious disease are included. The 2006 edition incorporated the then new vaccines for meningococcal group C and pneumococcal infections, included the cessation of the school's BCG programme and the introduction of the Hib-MenC booster at 12 months of age.

Diseases included:

- Anthrax
- Cholera
- Diphtheria
- Haemophilus influenzae type b (Hib)
- Hepatitis A
- Hepatitis B
- Influenza
- Japanese encephalitis
- Measles
- Meningococcal
- Mumps
- Pertussis
- Pneumococcal
- Polio
- Rabies
- Rubella
- Smallpox and vaccinia
- Tetanus
- Tick-borne encephalitis
- Tuberculosis
- Typhoid
- Varicella
- Yellow fever

== Online version ==
The online version was published in 2013. Updates appear only online as individual chapters via the immunisation section of the GOV.UK website. These have included respiratory syncytial virus and rotavirus in 2015, and human papillomavirus in 2019. As of 2021, the online version stays divided into two parts, in the same way as the 2006 edition, and includes updates on shingles and COVID-19.

According to Andrew Pollard, The Green Book should be "bookmarked" in all child clinics and notes that similar information can be obtained from the US Centers for Disease Control and Prevention website. It is a recommended source by the Royal College of Paediatrics and Child Health.

== Editors ==
- 1996 - David Salisbury, Norman T. Begg
- 2006 - David Salisbury, Mary Ramsay, Karen Noakes
- 2021 - Mary Ramsay
