= OVG =

OVG may refer to:

- Oxford Vaccine Group, a vaccine research group within the Department of Paediatrics at the University of Oxford
- Oak View Group, an American global advisory, development and investment company for the sports and live entertainment industries
