= JCVI =

JCVI may refer to:

- J. Craig Venter Institute, a multidisciplinary genomic-focused organization in the United States
- Joint Committee on Vaccination and Immunisation, an independent expert advisory committee of the United Kingdom Department of Health
