= Ian Hudson =

British physician

Ian Robert Burton Hudson is a British physician and former government official who served as the chief executive of the Medicines and Healthcare products Regulatory Agency (MHRA) from 2013 to 2019. He later became Senior Advisor, Integrated Development, Global Health for the Bill and Melinda Gates Foundation. He retired in February 2024. He was appointed an OBE for services to healthcare in the 2020 New Year Honours.

== Career ==
Hudson practised as a paediatrician from 1982 to 1989, and then worked in clinical research and development in the pharmaceutical industry, lately as a vice president of SmithKline Beecham, between 1989 and 2001. In 2001 he became director of the licensing division of the then-Medicines Control Agency. He was also the UK delegate to the European Medicines Agency's Committee for Human Medicinal Products, CHMP, (2002–2013), latterly its vice chair and honorary Senior Lecturer in Clinical Pharmacology, William Harvey Research Institute, Queen Mary and Westfield College, university of London (2007–2012). In September 2013 he became chief executive of the Medicines and Healthcare products Regulatory Agency, succeeding Sir Kent Woods.

Hudson was also a member of the European Medicines Agency's management board, a member of the Heads of Medicines Agencies of Europe Management Group and chaired the International Coalition of Medicines Regulatory Authorities between 2016 and 2019. He retired from the MHRA in 2019 and then worked as a senior advisor, Integrated Development, Bill and Melinda Gates Foundation until retiring in February 2024. He was also the Chair of the International Review Panel for clinical trial accreditation, UKCRC Clinical Trials Unit Network, a member of the Centre for Innovation in Regulatory Science scientific advisory board, and a member of the scientific advisory council of TOPRA. He was appointed an OBE in the 2020 New Year Honours for services to healthcare. His appointment to the order was annulled in October 2026.

== Regulatory issues and OBE Forfeiture ==
In February 2026, Dr Hudson was removed from the register of the General Medical Council, following a hearing by the Medical Practitioners Tribunal Service, which found his fitness to practice impaired due to his failure to disclose previous convictions for child sex offences.

In October 2026 Dr Hudson’s OBE was revoked by the Honours Forfeiture Committee.

== See also ==
- June Raine, CEO of the MHRA from 2019
