= Anthony Harnden =

English academic

Anthony Harnden MB FRCGP is a British medical practitioner and academic who is the chair of the Medicines and Healthcare products Regulatory Agency (MHRA). He is a professor of primary care at the University of Oxford and until December 2024 was a registrant council member of the General Medical Council and chair of the Remuneration Committee.

He was also deputy chair of the Joint Committee on Vaccination and Immunisation (JVCI), advising the UK government on ensuring public trust and patient safety during the distribution of the COVID vaccine. Earlier he worked as a general practitioner in Wheatley, Oxfordshire. He is particularly focused on protecting patient safety through robust surveillance and embracing risk-proportionate regulation to maintain the UK as a global regulator of excellence. He is an Honorary Fellow of St Hugh's College, Oxford.

== Career ==
Anthony Harnden’s clinical and research interests have been in primary care paediatrics, specifically common childhood infection, vaccine preventable infection, the early diagnosis of serious disease and clinical trials in children. He has published research papers on influenza, whooping cough, the development of quality indicators for the care of children in UK general practice, Kawasaki disease and confidential enquiries in child deaths in both the UK and Africa. He developed the successful British Medical Journal series Easily Missed in 2009 to improve diagnosis in primary care and remains a series adviser.

During his career, Anthony has worked in a number of notable roles across the healthcare sector, including:

- Chair of the MHRA (2024 to present)
- Board member of the GMC (2017–2024) and Chair of the GMC remuneration committee (2021–2024)
- Director of Graduate Studies in the Department of Primary Care Health Sciences, University of Oxford (2017–2022)
- Deputy Chair of the JVCI, which advises the UK government on vaccine policy, including the COVID-19 vaccination programme (2015–2024)
- Inaugural Chairman of WHO Global Network of National Immunisation Groups (2017–2019)
- National Clinical Champion for Child Health, Royal College of General Practitioners (2010–2011)
- Primary care lead for the Confidential Enquiry in Child Deaths (2004–2008)

== Achievements ==
Anthony has published over 145 research papers, including two Royal College of GPs Research Papers of the Year. He has published two books, including Promoting Child Health in Primary Care

In September 2015, Harnden won (along with co-authors) the Ig Nobel Diagnostic Medicine Prize for "determining that acute appendicitis can be accurately diagnosed by the amount of pain evident when the patient is driven over speed bumps". In November 2022 he was awarded the President's Medal by the Royal College of General Practitioners.

== Personal life ==
Anthony has been married to Karin since 1989. They have three children.
