= Vaccine Taskforce =

Non-departmental body coordinating efforts to introduce a COVID-19 vaccine

The Vaccine Taskforce in the United Kingdom of Great Britain and Northern Ireland was set up in April 2020 by the Second Johnson ministry, in collaboration with Chief Scientific Advisor Patrick Vallance and Chief Medical Officer Professor Chris Whitty, in order to facilitate the path towards the introduction of a COVID-19 vaccine in the UK and its global distribution. The taskforce coordinated the research efforts of government with industry, academics and funding agencies in order to expedite vaccine development and deployment.

The minister responsible for the body was the Secretary of State for Health and Social Care, although the body was a joint unit of the Department of Health and Social Care and the Department for Business, Energy and Industrial Strategy. Oversight was by the Parliamentary Under-Secretary of State for COVID-19 Vaccine Deployment, and in November 2020 the first person to take this role was Nadhim Zahawi MP.

The Vaccine Taskforce closed in autumn 2022. Its role in vaccine supply was merged into the UK Health Security Agency, and its work in bringing vaccine manufacture in-country transferred to the Office for Life Sciences.

== History ==
The body was set up in April 2020 by the Government's Chief Scientific Advisor, Sir Patrick Vallance.

On 16 May 2020, venture capitalist Kate Bingham was named to chair the body. On 1 July, Bingham told the Science and Technology Select Committee that Sarah Gilbert and "Oxford University (are) leading the world in developing a vaccine against COVID-19 and [this] offers the best chance of having something protective against the virus as we go into winter."

On 12 September, it came to light that Sir John Bell was a member of the body.

On 14 October, aiming to manage public expectations, Bingham stated that a vaccine for COVID-19 was expected to be no more efficacious than the flu vaccine, which immunises against the influenza virus with around 50 per cent success. She added: "We shouldn't assume it's going to be better than a flu vaccine, because that's an equivalent – it's a mutating … respiratory virus that gets in through the nose and eyes and respiratory tract".

Speaking to BBC Scotland's The Seven on 17 October, Bingham said that the government would have to arrive at an agreement with the Joint Committee on Vaccination and Immunisation (JCVI) as to how any COVID-19 vaccine should be distributed; the staff of care homes and the elderly were likely to be prioritised. She stated that initially there would be a limited supply any COVID-19 vaccine.

On 18 October 2020, SAGE committee member, Sir Jeremy Farrar, commented on Sophy Ridge On Sunday that the Vaccine Taskforce "has done an absolutely extraordinary job" and the country is in an "extraordinarily strong position" with regard to the line-up of possible vaccines.

A government press release of 20 October shed further light on the initial formation of the taskforce, stating that it was created under the auspices of the Department for Business, Energy and Industrial Strategy (BEIS) in May 2020. Nadhim Zahawi was appointed to the new role of Parliamentary Under-Secretary of State for COVID-19 Vaccine Deployment on 28 November 2020, with responsibility for the taskforce. On 1 March 2021, ministerial responsibility transferred from BEIS to the Secretary of State for Health and Social Care, and the taskforce became a joint unit of BEIS and the Department of Health and Social Care.

The task force's procurement personnel were awarded the Chartered Institute of Procurement & Supply's "Procurement Team of the Year" and "Public Procurement Project of the Year" accolades in 2021. Their professional collaborative work with suppliers was also acknowledged by Prime Minister Boris Johnson, who wrote to the taskforce in February 2021 stating that their work with suppliers had been "invaluable and [was] now reaping benefits for the whole world".

== Personnel ==
On 14 June 2021, the microbiologist Sir Richard Sykes was appointed chair of the Vaccine Taskforce.

As of June 2022, the director-general of the taskforce is Madelaine McTernan.

=== Steering group ===
In June 2021, the Department for Business, Energy and Industrial Strategy confirmed in response to a Freedom of Information Act request that the taskforce's formal steering group had been disbanded, with the taskforce now being managed by a senior leadership team of civil servants and experts, with Sir Richard Sykes as its external chair.

=== Former membership ===
Until November 2020, the membership of the taskforce was unknown. A Freedom of Information Act request to obtain the membership was responded to with three pages of redacted names. As of that month, the steering group was made up of:

- Kate Bingham, chair
- Clive Dix, deputy chair
- Nick Elliott, Director-General, Department for Business, Energy and Industrial Strategy (BEIS)
- Ruth Todd, Director, BEIS
- Madelaine McTernan, Director, UK Government Investments
- Tim Colley, Director, BEIS
- Dan Osgood, Director, BEIS
- Divya Chadha Manek, National Institute for Health Research
- Ian McCubbin, Manufacturing Advisor – former Senior Vice President for Global Manufacturing and Supply at GlaxoSmithKline
- Steve Bates, Chief Executive Officer, BioIndustry Association
- Professor Jonathan Van-Tam, Clinical and Public Health Adviser to the VTF, Deputy Chief Medical Officer, Department of Health and Social Care
- Representatives of other government departments and public sector organisations, who attended steering group meetings as required

== Developments ==
On 20 October 2020, the Financial Times reported that potential COVID-19 vaccines would be selected for testing by the taskforce towards the end of the first quarter of 2021, but this was dependent on the outcome of "characterisation studies". The article also mentioned funding of £33.6 million being provided by government to accelerate the development of new COVID-19 vaccines by exposing human trial participants to the coronavirus in controlled conditions around 30 days after having received a shortlisted vaccine. The work of the taskforce was bolstered by a further tranche of £19.7 million in funding for clinical trial-related blood testing facilities at Public Health England, specifically at PHE Porton Down.

On 22 October, Oxford Immunotec announced that the company had been chosen by the taskforce to be the unique supplier of T cell testing for SARS-Cov-2. The move was underscored with a £3 million investment, as the Business Secretary, Alok Sharma, emphasised the importance of T cell diagnostic capabilities in assessing the performance of candidate vaccines within COVID-19 vaccine trials.

On 27 October 2020, an article by Bingham was published in The Lancet. It highlighted the taskforce's overall strategy of a diverse portfolio of vaccines, with an emphasis on those thought capable of achieving an immune response in the over-65s. From an initial pool of 240 potential vaccines, the taskforce selected six candidates which employ four varied methods: adenoviral vectors, mRNA, adjuvanted proteins, and whole inactivated viral vaccines. The article also revealed that Clive Dix was the taskforce's deputy chair. It was reported the following day that Bingham had warned in the Lancet article that first-generation COVID-19 vaccines would probably not be perfect, and would only lessen symptoms rather than prevent infection and that they "might not work for everyone or for long".

== Related bodies ==
The Department of Health and Social Care set up an Antivirals Taskforce in April 2021, to identify and deploy post-infection antiviral medicines which could be taken by people at home. By September 2022, the name of the body had changed to the COVID-19 Antivirals and Therapeutics Taskforce.

== See also ==
- Joint Committee on Vaccination and Immunisation
- COVID-19 vaccination in the United Kingdom
