= Wei Shen Lim =

Singaporean respiratory physician based in England

Wei Shen Lim KBE is a Singaporean consultant respiratory physician and honorary professor of medicine based in Nottingham University Hospitals NHS Trust, England.

== Biography ==
Lim was born in Singapore and attended Anglo-Chinese Junior College before studying at the University of Nottingham Medical School. He graduated in 1991 and spent several years with Tan Tock Seng Hospital and Singapore General Hospital before his specialist training as a respiratory consultant at Nottingham.

Lim has been on the specialist register for General Internal Medicine and Respiratory Medicine since 2002. Since November 2020 or earlier, he has been chairman of the COVID-19 subcommittee of the Joint Committee on Vaccination and Immunisation which provides advice to the UK government.

In 2021 and in 2022, he received more than £25,001 in research funding from vaccine-maker Pfizer.

=== Awards ===
In 2024, Lim was appointed as Honorary Knight Commander of the Order of the British Empire (KBE) for services to the COVID-19 vaccination programme.
