= Churchill Hospital =

Teaching hospital in Oxford, England

Coordinates: 51.7493834°N 1.2156712°W

- Oxford University Hospitals NHS Trust
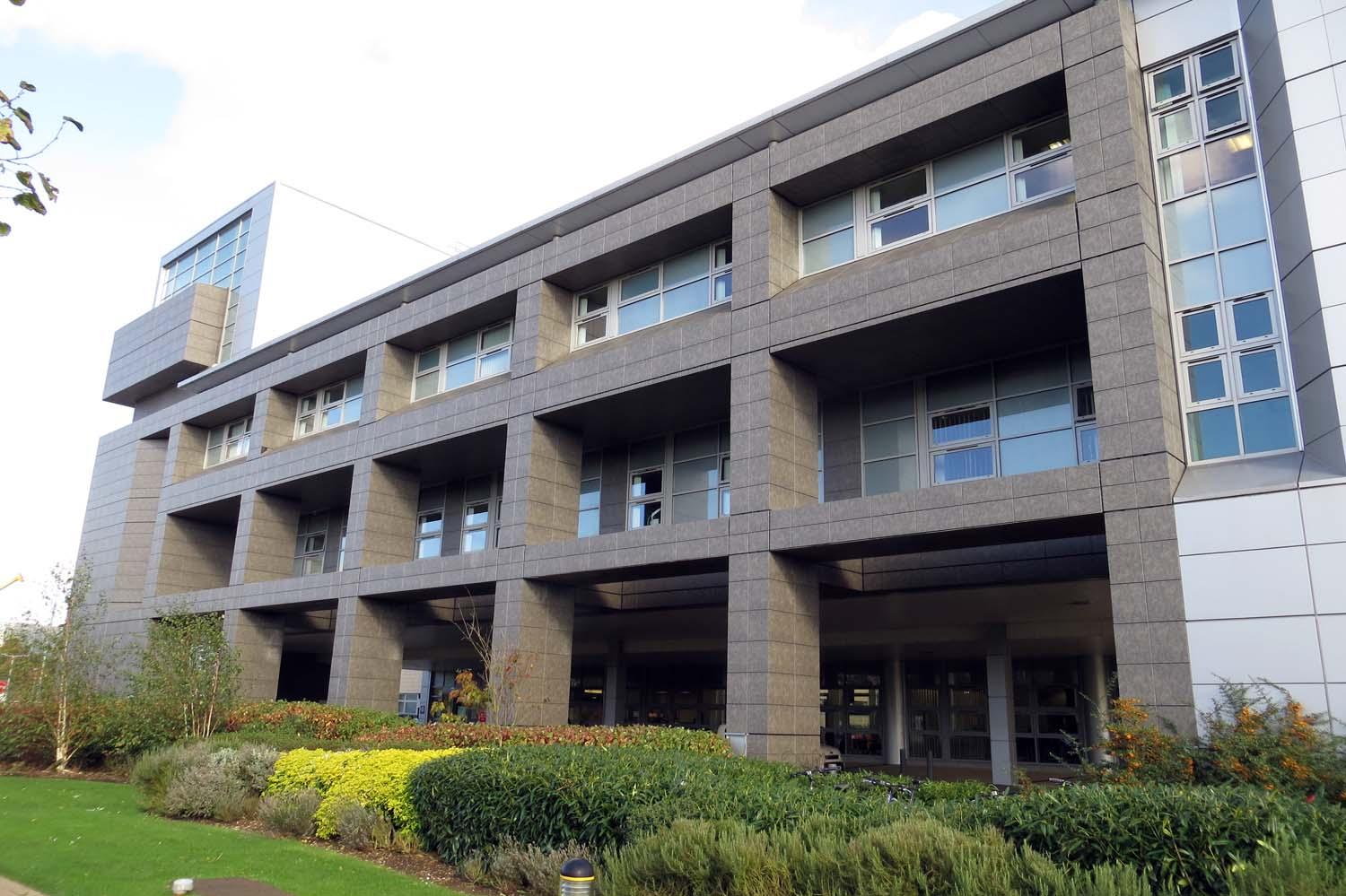
- The front of Churchill Hospital

- Location within Oxfordshire

Geography
- Location: Oxford, Oxfordshire, England, United Kingdom

Organisation
- Care system: Public NHS
- Type: Teaching
- Affiliated university: University of Oxford; Oxford Brookes University

Services
- Emergency department: No Accident & Emergency
- Beds: 180 in-patient 100 day care

History
- Founded: 1942

Links
- Website: https://www.ouh.nhs.uk/hospitals/churchill/
- Lists: Hospitals in England

The Churchill Hospital is a teaching hospital in Oxford, England. It is managed by the Oxford University Hospitals NHS Foundation Trust.

== History ==
The original hospital on the site was built in 1940 with the intention of providing medical aid to people suffering orthopaedic injuries as a result of air raids during the Second World War. This proved unnecessary, and the building was leased to the United States Army medical services, who were relocating from Basingstoke. The new American hospital was named after Sir Winston Churchill, the then Prime Minister, and was opened by the Duchess of Kent on 27 January 1942.

The US Army left the hospital at the end of the war and it was taken over by the local council and reopened as a conventional hospital in January 1946. The Churchill Hospital came under common management with the John Radcliffe Hospital in April 1993 and with the Nuffield Orthopaedic Centre in November 2011. New cancer treatment facilities were procured under a Private Finance Initiative contract in 2005. The new facility, which was built by a joint venture of Alfred McAlpine and Impregilo at a cost of £125 million, opened in 2009.

On 4 January 2021, the hospital was the first to administer the University of Oxford and AstraZeneca's AZD1222 COVID-19 vaccine (outside trials). This started the UK's rollout of the second vaccine to enter the programme. Brian Pinker, 82, was the recipient.

== Facilities ==
As well as being an important centre for the treatment of cancer patients, the Churchill specialises in kidney transplants, diabetes, endocrinology, oncology, dermatology, haemophilia, infectious diseases, chest medicine, medical genetics and palliative care.

== See also ==
- John Radcliffe Hospital
- Radcliffe Infirmary
- Old Road Campus
- Oxford Vaccine Group
- List of hospitals in England
- List of former United States Army medical units
