= Andrew Pollard (immunologist) =

British immunologist and vaccinologist (born 1965)

Sir Andrew Pollard FHEA FMedSci FRS
- Born: 29 August 1965 (age 61); Tunbridge Wells, England, UK
- Education: Guy's Hospital Medical School; St Bartholomew’s Hospital Medical School; Imperial College London
- Occupations: Professor of Paediatric Infection and Immunity
- Known for: Chief Investigator on the University of Oxford COVID-19 Vaccine (ChAdOx-1 n-CoV-19), Director of Oxford Vaccine Group, Chair of JCVI
- Scientific career
- Workplaces: University of Oxford
- Thesis: Age-related changes in immunity to Neisseria meningitidis (1999)
- Website: www.ovg.ox.ac.uk/team/andrew-pollard

Sir Andrew John Pollard FHEA FMedSci FRS (born 29 August 1965) is the Ashall Professor of Infection & Immunity at the University of Oxford and a Fellow of St Cross College, Oxford. He is an honorary consultant paediatrician at John Radcliffe Hospital and the director of the Oxford Vaccine Group. He is the chief investigator on the University of Oxford COVID-19 Vaccine (ChAdOx-1 n-CoV-19) trials and has led research on vaccines for many life-threatening infectious diseases, including typhoid fever, Neisseria meningitidis, Haemophilus influenzae type b, streptococcus pneumoniae, pertussis, influenza, rabies, and Ebola.

Because "In order to prevent any perceived conflict of interest it was agreed that the Joint Committee on Vaccination and Immunisation (JCVI) Chair (Professor Andrew Pollard), who is involved in the development of a SARS-CoV-2 vaccine at Oxford, would recuse himself from all JCVI COVID-19 meetings", JCVI Deputy Chair Professor Anthony Harnden acts in his stead on these matters.

Pollard was awarded the James Spence Medal by the Royal College of Paediatrics and Child Health (RCPCH) in 2022.

== Education ==
Pollard attended St Peter's Catholic School, Bournemouth, where he was head boy. He attended Guy's Hospital Medical School graduating with a BSc in 1986, and subsequently obtained an MBBS from the University of London (1989) at St Bartholomew's Hospital Medical School, where he was awarded the Wheelwright's Prize in Paediatrics (1988) and Honours Colours. After house jobs at Barts and Whipps Cross Hospital and working as an A&E senior house officer at the Whittington Hospital, London, he trained in Paediatrics at Birmingham Children's Hospital, UK, specialising in Paediatric Infectious Diseases at St Mary's Hospital, London, and at British Columbia Children's Hospital, Vancouver. He obtained his PhD at St Mary's Hospital, from the University of London in 1999.

== Career ==
He chaired the scientific panel of the Spencer Dayman Meningitis Laboratories Charitable Trust (2002–2006) and was a member of the scientific committee of the Meningitis Research Foundation (2009–2014). He is currently chair of trustees of the Knoop Trust and a trustee of the Jenner Vaccine Foundation. Pollard has been the chair of the UK's JCVI since 2013, but does not participate in the COVID-19 vaccine Committee. Pollard has been a member of the WHO Strategic Advisory Group of Experts (SAGE) on Immunization since 2016. He was Director of Graduate Studies in the Department of Paediatrics at the University of Oxford 2012-2020 and was Vice-Master of the University of Oxford's St Cross College, Oxford 2017–2021 and remains a Fellow of the college. He has been a member of the British Commission on Human Medicines' Clinical Trials, Biologicals and Vaccines expert advisory group since 2013, and chaired the European Medicines Agency Scientific Advisory Group on Vaccines over the years between 2012 and 2020.

== Honours and awards ==
Pollard has received multiple awards throughout his career. For example, he received the “Science Honor and Truth Award” of the Instituto de Patologia en la Altura in La Paz, Bolivia in 2002. He was elected a Fellow of the Academy of Medical Sciences in 2016. In 2020, Pollard received the Oxford University Vice Chancellor's Innovation Award for his work on typhoid vaccines. In 2021, Pollard was knighted in the Birthday Honours for services to public health, particularly during the COVID-19 pandemic. In 2022, Brazil awarded him the Order of Medical Merit. He was elected as a Fellow of the Royal Society (FRS) in 2024.

== Publications ==
As of April 2021, Pollard has published five books (including one on mountaineering), six book chapters, 12 conference papers, and 647 journal articles. His most cited works are:

- Pollard, AJ; Perrett, KP; Beverley, PC (2009). "Maintaining protection against invasive bacteria with protein–polysaccharide conjugate vaccines". Nature Reviews Immunology. 9 (3): 213–220. doi:10.1038/nri2494. PMID 19214194. S2CID 20211443.
- Gossger, N; Snape, MD; Yu, L; Pollard, Andrew J (2012). "Immunogenicity and Tolerability of Recombinant Serogroup B Meningococcal Vaccine Administered With or Without Routine Infant Vaccinations According to Different Immunization Schedules: A Randomized Controlled Trial". JAMA. 307 (6). European MenB Vaccine Study Group: 573–582. doi:10.1001/jama.2012.85. hdl:2158/649844. PMID 22318278.
- McKinney, Eoin F; Lyons, Paul A; Carr, Edward J; Hollis, Jane L; Jayne, David RW; Willcocks, Lisa C; Koukoulaki, Maria; Brazma, Alvis; Jovanovic, Vojislav; Kemeny, D Michael; Pollard, Andrew J (2010). "A CD8+ T cell transcription signature predicts prognosis in autoimmune disease". Nature Medicine. 16 (5): 586–591. doi:10.1038/nm.2130. PMC 3504359. PMID 20400961.
- Findlow, Jamie; Borrow, Ray; Pollard, Andrew J (2010). "Multicenter, Open-Label, Randomized Phase II Controlled Trial of an Investigational Recombinant Meningococcal Serogroup B Vaccine With and Without Outer Membrane Vesicles, Administered in Infancy". Clinical Infectious Diseases. 51 (10): 1127–1137. doi:10.1086/656741. PMID 20954968.
- Pace, David; Pollard, Andrew J (2012). "Meningococcal disease: Clinical presentation and sequelae". Vaccine. 30 (2): B3–B9. doi:10.1016/j.vaccine.2011.12.062. PMID 22607896.

== Personal life ==
Pollard is an avid runner, cyclist, and mountaineer.
