= Valneva COVID-19 vaccine =

Vaccine against COVID-19

Vaccine description
- Target: SARS-CoV-2
- Vaccine type: Inactivated

Clinical data
- Other names: VLA2001, VLA2101, COVID-19 Vaccine (inactivated, adjuvanted) Valneva
- Routes of administration: Intramuscular
- ATC code: J07BN03 (WHO)

Legal status
- Legal status: UK: POM (Prescription only); EU: Rx-only

Identifiers
- CAS Number: 2695500-31-1

Valneva COVID-19 vaccine (VLA2001) is a COVID-19 vaccine developed by European specialty vaccine company Valneva SE in collaboration with the American biopharmaceutical company Dynavax Technologies.

In April 2022, the United Kingdom Medicines and Healthcare products Regulatory Agency (MHRA) approved the vaccine, being the first in the world to do so. It was authorized for medical use in the European Union in June 2022.

Withdrawal of the marketing authorisation for Valneva's COVID-19 vaccine was granted in Europe on 12 October 2023.

== Technology ==
It is a whole whole inactivated virus vaccine, grown in culture using the Vero cell line and inactivated with β-propiolactone (BPL). It also contains two adjuvants: alum and CpG 1018. It uses the same manufacturing technology as Valneva's IXIARO® vaccine for Japanese encephalitis.

== History ==
=== Clinical trials ===
Valneva COVID-19 vaccine completed phase I/II trial with 153 participants in the United Kingdom. The trials were supported by the UK National Institute for Health Research and four British universities.

In April 2021, Valneva COVID-19 vaccine commenced phase III trials with approximately 4,000 participants. In August 2021, New Zealand was chosen for trialing on 300 adult volunteers, due to low case numbers and slow vaccine rollout. Positive results for the phase III trials were reported in October 2021.

Results from the Phase III COV-COMPARE trial were published in The Lancet Infectious Diseases in 2022. The randomized trial compared the immunogenicity and safety of VLA2001 with the Oxford-AstraZeneca COVID-19 vaccine in adults in the United Kingdom, providing peer-reviewed evidence from the vaccine's clinical development program.

== Society and culture ==
=== Legal status ===
United Kingdom

In April 2022, Valneva COVID-19 vaccine was approved by the United Kingdom's Medicines and Healthcare products Regulatory Agency (MHRA).

United Arab Emirates

In May 2022, the company announced that Valneva COVID-19 vaccine was granted emergency use authorization from the United Arab Emirates (UAE).

European Union

In May 2022, the European Union's drug regulator, the European Medicines Agency (EMA), accepted Valneva's filing of a marketing authorization for Valneva COVID-19 vaccine.

In June 2022, the EMA announced that it would propose to authorize COVID-19 Vaccine (inactivated, adjuvanted) Valneva in the EU, primarily for vaccination of people aged 18 to 50 years. It was authorized for medical use in the European Union in June 2022.

=== Economics ===
In September 2020, Valneva reached an agreement with Dynavax to help manufacture up to 100 million doses of vaccine in 2021 at its facility in Livingston, Scotland, and to provide up to 190 million doses over a 5-year period to the UK government. Due to government support, Valneva progressed immediately into Phase III trials and develop production capacity before the full evaluation of the Phase I/II trial, rather than the traditional slower sequential approach which has lower financial risk.

In September 2021, Valneva announced that the UK government had cancelled the vaccine order. The cancellation reason was not officially given, but seems to be related to difficulties getting building materials due to Brexit and not vaccine quality.

In November 2021, the European Commission approved a contract with Valneva providing the possibility to purchase almost 27 million doses of its vaccine in 2022. This also includes the possibility to adapt the vaccine to new variants as well as the order of an additional 33 million vaccine doses in 2023.

Valneva COVID-19 vaccine was granted a marketing authorization in the European Union in June 2022. In October 2023, the authorization was withdrawn for commercial reasons at the request Valneva Austria GmbH.
