= June Raine =

Chief executive of the MHRA

Dame June Raine DBE
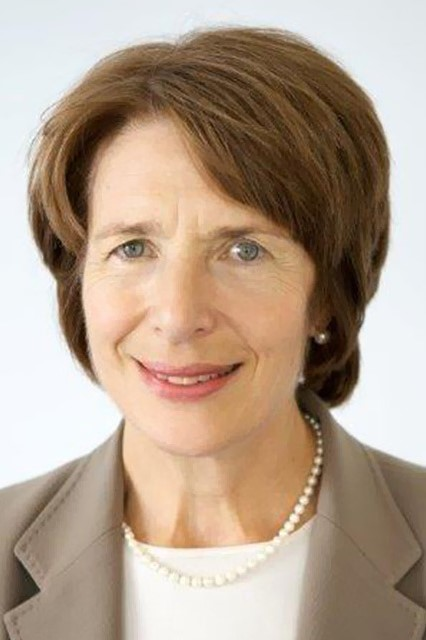
- Raine in 2019

Chief Executive for the MHRA
- In office 20 September 2019 – 1 April 2025
- Preceded by: Ian Hudson
- Succeeded by: Lawrence Tallon

Personal details
- Born: June Munro Harris; 1952 (age 73–74) UK
- Education: University of Oxford (BA, MSc, BM BCh)

Dame June Munro Raine DBE (née Harris; born 1952), is a British doctor who served as the chief executive officer of the Medicines and Healthcare products Regulatory Agency (MHRA) in the United Kingdom. Raine spent much of her career in the Medicines Division of the MHRA (and in its predecessor, in the Department of Health).

She came to wider public prominence in December 2020, when the MHRA was the first regulator to approve an mRNA vaccine for use in humans, and the first Western regulator to approve a COVID-19 vaccine, namely Pfizer and BioNTech's, BNT162b2.

== Education ==
Raine went to Somerville College, Oxford in 1971, where she obtained a BA degree in physiology in 1974, followed by an MSc in pharmacology in 1975. She subsequently studied at Oxford University Medical School where she obtained her BM BCh medical degree in 1978. Raine became a Member of the Royal College of Physicians (MRCP).

== Career ==
=== MHRA ===
In 1985, Raine joined the Department of Health and Social Security in the Medicines Division, before that function moved to the newly formed MHRA in 2003. In 2006, she was appointed as the director of vigilance and risk management in the Medicines Division, and in September 2019 was appointed CEO of the MHRA.

==== COVID-19 ====
On 2 December 2020, the MHRA became the first medicines regulator in history to approve an mRNA vaccine, granting "emergency authorisation" for BioNTech/Pfizer's BNT162b2 COVID-19 vaccine for "widespread use", seven days after its first Phase III eight-week trial. The Phase III trials for BNT162b2 do not fully complete until January 2023. Raine told reporters "no corners have been cut in approving it", and that "the benefits outweigh any risk".

The authorisation drew criticism from EU legislators, who called the MHRA's decision "hasty" and "problematic", and the European Medicines Agency (EMA) issued a statement that a longer approval procedure was needed using more detailed evidence and checks than the EMA's "emergency authorisation" route as chosen by Raine, given the novel nature of the vaccine and the potential scale of its distribution. The approval also drew initial critical comments from Anthony Fauci, who, after qualification of his comments, said that "Our process is one that takes more time than it takes in the UK. And that's just the reality", and "I did not mean to imply any sloppiness even though it came out that way".

On 2 December, the UK Government stated that the vaccine would be covered by the Vaccine Damage Payment Act 1979 – leading to a statutory £120,000 payment for anyone permanently harmed by the vaccine – and at the same time granted Pfizer legal indemnity. Raine said: "This recommendation has only been given by the MHRA, following the most rigorous scientific assessment of every piece of data, so that it meets the required strict standards of safety, of effectiveness, and of quality. We've also reviewed and agreed the prescribing information, so that the public and health care professionals are very clear and can be very confident that the vaccine is being used in the correct way, understanding what's involved."

On 7 December, Raine defended the MHRA's approval of BNT162b2 in an article she wrote for The Times titled: "Dr June Raine: How we backed a Covid vaccine before rest of the West".

=== Other roles ===
Raine chaired the European Pharmacovigilance Risk Assessment Committee on behalf of the European Medicines Agency for six years.

== Awards ==
She was appointed Commander of the Order of the British Empire (CBE) in the 2009 Birthday Honours and Dame Commander of the Order of the British Empire (DBE) in the 2022 New Year Honours for services to healthcare and the COVID-19 response.

== Personal life ==
Raine met her husband, Anthony Evan Gerald Raine, at Oxford University. He died of colon cancer in 1995, at the age of 46. They had two children.

== See also ==
- Ian Hudson, former CEO of the MHRA
