= Oxford Vaccine Group =

Research group of the University of Oxford

- Oxford Vaccine Group logo
- Formation: 1994
- Purpose: Research and clinical trials
- Location(s): Centre for Clinical Vaccinology and Tropical Medicine (CCVTM), Churchill Hospital, Oxford, England
- Director: Professor Andrew J Pollard
- Parent organization: University of Oxford
- Affiliations: UKCRC registered
- Staff: 75
- Website: www.ovg.ox.ac.uk

The Oxford Vaccine Group (OVG) is a vaccine research group within the Department of Paediatrics at the University of Oxford. It was founded in 1994 by Professor E. Richard Moxon, was initially based at the John Radcliffe Hospital, and moved in 2003 to its current location in the Centre for Clinical Vaccinology and Tropical Medicine (CCVTM) at the Churchill Hospital in Oxford, England. The group, led by Professor Andrew Pollard since 2001, comprises around 75 members across a number of disciplines, including consultants in paediatrics and vaccinology, clinical research fellows, research nurses, statisticians, post-doctoral laboratory scientists, research assistants and DPhil students.

OVG came to public prominence in 2020 for the vaccine it created to combat COVID-19.

== Aims and background ==
OVG carries out research on vaccines to improve human health. It works to enhance the understanding of immunity, studies the epidemiology of infectious diseases, and conducts clinical trials into new and improved vaccines for children and adults. Research by Richard Moxon into the public health impact of Haemophilus influenzae type b (Hib) invasive disease in the UK, and efficacy studies of the Hib conjugate vaccine in UK children, led to the founding of OVG in 1994. Since then OVG has particularly specialised in research into meningococcal disease and vaccines to prevent the disease. OVG has been involved with the development of the new vaccine against MenB which was licensed in Europe in 2013. The Group has also carried out research on pneumococcal vaccines, typhoid vaccines and, more recently, new vaccines against Ebola.

OVG is a research group within the Department of Paediatrics at the University of Oxford. It is a UK Clinical Research Collaboration (UKCRC) registered clinical trials unit working in collaboration with the Primary Care Unit Clinical Trials Unit (Nuffield Department of Primary Care Health Sciences) and the Jenner Institute at the University of Oxford. It is also a participant in the UK Paediatric Vaccine Group (UKPVG) and contributes to the Oxford University Hospitals NHS Trust’s tertiary Paediatric Infectious Disease and Immunology Service. All OVG trials are listed on the UK Clinical Trials Gateway. OVG supports the All Trials Campaign.

Professor Andrew Pollard, OVG’s Director, was appointed Chair of the Joint Committee on Vaccination and Immunisation (JCVI) in March 2014. Senior staff at OVG are periodically asked to give expert opinions on aspects of vaccines and infectious disease, especially meningococcal disease. For example the 2015 announcement that 14- to 18-year-olds in the UK are to be vaccinated against MenW disease, and the 2012 European Medicines Agency (EMA) recommendation for approval of a new meningitis B vaccine.

== Research activity ==
Since 2001, OVG has enrolled over 12,500 adults and children into clinical trials in the Thames Valley area of England. OVG research has included:

- 2003: a study looking at the mid- to long-term effectiveness of the Meningitis C vaccine. This research showed that immunity waned over time, and formed part of the evidence leading to the changes in the UK MenC vaccine schedule in 2013.
- 2005 onwards: collaborative projects with the paediatric department of Patan Hospital in Nepal, studying children admitted to the hospital with febrile illnesses and cases of typhoid, Haemophilus influenzae type b (Hib disease) and pneumonia, and evaluating carriage of Hib disease and Streptococcus pneumoniae.
- 2006: a study looking at the effectiveness of a new vaccine against the bird flu virus H5N1 in children and adults.
- 2006: a phase II trial of a new vaccine against MenB disease. This was the first time the vaccine had been used in babies. The trial results were successful and led to phase III trials and ultimately the licensing of the new vaccine, Bexsero, in 2013.
- 2009: a study comparing the effectiveness of two new vaccines against the swine flu virus H1N1 in children and adults.
- 2010: a study of a new quadrivalent meningococcal (MenACWY) vaccine.
- 2011 onwards: Ongoing participation in an EU Childhood Life-threatening Infectious Disease Study (EUCLIDS) work package looking at genetic responses to MenC and MenB vaccines.
- 2011 onwards: a series of challenge studies to test new vaccines against typhoid and paratyphoid fever.
- 2014-15: a phase 1 study into a new vaccine against Ebola. In January 2015 this trial was commended in the House of Commons by Nicola Blackwood MP and Prime Minister David Cameron.
- 2020 onwards: a vaccine against COVID-19, the Oxford–AstraZeneca COVID-19 vaccine, has been created and approved, and as of 2021 is in worldwide use along several other vaccines such as the Pfizer–BioNTech COVID-19 vaccine.

== Funding ==
The OVG is funded not only by its alma mater and UK government bodies such as the Medical Research Council (MRC), National Institute for Health and Care Research (NIHR) and UK Research and Innovation (UKRI), and Public Health England (PHE), but also private UK charities like the Wellcome Trust, Meningitis Research Foundation, Meningitis UK and Action Medical Research.

The group has earned attention from international funders like the Bill & Melinda Gates Foundation (BMGF), the Global Alliance for Vaccines and Immunization (GAVI), and the World Health Organization (WHO) as well as undisclosed vaccine manufacturers.

The probable commercial success of the ChAdOx1-based AZD1222 product led the BMGF to prod the OVG into a deal with AstraZeneca under which the financial reward would be split between partners, instead of "donat(ing) the rights to its promising coronavirus vaccine to any drugmaker" in a misguided effort "to provide medicines preventing or treating COVID-19 at a low cost or free of charge." Under the extant deal, the OVG (or the trustees of Oxford University) will have another revenue stream with which to finance its activities.

== Vaccine Knowledge Project ==
In 2011, the group launched the Vaccine Knowledge Project, funded by the Oxford Biomedical Research Centre. The project website aims to provide independent, evidence-based information about vaccines and infectious diseases. The NHS Choices website lists the Vaccine Knowledge website as a recommended external link on several of its pages. The website has also been referenced in the national media in the UK, particularly during the 2014-15 US measles outbreak originating in Disneyland California. The project is a member of the Vaccine Safety Net.

== Awards ==
In November 2021 the team were awarded a Pride of Britain Award for their work on the COVID-19 vaccine.
