= Medicines and Healthcare products Regulatory Agency =

Medicine regulation agency in the UK

Executive agency overview
- Formed: 1 April 2003; 23 years ago
- Preceding agencies: Medicines Control Agency; Medical Devices Agency
- Headquarters: 10 South Colonnade, London E14 United Kingdom
- Executive agency executives: Lawrence Tallon, Chief Executive; Anthony Harnden, Chair
- Parent department: Department of Health and Social Care
- Website: www.gov.uk/mhra

The Medicines and Healthcare products Regulatory Agency (MHRA) is an executive agency of the Department of Health and Social Care, that regulates medicines, medical devices and blood components for transfusion in the UK.

The agency plays a central role in protecting public health by regulating products used in healthcare across the UK and has offices in London, Hertfordshire and Leeds. It also provides scientific advice to the life sciences sector and contributes to the development of regulatory policy and standards at national and international levels.

== Responsibilities ==
The MHRA's responsibilities are to:

- ensure medicines, medical devices and blood components for transfusion meet applicable standards of safety, quality and efficacy (effectiveness)
- secure safe supply chain for medicines, medical devices and blood components
- promote international standardisation and harmonisation to assure the effectiveness and safety of biological medicines
- educate the UK public and healthcare professionals about the risks and benefits of medicines, medical devices and blood components, leading to safer and more effective use
- enable innovation and research and development that is beneficial to public health
- collaborate with partners in the UK and internationally to support its mission to enable the earliest access to safe medicines and medical devices and to protect public health.

== Governance ==
The MHRA operates as an executive agency of the Department of Health and Social Care. It is led by a chief executive, who is accountable to the Secretary of State for Health and Social Care. Lawrence Tallon assumed the role of chief executive in 2025, succeeding Dame June Raine who had held the post since 2019.

The agency is governed by a board of directors and a chairperson. The current chair of the MHRA is Anthony Harnden.

A number of committees and expert groups provide independent scientific and clinical advice on regulatory decisions.

== History ==
The MHRA was established in 2003 through the merger of the Medicines Control Agency (MCA) and the Medical Devices Agency (MDA). The creation of a single regulator was intended to streamline oversight of medicines and medical devices and strengthen the UK's ability to respond to emerging safety issues.

Following the United Kingdom's withdrawal from the European Union, the MHRA assumed additional responsibilities that had previously been carried out through EU regulatory frameworks, including the independent licensing of medicines for the UK market.

== Funding ==
The MHRA is funded through a combination of grant-in-aid from the UK government and income generated from fees and charges levied on the pharmaceutical, medical device, and life sciences industries for regulatory services. These services include marketing authorisation applications, inspections, licensing, and scientific advice.

The level of government funding and fee income is set annually as part of the UK government's spending review and budgetary process. The MHRA publishes details of its financial performance, including income, expenditure, and fee structures, in its annual report and accounts.

== Notable interventions ==
COVID-19 vaccine authorisation

In December 2020, the MHRA became the first medicines regulator in the world to grant temporary authorisation for the Pfizer–BioNTech COVID-19 vaccine (BNT162b2), following a rolling review of clinical trial data on safety, quality, and efficacy. The decision enabled the rapid deployment of the vaccine across the United Kingdom.

Approval of Casgevy (exagamglogene autotemcel)

In 2023, the MHRA became the first regulatory authority globally to approve Casgevy (exagamglogene autotemcel), a CRISPR-based gene-editing therapy for the treatment of sickle cell disease and transfusion-dependent beta thalassaemia.

Decentralised manufacturing

In 2025, the MHRA published guidance for the regulation of innovative products manufactured at or close to the location where a patient receives care. This means that medicines with a very short shelf life, and highly personalised medicines, can more easily be made in or near a hospital setting and can be supplied to patients safely and more quickly. The MHRA said the guidance was "the first of its kind in the word".

Rare disease therapies

In 2025, the MHRA outlined proposals to reform the regulatory framework for rare disease treatments, aiming to reduce barriers to development and approval while maintaining high safety standards. The initiative focuses on improving evidence generation for small patient populations, strengthening post-market surveillance, and working with a Rare Disease Consortium of patients, academics, and industry to develop more flexible pathways for innovative and personalised therapies.

Artificial Intelligence Commission

The MHRA issued a guidance report in September 2026 recommending new laws to regulate the use of artificial intelligence in medical products. The commission on the Regulation of AI in Healthcare was tasked with advising the MHRA on a world-leading framework for the regulation of AI products, and heard representation from clinicians, other regulators, and global AI experts. Recommendations of the report included, among other things, post-approval monitoring of AI products, a patient right-to-know if AI is being used in their care, penalties for AI products that fail to meet standards, and a provisional licencing system for trials of such products.
