= Timeline of the COVID-19 pandemic in the United Kingdom (January–June 2021) =

Graph of COVID-19 cases for January–June 2021 from government data

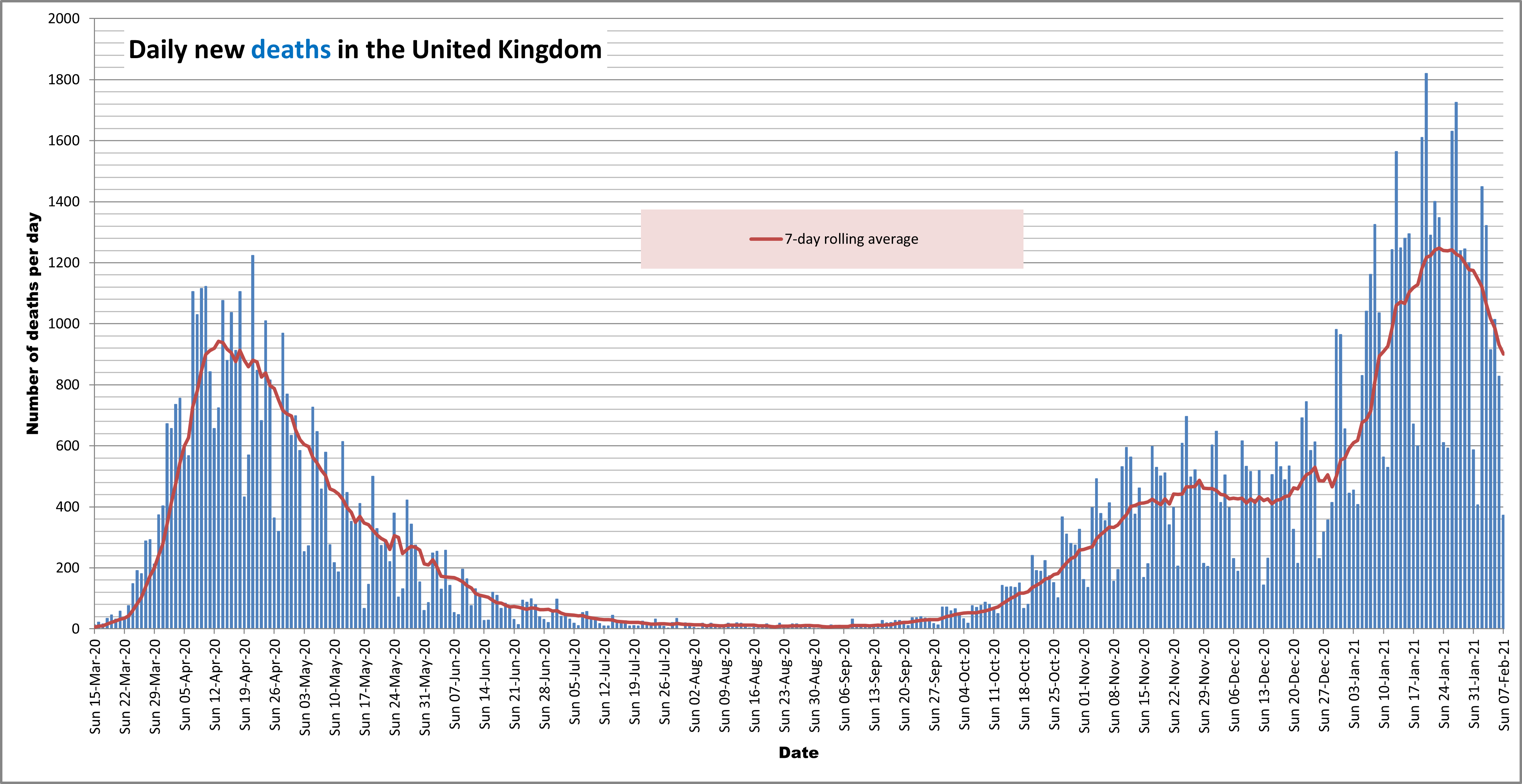
Graph of COVID-19 deaths for January–June 2021 from government data

The following is a timeline of the COVID-19 pandemic in the United Kingdom from January 2021 to June 2021.

There are significant differences in the legislation and the reporting between the countries of the UK: England, Scotland, Northern Ireland, and Wales. The numbers of cases and deaths are reported on a government Web site updated daily during the pandemic. The UK-wide COVID Symptom Study based on surveys of four million participants, endorsed by authorities in Scotland and Wales, run by health science company ZOE, and analysed by King's College London researchers, publishes daily estimates of the number of new and total current COVID-19 infections (excluding care homes) in UK regions, without restriction to only laboratory-confirmed cases.

== Events ==
=== January 2021 ===
==== 1 January ====
- New Year celebrations are quieter than normal because of COVID restrictions, but several instances of police breaking up illegal parties are reported all around the UK. They include a party at a 500-year-old church in Essex in which the building is damaged by revellers.
- The R number, the rate at which the virus is transmitted, is estimated to be between 1.1 and 1.3, but a study from Imperial College London suggests the new COVID strain may have actually increased the R number by between 0.4 and 0.7.
- Saffron Cordery, of NHS Providers, the body that represents hospital trusts, warns the next few weeks will be "nail-bitingly difficult" for the NHS, with staff absences because of the new variant of COVID.
- A further 53,285 COVID cases are recorded, along with 613 deaths.

==== 2 January ====
- As a further 57,725 COVID cases are recorded in the UK, the largest daily number so far, senior doctor Professor Andrew Goddard warns that hospitals across the UK could face the same level of pressure seen in London and the South East in recent days.
- Batches of the Oxford–AstraZeneca COVID-19 vaccine begin to arrive at hospitals throughout the UK in preparation for vaccination to begin on Monday 4 January.
- Fiona Godlee, an editor of The BMJ, has asked The New York Times to correct an article that claimed health officials in the UK will allow people to receive doses of two different COVID vaccines, describing the story as one that is "seriously misleading and requires urgent correction".
- BBC News reports that a number of healthcare workers have criticised the process involved in becoming verified to administer the vaccine, which include answering questions on whether they are trained in how to prevent radicalisation.

==== 3 January ====
- A further 54,990 COVID-19 cases are recorded, the sixth day the daily figure has exceeded 50,000.
- Hospitalized COVID patients reaches 26,626, with 24,316 patients in general beds; COVID represents 30% of NHS hospital capacity.
- On the eve of the rollout of the Oxford–AstraZeneca COVID-19 vaccine, Prime Minister Boris Johnson says that he expects "tens of millions" of COVID-19 vaccinations to be given over the coming three months; 530,000 doses of the vaccine are ready at hospitals and GPs surgeries to be administered.
- Boots and Tesco have offered to help with the rollout of COVID-19 vaccinations.
- Jo Stevens, the Shadow Secretary of State for Digital, Culture, Media and Sport and MP for Cardiff Central, is reported to be in hospital where she is receiving treatment for COVID-19.

==== 4 January ====
- Brian Pinker, 82, becomes the first person in the country to receive the Oxford–AstraZeneca COVID-19 vaccine as vaccinations using the vaccine begin in the UK.
- Margaret Ferrier, the MP for Rutherglen and Hamilton West, is arrested by Scottish police and charged in connection with "alleged culpable and reckless conduct" for using public transport while experiencing COVID symptoms.
- Prime Minister Boris Johnson later confirms that England will enter a third lockdown from 5 January, with similar restrictions to the first lockdown in March 2020, including school closures to all pupils except from children of keyworkers and vulnerable children.
- Another lockdown is announced in England and Scotland.
- The UK's chief medical officers recommend the COVID alert level is moved from level four to level five.

==== 5 January ====
- A further 60,916 new COVID-19 cases are confirmed, the largest daily number so far.
- The UK government says that 1.3 million people in the UK have so far received their first dose of a COVID-19 vaccine. Johnson also promises to provide daily updates on the number of vaccinations administered.
- Chancellor Rishi Sunak announces that businesses affected by the new lockdown will receive grants of up to £9,000 per property.
- GPs have been told to "stand down" routine patient care in favour of COVID vaccination in order to ensure the NHS can deliver 14 million vaccines by February.
- The BBC announces that programming for schools will air on BBC Two and CBBC, as well as online, during lockdown, starting from Monday 11 January.
- YouTube bans Talkradio for allegedly violating its rules by posting information that contradicts expert advice about the COVID-19 pandemic, but reinstates the station within hours.
- With England and Scotland back in lockdown, personal trainer Joe Wicks confirms his plans to restart free online PE lessons on Mondays, Wednesdays and Fridays, starting from 11 January. A few days later, musician Bez of Happy Mondays also subsequently announces plans to launch an online fitness class, from 17 January.
- England's Chief Medical officer, Professor Chris Whitty, suggests "a few" COVID restrictions may be required in Winter 2021–22 to control the virus, particularly if people do not adhere to the government's "stay at home" message.

==== 6 January ====
- A further 62,322 new COVID-19 cases are confirmed, the largest daily number so far, a further 1,041 people have died, the largest daily number since April. The number of people in hospital with COVID also tops 30,000, with 30,074 patients being treated.
- COVID hospital admissions reach 3,967, and begin to decline after this date.
- Fast food retailer McDonald's announces it will pause its walk-in takeaway service during lockdown.
- Annemarie Plas, founder of Clap for Our Carers, announces the weekly event will return from the following day, but under the name Clap for Heroes.
- Fraudsters are sending out fake text messages about the COVID-19 pandemic in an attempt to get hold of people's bank details, it is reported.

==== 7 January ====
- NHS trials of two anti-inflammatory drugs, tocilizumab and sarilumab, have indicated they can cut the number of COVID deaths by a quarter.
- The revived Clap for Heroes initiative is met with a quieter response than its previous run in spring 2020, with founder Annemarie Plas distancing herself from it after receiving online abuse.
- National Express announces the suspension of its entire coach fleet from midnight on 10 January.
- The UK government announces that road haulage drivers crossing the English Channel will continue to need a recent negative COVID test until further notice.
- Prime Minister Boris Johnson announces that the armed forces are to help with the rollout of COVID vaccines, while 1,000 GP surgeries will be able to administer "hundreds of thousands" of vaccines per day by 15 January. 1.5 million vaccine doses have been given so far.

==== 8 January ====
- The Moderna vaccine becomes the third COVID vaccine to be given approval for use in the UK.
- Sadiq Khan, the Mayor of London, declares a "major incident" in London, where he says COVID is "out of control".
- Research from the COVID Symptom Study suggests COVID cases increased by a third in the UK and reached 70,000 new cases a day between 26 December and 3 January, while the Office for National Statistics estimates 1.2 million people had COVID over the same time period.
- The R number is estimated to be between 1.0 and 1.4.
- The UK records its largest number of daily COVID-related deaths so far, with 1,325 new deaths, bringing the total to 79,833. The figure surpasses 21 April 2020, when there were 1.224 deaths. However, average deaths are estimated to be two thirds of the peak in April, suggesting the high daily total may have occurred as a result of a backlog in reporting deaths over the Christmas period.
- An England-wide advertising campaign launches on television, fronted by Chief Medical Officer Chris Whitty, urging people to stay at home and act as though they have COVID.

==== 9 January ====
- A further 1,035 COVID-related deaths take the total past 80,000 to 80,868.
- People travelling from the UK to the Republic of Ireland must produce a negative COVID test before being allowed to enter that country.
- With the exception of British and Irish nationals, travellers from Namibia, Zimbabwe, Angola, Botswana, Mauritius and Seychelles, are banned from entering England because of the South Africa COVID strain.
- Buckingham Palace confirms that Queen Elizabeth and Prince Philip have received COVID vaccinations, which were administered by a royal doctor at Windsor Castle.
- The Hacking Trust, a property investment company, has approached staff at GP surgeries offering to pay £5,000 for unused COVID vaccines. A spokesman for the Institute of General Practice Management describes the story as "just appalling".

==== 10 January ====
- Professor Peter Horby, chair of the government's New and Emerging Respiratory Virus Threats Advisory Group tells the Andrew Marr Show "we are now in the eye of the storm" and "it was bad in March, it's much worse now."
- Health Secretary Matt Hancock tells the BBC that everybody in the top four most vulnerable groups will be offered a vaccine by 15 February, while every adult in the UK will be offered one by the autumn. Hancock also says that the NHS is under "very serious pressure" and warns people that "flexing the rules" could be fatal.
- As the National Police Chiefs' Council issues guidelines telling police officers to issue fines more quickly for breaches of COVID regulations, Home Secretary Priti Patel defends the way police have handled lockdown breaches, and says they "will not hesitate" to enforce the rules.
- Jeremy Brown, Professor of Respiratory Infection at University College London and a member of the Joint Committee on Vaccines and Immunisation, has suggested children may have to stay in isolation until they have been vaccinated.
- Online retailer Ocado warns customers of possible shortages because of the pandemic, with the possibility of "an increase of missing items and substitutions over the next few weeks".

==== 11 January ====
- Sir Simon Stevens, the chief executive of NHS England, has described online videos reported to show empty hospitals as "a lie". The videos, which Stevens says are mostly filmed by people walking through empty hospital corridors, have been used to argue claims the NHS is being overwhelmed by the pandemic are an exaggeration.
- Professor Chris Whitty, England's Chief Medical Officer, says that the UK will go through the "most dangerous time" in the weeks before the deployment of COVID vaccines begin to have an impact.
- Health Secretary Matt Hancock confirms that 2.3 million people have now received a COVID vaccine.
- Chancellor Rishi Sunak warns the economy will "get worse before it gets better".
- Figures released by the British Retail Consortium indicate that retailers experienced their worst year of sales in 2020, with sales down by 0.3% as a result of the COVID-19 pandemic.
- Supermarket retailers Morrisons and Sainsbury's announce their intention to prevent customers who refuse to wear face coverings from entering their premises; Sainsbury's will also challenge people who shop in groups.
- Eye health charity Fight for Sight warns of the damage too much screentime during lockdown could cause to people's eyesight.

==== 12 January ====
- The United Arab Emirates is removed from the UK's quarantine exemption list, requiring anyone travelling from there to self-isolate for ten days.
- Home Secretary Priti Patel urges people to "play [their] part" in following COVID rules, and says she will back the police in enforcing them.
- Tesco, Asda and Waitrose join Morrisons and Sainsbury's in banning customers from their stores who refuse to wear face coverings.

==== 13 January ====
- A further 1,564 COVID related deaths are recorded, the highest daily number so far, which brings the total to 84,767. The deaths are largely spread throughout the preceding week, with some dating back to November 2020.
- The British Medical Association has called for doctors to be supplied with higher grade face masks to protect them against catching COVID-19.
- Plans to introduce requirements for pre-travel COVID testing for travellers entering the UK are postponed from Friday 15 January to Monday 18 January in order to give people time to prepare for the changes.

==== 14 January ====
- The UK announces a travel ban on arrivals from South America, Portugal and Cape Verde over fears of a new variant of COVID from Brazil; the travel ban comes into force from Friday 15 January.
- With fears that COVID cases could overwhelm hospital space, some care homes have said that insurance issues prevent them from taking COVID patients.
- Conservative MP Steve Baker of the COVID Recovery Group warns Prime Minister Boris Johnson he could face a leadership challenge if the government does not ease COVID restrictions.
- The Conservative Party's Northern Research Group urges Chancellor Rishi Sunak to extend financial help packages for families and businesses as the uncertainty over COVID continues.
- As the weekly Clap for Heroes gets under way at 8pm, NHS staff gather outside Downing Street to protest at the government's handling of the COVID crisis.

==== 15 January ====
- The R number is estimated to be between 1.2 and 1.3, a fall on the previous week, with data also suggesting there are signs the number of COVID cases are beginning to fall.
- Prime Minister Boris Johnson announces that the UK will close all travel corridors from Monday 18 January to "protect against the risk of as yet unidentified new Covid strains", and meaning that anyone travelling to the UK will need to provide a negative COVID test before embarking on their journey.
- Following a ruling by the Supreme Court, tens of thousands of small businesses will receive insurance payments covering losses accrued during the first lockdown of March 2020.
- The Independent Press Standards Organisation (IPSO) orders The Daily Telegraph to publish a correction over a "significantly misleading" column written by Toby Young in July 2020, which claimed the common cold can provide "natural immunity" to COVID-19 and London was "probably approaching herd immunity".

==== 16 January ====
- Groups representing medics, including the British Medical Association, have called for legal protection for doctors and nurses who make decisions on treatment during the COVID-19 pandemic.
- Groups representing the UK aviation industry have said it "urgently" needs support if it is to survive losses brought about by the COVID pandemic.
- Epidemiologist Professor Neil Ferguson describes a new Brazilian strain of COVID as a "real cause for concern".
- UK holiday firms forecast a boom in "staycations" during 2021 once COVID restrictions are lifted.
- Figures released by the Child Safeguarding Practice Review Panel have shown that incidents of child abuse increased by a quarter during the first lockdown that began in March 2020.

==== 17 January ====
- Although places of worship are allowed to open for services during the present lockdowns in England and Wales, more than half of the Church of England's 14,000 parishes do not open for Sunday services due to safety concerns.
- The Health and Safety Executive (HSE) expresses its concern about employees being required to go into workplaces that are not COVID-compliant after it received 2,945 complaints about safety issues during the week of 6–14 January.
- Foreign Secretary Dominic Raab tells the BBC a decision on whether to extend the weekly £20 increase in Universal Credit is unlikely before the March budget.
- With 3.5 million COVID vaccines given, 324,000 in the last 24 hours, Health Secretary Matt Hancock says the UK is "nearly on the home straight".
- Nadhim Zahawi, the Minister for Vaccine Deployment, says that the UK is averaging 140 vaccinations a minute. Hancock says that half of those aged 80 and over have received a COVID vaccine.

==== 18 January ====
- The number of people receiving a COVID vaccine exceeds four million.
- The House of Commons votes 278–0 to pass a non-binding motion calling for the government to extend the £20 Universal Credit top up beyond 31 March.
- Figures show that cases of COVID-19 have fallen by a quarter over the preceding week.

==== 19 January ====
- A further 1,610 COVID-related deaths are reported, the largest number reported in a single day, taking the total past 90,000 to 91,470. The figures do not represent the number of deaths on a particular day, but the number recorded by the government on a particular day, and some occurred previously.
- Health data shows that the number of COVID cases has fallen by 26.7% over the preceding week.
- GOV.uk confirms that 4.06 million people have received their first dose of COVID vaccine, with half of those aged over 80 having been vaccinated.
- Figures from the Office for National Statistics suggest that one in ten had been infected with COVID in the period from the beginning of the outbreak up to December 2020.
- Health Secretary Matt Hancock announces he is self-isolating after receiving an alert from NHS COVID-19 telling him he has come into contact with someone who tested positive for COVID-19.
- A number of criminal justice watchdogs have expressed "grave concerns" over the backlog of cases in England and Wales, where 54,000 cases are waiting to be heard. This means cases from 2020 may not be heard until 2022, and there are fears it could damage the justice system for a number of years.

==== 20 January ====
- A further 1,820 deaths are reported of people who died within 28 days of testing positive for COVID-19, the highest daily figure so far, and bringing the total to 93,290. The high number is due to delays in reporting some deaths; at least a quarter of those recorded on this date occurred during the preceding week or earlier.
- A video obtained by the politics website Guido Fawkes shows Home Secretary Priti Patel telling a group of Conservative supporters she was an "advocate" of closing the UK borders in March 2020 as a way of slowing the spread of COVID-19.
- Travel operator Saga announces that anyone going on one of its cruises in 2021 must be vaccinated against COVID-19.

==== 21 January ====
- A further 1,290 deaths are reported within 28 days of testing positive for COVID-19.
- The latest vaccination figures indicate that almost five million people have received their first dose of COVID vaccine.
- At a Downing Street Press Conference, Home Secretary Priti Patel announces that fines of £800 for anyone attending a house party of more than 15 people will be introduced in England from the following week.
- Figures released by the Crown Prosecution Service (CPS) show that a quarter of COVID-related crimes in the first six months of the pandemic were made up of assaults against emergency workers.

==== 22 January ====
- The R number is estimated to be between 0.8 and 1, meaning the epidemic is shrinking, while Office for National Statistics suggest infection levels have either plateaued or are beginning to decline.
- At a Downing Street press conference, Prime Minister Boris Johnson says early evidence suggests the new COVID variant discovered in the UK may have a higher mortality rate, but that there is huge uncertainty over the figures and vaccination is expected to work.
- The release date of the 25th James Bond film, No Time to Die, is delayed for a third time because of the COVID outbreak, and will now debut on 8 October 2021.
- The UK government launches its "Can you look them in the eyes?" ad campaign, featuring doctors, healthcare workers and COVID patients, urging people not to leave home unless for essential reasons.

==== 23 January ====
- After Prime Minister Boris Johnson suggested the new variant of COVID may be associated with higher mortality, scientists have played down his comments, with the co-author of a study cited by Johnson saying the strain's greater deadliness remains an "open question".
- Figures released by the UK government suggest the number of COVID patients on ventilators has passed 4,000 for the first time in the pandemic, with a total of 4,076 on ventilation the previous day.
- The British Medical Association has called for the time between the first and second doses of Pfizer BioNTech vaccine to be halved from twelve to six weeks, describing the twelve week gap as "difficult to justify".
- A total of 6,329,968 doses of COVID vaccine have now been administered, with 5.8 million people having received their first dose. But England's Deputy Chief Medical Officer Jonathan Van Tam urges people to stick with the restrictions amid concerns people who have received the vaccine may stop following them.
- Guernsey enters its second lockdown with immediate effect after four cases of COVID are discovered on the island. The first lockdown was lifted on 11 June 2020 and the island had been free of the virus since then.

==== 24 January ====
- Speaking to Sky News, Health Secretary Matt Hancock says he would hope for schools to be open again by Easter, but whether they do or not will depend on the data.
- Figures show that 491,970 first vaccinations were administered over the most recent 24-hour period, the highest daily figure to date, bringing the total number so far to 6.3 million.
- Figures show that British employers made plans to cut 795,000 jobs during 2020 because of lockdown, but that job losses slowed towards the end of the year.
- Health Secretary Matt Hancock announces that 77 cases of the South African variant of COVID have been identified in the UK.
- The Public and Commercial Services Union urges ministers to act after figures reveal that 500 people at the DVLA in Swansea have contracted COVID-19 since the beginning of the pandemic.

==== 25 January ====
- A further 32 mass vaccination centres are confirmed as opening in the forthcoming week.
- Labour leader Keir Starmer announces he is self isolating after a recent contact tested positive for COVID-19.
- Hays Travel announces the closure of 89 of its 353 shops after business was affected by national restrictions.

==== 26 January ====
- A further 1,631 deaths reported within 28 days of a positive COVID diagnosis take the total number of deaths recorded by the government past 100,000 to 100,162, though figures released by the Office for National Statistics suggest the 100,000 figure was surpassed in the week to 15 January, when the cumulative number reached 104,000.
- England's Chief Medical officer, Professor Chris Whitty, suggests the number of daily deaths is likely to come down "relatively slowly".
- The Opposition Labour Party calls for juries in England and Wales to be cut from twelve members to seven in order to clear the backlog of what it describes as the "gravest crisis" in the legal system since the Second World War.

==== 27 January ====
- Communities Secretary Robert Jenrick says the government would almost certainly have handled the pandemic differently with the benefit of hindsight.
- Prime Minister Boris Johnson tells the House of Commons it will not be possible for schools to return in England after February half-term, but that he is hopeful it can begin to happen from 8 March. A final decision will depend on meeting vaccination targets, and schools will get two weeks notice before returning.
- People travelling to the UK from countries considered to be COVID hotspots will be required to quarantine in government hotels, it is announced, while anyone wishing to travel abroad will need to prove that they are making an essential trip. Policing will also be increased at air and seaports.
- An Office for National Statistics study indicates that coughing, fatigue, a sore throat and muscle pain may be more common in people who test positive for the new UK variant of COVID.
- Ahead of an expected visit to Scotland by Boris Johnson, First Minister of Scotland Nicola Sturgeon suggests he should not make the trip as it is not classed as essential travel.

==== 28 January ====
- After the European Union urges AstraZeneca to supply it with doses of vaccine from UK plants following a row with the EU over supplies, Cabinet Office Minister Michael Gove says there "will be no interruption" to UK vaccine supplies.
- Large scale UK trials of the Novavax vaccine show it to be 89.9% efficient, and also effective against new variants of the virus.
- The United Arab Emirates, Burundi and Rwanda are added to the UK's "red list" of countries from where travel to the UK is banned, and takes effect from 1.00pm on Friday 29 January.
- Public Health England and Prime Minister Boris Johnson give their backing to the Oxford–AstraZeneca vaccine after Germany recommends it should only be given to people aged 65 and under. PHE describes it as offering "high levels of protection" while Johnson says he is not concerned by Germany's comments.
- The UK government withdraws a social media stay home advert because it was deemed to be sexist; the ad shows women home schooling children and doing domestic chores, while the only male featured is seen relaxing on a sofa.
- Figures show that fines for COVID breaches have increased by a third in the latest lockdown.
- A saliva COVID test developed by LampORE has shown promising results in detecting the virus, and could soon be offered to the public.

==== 29 January ====
- Trials of the single-dose Janssen COVID-19 vaccine, of which the UK has ordered 60 million doses, have indicated it to be 66% effective, the Belgian pharmaceutical firm Janssen confirms.
- Office for National Statistics figures have suggested the level of COVID cases remained stable in the week up to 23 January, and may have even fallen slightly.
- The R number is estimated to be between 0.7 and 1.1, but the Scientific Advisory Group for Emergencies (SAGE) warns COVID levels are still "dangerously high".
- Amid an ongoing row over vaccine shortfalls in the European Union, the European Commission announces the introduction of controls on vaccines made in the bloc, including to Northern Ireland. Responding to the announcement, Prime Minister Boris Johnson says the EU must "urgently clarify its intentions", while First Minister Arlene Foster describes the move as "an incredible act of hostility". The Commission later reverses the decision, which overrides the Northern Ireland Protocol element of the Brexit Agreement, and says that Northern Ireland will not be affected.
- ITV postpones the next series of Britain's Got Talent until 2022 amid concerns over safety during the COVID outbreak.

==== 30 January ====
- Prime Minister Boris Johnson writes an open letter praising parents for the way they have coped during the pandemic, telling him he is "in awe" of them.
- Cabinet Office Minister Michael Gove says he is "confident" vaccine supplies and the UK's vaccine programme can continue as planned, and that the EU "made a mistake" by triggering emergency provisions in the Brexit agreement.
- The latest government figures indicate that 8.9 million people have received their first COVID vaccine, with two thirds of those aged 75–79 having received the vaccine, and five out of six of those over 80 having done so.
- Figures published by the Department of Health and Social Care estimate that measures such as lockdown taken to tackle the COVID-19 pandemic could lead to a further 100,000 non-COVID deaths. These deaths could be from missed cancer operations, job losses and people struggling with their mental health during lockdown, the figures suggest.

==== 31 January ====
- This date marks one year since the United Kingdom recorded its first domestic cases of COVID-19.
- The latest figures show that 598,389 people received their first COVID vaccination on 30 January, the highest daily figure so far, bringing the number vaccinated so far to 8,977,329.
- Fundraiser and World War II veteran Captain Sir Tom Moore is admitted to hospital after testing positive for COVID-19.
- Following the COVID vaccine dispute, AstraZeneca agrees to supply the European Union with an extra nine million doses of its vaccine during the first quarter of 2021.

=== February 2021 ===
==== 1 February ====
- Health Secretary Matt Hancock confirms that around 80,000 residents over the age of 16 in areas of Surrey, London, Kent, Hertfordshire, Southport and Walsall are to be asked to take tests for the South African COVID-19 variant after 11 cases were identified that could not be linked to travel.
- Prime Minister Boris Johnson confirms he will outline details for easing restrictions on 22 February, and says he is "optimistic" that people will be able to have summer holidays in 2021. But he warns that although there are signs lockdown is working, it is too early to "take your foot off the throat of the beast" by easing restrictions.
- The government orders an extra 40 million doses of VLA2001, a vaccine from French biotech company Valneva SE, for availability later in the year and into 2022.
- The Isle of Man government lifts lockdown restrictions after the island has 20 days without any COVID cases. Shops, pubs and restaurants are allowed to reopen, while social distancing rules are scrapped. The Isle of Man is the only part of the British Isles to be free of COVID regulations.

==== 2 February ====
- Public Health England says the Kent variant, itself a mutation of COVID-19, has mutated again, and is investigating "worrying" new genetic changes. Tests show cases of the new strain have a mutation called E484K that is present in the South Africa variant.
- The UK has now administered 10 million doses of COVID vaccine, a figure that includes 9.6 million first vaccinations.
- The UK records 16,840 COVID cases, the lowest daily figure since 9 December.
- Captain Sir Tom Moore dies aged 100 after testing positive for COVID-19.
- A study, yet to be published, suggests that a single dose of the Oxford–AstraZeneca vaccine could lead to a "substantial" fall in the spread of COVID, and is 76% effective in the three months before the second dose is given.

==== 3 February ====
- Health Secretary Matt Hancock describes the results of a study into the Oxford–AstraZeneca vaccine as "absolutely superb".
- The team behind the Oxford–AstraZeneca vaccine say a new version capable of tackling COVID variants will be ready in the autumn if required.
- Chief Medical Officer Professor Chris Whitty says the UK is "on a downward slope of cases, hospitalizations and deaths", as the number of people receiving their first COVID vaccination passes 10 million.
- Tributes continue to be paid to Captain Sir Tom Moore; the UK government says his memory will be marked "properly and appropriately", while a national clap is staged for him at 6.00pm.
- Ryanair is ordered to remove a "misleading" advert concerning the COVID-19 vaccine by the Advertising Standards Authority that encouraged people to book flights with the airline, claiming passengers could "Jab & Go". The ASA has received 2,370 complaints about the ads, the third highest number of complaints received by them concerning an ad campaign.

==== 4 February ====
- The National Immunisation Schedule Evaluation Consortium launches a trial to determine whether giving different COVID vaccines for first and second vaccinations could provide better protection, and involves 800 volunteers.
- The Bank of England forecasts that the UK economy will shrink by 4.2% in the first three months of 2021, but then bounce back strongly as a result of society being able to open up again because of the COVID-19 vaccination programme.
- The UK government confirms 15 February as the start date for the hotel quarantine scheme that will require anyone returning from countries on the "red list" to quarantine at a government designated hotel for ten days at their own expense.
- Leading health charities urge the government to extend the extra £20 benefit for Universal Credit claimants beyond 31 March.

==== 5 February ====
- The R number is estimated to be between 0.7 and 1 as figures from the Office for National Statistics show evidence that COVID cases in the UK are falling.
- Health Secretary Matt Hancock announces a target to offer all adults over the age of 50 a first COVID vaccination by May.
- In a conversation with French President Emmanuel Macron, Prime Minister Boris Johnson discusses collaboration between the British and French governments to tackle COVID-19.
- Chancellor Rishi Sunak announces that small businesses will have longer to repay government sponsored loans taken out to protect them against the economic effects of the COVID-19 pandemic. The time period to repay these loans will be extended from six to ten years.
- Elections for local authorities, directly elected mayors and police and crime commissioners in England and Wales are to go ahead as scheduled on 6 May, but voters will be asked to bring their own pens to the polling station.

==== 6 February ====
- Dr Clive Dix, chairman of the UK's Vaccine Taskforce, says he is "very optimistic" that the goal of vaccinating all people over the age of 50 can be achieved by May.

==== 7 February ====
- The number of people receiving their first COVID vaccination passes 12 million.
- The UK government rules out the idea of issuing a vaccine passport for people who have been vaccinated after the Greek Prime Minister said his country would welcome British holidaymakers who have been vaccinated.
- A new study involving 2,000 people, and yet to be peer-reviewed, suggests the Oxford–AstraZeneca vaccine offers "minimal protection" against the South African COVID variant but does protect against severe disease. In response to these results, Professor Sarah Gilbert, Oxford lead vaccine developer, says a modified version of the vaccine capable of tackling the South African variant should be ready by the autumn.
- Lord Falconer, the Shadow Attorney General, apologises after a Mail on Sunday article reported that he described the COVID-19 pandemic as a "gift that keeps on giving" for lawyers during an online law conference in June 2020.

==== 8 February ====
- Prime Minister Boris Johnson says he is "very confident" in the Oxford–AstraZeneca vaccine's use in the UK following concerns about its effectiveness against the South African COVID variant.

==== 9 February ====
- Health Secretary Matt Hancock announces that people required to quarantine in government authorised hotels from 15 February will be required to pay £1,750 for a ten-day stay. The quarantine applies to anyone returning from the countries on the government's "red list", with anyone failing to quarantine at a hotel facing a fine of £10,000. Travellers who arrive in England and attempt to conceal their visit to a red list country by lying on their passport locator form will face a £10,000 fine and up to ten years in prison. All travellers arriving by air into Scotland will be required to quarantine at a hotel for ten days.
- Figures relating to the NHS COVID-19 app show it has asked 1.7 million people in England and Wales to self-isolate since its launch.
- A report from the Women and Equalities Committee says that government policy throughout the pandemic has "repeatedly skewed towards men" and makes a number of suggestions to redress the balance.
- Online retailer Ocado has suggested that supermarket shopping has changed "for good" after a year in which many people were forced to shop online for the first time because of the pandemic.

==== 10 February ====
- The latest vaccination figures show that 13,058,298 people have received their first COVID vaccine; Prime Minister Boris Johnson urges the two million people in the first four priority groups yet to be vaccinated to "come forward" in the coming week.
- Transport Secretary Grant Shapps urges people not to book holidays in the UK or overseas because of COVID, saying the government does not know "where we'll be" in the summer.
- A survey of 1,500 care services suggests vaccination of care staff is lagging behind the target, with at least half of facilities having at least 30% of their staff still unvaccinated.
- Elton John and Michael Caine have both featured in an ad campaign to encourage people to be vaccinated against COVID-19.
- Jonathan Van-Tam, England's Deputy Chief Medical Officer, has expressed concern that uptake of COVID vaccination may not be "as rapid or as high" among ethnic minority communities.
- The World Health Organization has recommended use of the Oxford–AstraZeneca vaccine for all adults, even in countries where new variants of the virus are prevalent.

==== 11 February ====
- New research shows the benefits of using tocilizumab, a drug used to treat arthritis, on hospital patients with COVID, with an extra life saved for every 25 patients given the drug.
- Health Secretary Matt Hancock reiterates comments that have been made about summer holidays by other officials, saying it is "too early" to know if they can go ahead.

==== 12 February ====
- Figures from the Office for National Statistics show the UK economy shrank by 9.9% in 2020, the largest economic contraction on record. But the UK is likely to avoid a double dip recession because of economic growth at the end of the year.
- The latest R number is estimated to be between 0.7 and 0.9, while figures from the Office for National Statistics show COVID cases falling in every part of the UK.
- The Jersey Government announces that pubs and restaurants can reopen from 22 February, but for table service only.

==== 13 February ====
- Research is to be carried out into the effectiveness of the Oxford–AstraZeneca vaccine on children.
- The leaders of the Parliamentary COVID Recovery Group have written to Prime Minister Boris Johnson urging him to lift all COVID restrictions in England by the end of April.

==== 14 February ====
- Foreign Secretary Dominic Raab rejects calls by the COVID Recovery Group to give a date for when restrictions will be eased.
- The UK reaches the target of vaccinating 15 million people before 15 February, something Prime Minister Boris Johnson describes as a "significant milestone".
- Online food delivery company Deliveroo and around 300 restaurant outlets have urged the government to run the "Eat Out to Help Out" scheme once restaurants are allowed to reopen.
- The latest daily figures show that 10,972 COVID cases have been recorded in the most recent 24 hours, the lowest number since 2 October 2020.

==== 15 February ====
- British and Irish citizens arriving in the UK after 4.00am are required to quarantine at a government designated hotel for ten days.
- At a Downing Street press conference, Prime Minister Boris Johnson describes the achievement of the vaccination target as an "unprecedented national achievement", but urges people to be "optimistic but patient" over the COVID situation, and that he would like the present lockdown to be the last, saying the exit from it should be "cautious but irriversable".
- A father and daughter who became the first travellers to go into Scotland's quarantine programme after arriving from the United States have been told they can leave quarantine because of a loophole triggered after they stopped at Dublin during their journey, and thus meant they had arrived in Scotland from a country in the Common Travel Area that negates the need for them to quarantine. In response, Health Secretary Matt Hancock says he is happy to discuss measures that would close the loophole.
- At a High Court hearing, the Good Law Project challenges the government's decision to hire Public First, a polling firm with links to former Downing Street special adviser Dominic Cummings for polling about COVID-19.

==== 16 February ====
- An additional 1.7M people in England are advised to shield, and shielding is extended until the end of March. This is a surprise to many as it wasn't mentioned in the previous evening's Downing Street press conference.
- Researchers at the University of Edinburgh identify 38 cases of a new strain of COVID-19 that is similar to the South African variant.

==== 17 February ====
- The UK is to pioneer the first "human challenge" study involving COVID, in which healthy young volunteers will be infected with the virus to test vaccines and treatments.
- Researchers from King's College London and the COVID Symptom Study have urged the government to add fatigue, headache, sore throat and diarrhoea to the list of COVID symptoms, arguing it would help to detect 40% more cases.

==== 18 February ====
- Imperial College London's React study has indicated COVID-19 infections in England have fallen by two-thirds since January, with an 80% drop in London.
- Justice Secretary Robert Buckland has said it may be legal for companies to insist on new staff being vaccinated as a condition of their employment, but that it is unlikely existing employees could be forced to have a vaccination by their bosses.
- University application figures show a 32% increase in the number of students applying to study nursing.
- Commercial television stations in the UK air a short film featuring celebrities urging people from ethnic communities to get vaccinated. Those appearing in the film include Sanjeev Bhaskar, Meera Syal and Romesh Ranganathan.

==== 19 February ====
- Prime Minister Boris Johnson chairs a virtual G7 summit in which member countries agree to provide an extra £5bn funding to help accelerate the distribution of COVID-19 vaccines to the world's poorest countries.
- The High Court rules that Health Secretary Matt Hancock "breached his legal obligations" by failing to reveal details of contracts signed by the Department of Health and Social Care during the pandemic.
- Figures from the Office for National Statistics show that COVID rates continued to fall in the week ending 12 February.
- The R number is estimated to be between 0.6 and 0.9, a slight fall on the previous week's figures.

==== 20 February ====
- As the number of people receiving their first COVID vaccine reaches 17 million, Prime Minister Boris Johnson announces he wants the programme to "go further and faster" by offering every adult in the UK their first injection by 31 July.
- John Vincent, the co-founder of Leon Restaurants, has suggested that further extending lockdown will "cost lives" because businesses are losing money that should be going to their employees and to the government in taxes, both of which help to fuel the economy.

==== 21 February ====
- Figures published by the Insolvency Service suggest 250 companies made plans to make a total of 32,000 people redundant in January 2021, the lowest monthly figures since the beginning of the pandemic, and a rise of 9% in January 2020.
- Health Secretary Matt Hancock says there is "early data" to suggest transmission of the virus is much lower among people who have been vaccinated, and that hospital admissions are falling "much more sharply" than during spring 2020. He also confirms that one in three adults have now received their first COVID vaccination.
- Matt Hancock tells the BBC the delay in publishing details of contracts was "the right thing to do" because his team were focused on sourcing PPE equipment.
- The Medicines and Healthcare products Regulatory Agency launches an investigation into Hinpack, a firm with no history of manufacturing medical products that was awarded a £30m contract to manufacture vials for COVID testing during the pandemic, and whose owner ran a pub near Matt Hancock's constituency.

==== 22 February ====
- Research into the UK's vaccination programme suggests it is having a "significant" impact in reducing serious illness from COVID, with a single dose of vaccine reducing the risk of illness by three quarters in those over the age of 80.
- Prime Minister Boris Johnson unveils a four-step plan for ending COVID-19 restrictions in England by 21 June. Subject to four tests on vaccines, infection rates and new variants being met, the plan will include the following:
  - Schools and colleges will reopen on 8 March, with outdoor schools activities allowed; universities will return at a later time:
  - Outdoor gatherings of up to six people or two households will resume from 29 March, along with grassroots sports:
  - Non-essential shops, hairdressers, gyms and outdoor hospitality will resume on 12 April:
  - Two households will be able to mix indoors, with the rule of six applying to pub settings from 17 May:
  - Legal limits on social contact to be lifted by 21 June:
- Speaking in the House of Commons, Johnson describes the plan as "cautious but irreversible" and something that will be led by "data not dates", further adding that there is "no credible route to a zero-Covid Britain nor indeed a zero-Covid world".
- Following Johnson's announcement, airlines report a surge in holiday bookings.

==== 23 February ====
- Health Secretary Matt Hancock tells Sky News that plans to ease COVID-19 could be slower than those outlined by the Prime Minister depending on infection rates.
- First Minister of Scotland Nicola Sturgeon unveils the Scottish Government's strategy for reopening the economy in Scotland. The plan includes the following:
  - All primary pupils, and senior pupils from Years S5 and S6 to return to the classroom on 15 March, but other secondary pupils may not return to school until after Easter. Also on 15 March, four people from two separate households to be allowed to meet up outdoors.
  - Scotland's stay at home restrictions could be lifted on 5 April.
  - The reopening of non-essential retail, restaurants, pubs, gyms and hairdressers is expected to start from 26 April.
- Prime Minister Boris Johnson announces a review into the idea of vaccine passports to allow people to go on holiday and into venues, describing the proposal as having "deep and complex issues".
- The Department of Health and Social Care confirms a million high grade masks used for the National Health Service have been withdrawn from use because they do not meet the right safety standards.

==== 24 February ====
- The number of people to receive their first COVID vaccine reaches 18 million.
- A new government advertising campaign is launched urging people to "keep going" and maintain social distancing and other COVID-secure behaviour.
- The Joint Committee on Vaccination and Immunisation has advised that everyone on the GP Learning Disability Register should be prioritised for COVID vaccination.
- The organisers of the Reading and Leeds Festivals say they are "confident" the event can go ahead in 2021 following the announcement of the easing of lockdown restrictions in England.
- Professor Stephen Powis, the National Clinical Director of NHS England warns people against following COVID treatment advice from celebrities such as Gwyneth Paltrow, who wrote about a treatment she claimed she said had been recommended to her for Long COVID, Povis says they are "really not the solutions we'd recommend".

==== 25 February ====
- The UK's COVID alert level is lowered from five to four as the threat of the virus overwhelming the NHS has "receded".
- Queen Elizabeth II takes part in a video call with health leaders helping to deliver the vaccine during which she urges people to get the vaccine when it is offered to them.

==== 26 February ====
- The vaccine priority list for adults aged under 50 is announced, with people aged 40–49 the next group to receive a vaccination. But no occupations will be prioritised, despite campaigns by police officers and teachers for priority.
- The latest figures from the Office for National Statistics suggest rates of COVID cases are continuing to fall, but England's Deputy Chief Medical Officer, Jonathan Van-Tam, warns some areas are "burning quite hot". Areas bucking the trend include parts of the Midlands, areas of the East and West Coast of England, and parts of Scotland and Northern Ireland, although these figures are not as high as in autumn 2020.
- The R number remains below 1, with estimates of it being between 0.6 and 0.9.

==== 27 February ====
- The funeral is held of Captain Sir Tom Moore, who died aged 100 earlier in the month.
- The latest government figures show that 19.6 million people had received their first COVID-19 vaccination as of 26 February, with 768,810 having received their second.
- As the UK enjoys a weekend of good weather and high temperatures, people descend on beaches and parks despite lockdown restrictions.

==== 28 February ====
- Health Secretary Matt Hancock confirms the number of people receiving a first COVID vaccine has passed 20 million.
- Six cases of the Brazilian variant COVID have been detected in the UK, three in England and three in Scotland.
- Following a weekend of good weather during which people gathered on beaches and in parks SAGE adviser Professor Calum Semple warns "we could blow it by breaking the rules now" if people do not adhere to COVID rules.
- Research carried out by financial consultants LCP finds that lockdown has created six million unintentional savers in the UK among people who have kept their jobs but had fewer overheads on expenses such as travel, meals out and holidays.

=== March 2021 ===
==== 1 March ====
- Data published by Public Health England indicates that a single shot of either the Oxford–AstraZeneca vaccine or Pfizer–BioNTech vaccine reduces the chance of needing hospital treatment in older adults by more than 80%.
- After six cases of the Brazilian COVID variant were discovered in the UK, Prime Minister Boris Johnson defends the government's decision over border measures to prevent new variants of COVID entering the UK. Health Secretary Matt Hancock also rejects criticism that delays to imposing a hotel quarantine system in the UK has put lives at risk.
- One of the people who tested positive for Brazilian variant COVID remains unidentified after they failed to provide their contact details when completing the test; Hancock urges the person to come forward.
- A Public Health England/Office for National Statistics/London School of Hygiene and Tropical Medicine study has suggested teaching staff are not at any greater risk of infection than other people under the age of 65.
- Organisers of the 2021 Download Festival, scheduled to take place from 4–6 June, confirm the event has been cancelled for the second year in a row because of the COVID-19 pandemic.
- Speaking to the House of Commons Joint Committee on the National Security Strategy, former Prime Minister David Cameron describes COVID as the "greatest difficulty" to face a UK government for fifty years, and says that mistakes were made by his government in preparing for such an eventuality.

==== 2 March ====
- On the eve of the budget, Business Secretary Kwasi Kwarteng confirms the furlough scheme and VAT relief for hospitality businesses will continue "while lockdown persists". It is subsequently confirmed the furlough scheme will run until the end of September 2021.
- Northern Ireland unveils what Deputy First Minister Michelle O'Neill describes as a "hopeful and cautious" exit strategy from lockdown, but unlike England and Scotland there is timetable for lifting the measures. Instead ministers will meet each week to assess the information available to them and decide which restrictions can be lifted. First Minister Arlene Foster acknowledges the frustration felt by people but says the Northern Ireland Executive has learnt a lot about the virus over the past year.
- The unidentified case of Brazilian variant COVID has been narrowed down to 379 households in South East England, all of which are being contacted by authorities.
- Twitter announces it will ban users who repeatedly share misinformation about the COVID-19 pandemic.
- Prime Minister Boris Johnson offers to hold all Euro 2020 matches in the UK. The tournament, postponed because of COVID, is scheduled to take place across twelve countries with the UK hosting the semi-finals and finals.
- Howard Quayle, Chief Minister of the Isle of Man, announces a 21-day "circuit breaker" lockdown for the island following an increase in COVID cases there. The outbreak stems from a ferry worker with the virus.

==== 3 March ====
- Chancellor Rishi Sunak delivers his second budget in which he predicts a "swifter and more sustained" economic recovery after figures from the Office for Budget Responsibility forecast the economy to grow by 4% in 2021 and 7.3% in 2022, bringing it back to its pre-pandemic size by mid-2022. Sunak also says that repairing the long-term damage to the economy "will take time", and pledges to "protect the jobs and livelihoods of the British people". Measures announced include:
  - An extension to the furlough scheme until the end of September 2021.
  - A six-month extension of the £20 Universal Credit top-up.
  - No change to the rates of income tax, but an increase in corporation tax from 19% to 25% from April 2023.
  - A three-month extension to the business rates holiday, taking it to the end of June 2021.
  - A three-month extension to the stamp duty holiday until the end of June 2021.
  - An increase on the contactless payment limit from £45 to £100 later in 2021.
- Essex based charity Kids Inspire reports that children are experiencing "heightened anxieties" because of lockdown, with some as young as three refusing to eat and frightened to leave home.
- London lady Sarah Everard is murdered by a corrupt cop, Wayne Couzens under the pretext of Covid laws. Wayne is later arrested and sentenced to life in jail.

==== 4 March ====
- The Medicines and Healthcare products Regulatory Agency issues guidelines allowing fast-tracked approval for new versions of existing COVID-19 vaccines developed to fight variants, similar to the existing rules for annual flu vaccines.
- Public Health England has added a new COVID variant to its watchlist after 16 cases were identified of a strain with similarities to the South African and Brazilian variants.
- Security services confirm that three terror plots against UK targets have been foiled since the start of the pandemic.
- A report into the NHS Test and Trace app shows that data from pub, restaurant and hairdresser QR codes was "barely used", creating the possibility that thousands of people were not warned they were at potential risk of being infected with COVID-19.
- David Ashford, the Isle of Man's Health Minister, announces that all adults on the island will receive their first COVID vaccination by the end of May. An increase in vaccine deliveries means it will shortly be possible to administer up to 1,000 vaccinations per day.
- The Big Festival, cancelled in 2020 due to COVID-19, is confirmed for 27–29 August.

==== 5 March ====
- Cyprus says it will open its borders to UK citizens who have received a COVID vaccination from the start of May.
- The Good Law Project says that the details of many COVID contracts remain unpublished, even though Prime Minister Boris Johnson has said they are "on the record for everyone to see".
- The latest Office for National Statistics figures for the week up to 27 February indicate COVID cases across the UK have fallen by a third, with 280,000 people with the virus, and it has also fallen in those aged over 70.
- The R number is estimated to be between 0.7 and 0.9, a slight rise on the previous week, but below 1 meaning the epidemic is still shrinking.
- A mystery person infected with Brazilian variant COVID has been traced to Croydon.
- Following criticism from unions of a 1% pay rise for NHS staff announced in the 2021 budget, Health Secretary Matt Hancock describes the increase as "what we think is affordable".

==== 6 March ====
- The Royal College of Nursing urges the government to reconsider its 1% pay rise for nurses, suggesting many may leave the profession when the pandemic is over if they do not.

==== 7 March ====
- Prime Minister Boris Johnson reiterates the government's stance on the 1% pay rise for NHS staff, describing it as "as much as we can" afford in "tough times".
- Scottish football club Rangers win the league for the first time in 10 years which leads to mass gatherings of up to 19,000 in Glasgow, these gatherings were out of Police and the club's control and have been condemned by the club and the First Minister Nicola Sturgeon.
- A demonstration against the pay rise takes place in Manchester, and is attended by 40 people; the organiser is fined £10,000 as public gatherings remain illegal.
- Dr Susan Hopkins of Public Health England warns the UK should be prepared for a "hard winter" of flu and other non-COVID respiratory illnesses because immunity to them will be lower than in previous winters.
- The latest figures indicate 22.2 million people have now received their first COVID-19 vaccine.
- 82 deaths are recorded in the UK, the first time the daily death rate has been below 100 since 9 October 2020.
- The number of COVID cases on the Isle of Man rises by 81 to 315.

==== 8 March ====
- The number of COVID-related deaths dips below 100 for a second consecutive day, with 65 deaths recorded in the most recent 24-hour period.
- The network of NHS Nightingale hospitals in England are to close from April, it is announced, with the hospitals in London and Sunderland remaining open as vaccination centres.
- A further 56 COVID cases are recorded on the Isle of Man, taking the total to 369; eight people are being treated at the island's Noble's Hospital, one is in intensive care.
- Primary and secondary schools reopen in England

==== 9 March ====
- A fresh row erupts between the UK and European Union after Charles Michel, President of the European Council, incorrectly claims the UK has placed an "outright ban" on exports of COVID vaccines produced in the UK.
- Appearing before the Science and Technology Select Committee, Professor Chris Whitty warns that reopening society too quickly could lead to a substantial surge in the number of COVID cases and place those not yet vaccinated at risk of illness and death.

==== 10 March ====
- Speaking at Prime Minister's Questions in response to comments made by European Commission President Charles Michel, Prime Minister Boris Johnson says the UK government has "not blocked" any sales of COVID vaccines to other countries.
- After a number of countries, including Greece, Portugal and Cyprus, say they hope to welcome British tourists from mid-May, Transport Secretary Grant Shapps tells people it is still too early to think about booking summer holidays abroad.
- Data from the Office for National Statistics suggests women have felt more overworked, anxious and depressed than men during the pandemic.
- A report published by the House of Commons Public Accounts Committee criticises the NHS Test and Trace scheme, saying there is "no clear evidence" it has reduced COVID rates, and failed to prevent lockdowns.
- Concern is expressed by Emma Gilthorpe, chief operating officer at Heathrow Airport, about the length of time passengers are having to wait at border control, with waits of three or even six hours a regular occurrence.

==== 11 March ====
- A further four cases of the Brazilian variant COVID are found in the UK, three in South Gloucestershire and one in Bradford. All are linked to previous cases identified in the UK.
- Staff at the DVLA in Swansea vote to take industrial action over concerns about COVID safety after more than 500 cases at the Agency.
- Scientists at UK Biobank begin a study to determine the long term effects of COVID-19.
- Richard Sheriff of the Association of School and College Leaders warns about parents with "pointy elbows and lawyer friends" who have been emailing teachers to lobby for higher GCSE and A Level grades for their children.
- France announces the easing of travel restrictions from seven countries outside the EU, including the UK.
- The Medicines and Healthcare products Regulatory Agency issues a statement saying there is no evidence linking the Oxford–AstraZeneca vaccine to an increased risk of blood clots, and urges people to continue being vaccinated. The statement comes after some countries, including Norway and Denmark, suspended use of the vaccine amid claims a small number of people given the vaccine had developed blood clots.

==== 12 March ====
- Office for National Statistics data for the week ending 6 March suggests COVID-19 infections continue to fall in England and Wales, but not in Northern Ireland and Scotland.
- The R number is estimated to be between 0.6 and 0.8, and at its lowest since recording of the figure began in May 2020.
- Prime Minister Boris Johnson urges members of the public not to attend vigils for the death of London woman Sarah Everard planned for the following day, warning they are in breach of COVID-19 restrictions.
- The UK Government agrees to deploy 100 military medical personnel to Northern Ireland to help with the accelerated rollout of the vaccine there.
- Students at the University of Manchester hold a vote of no confidence on Vice-Chancellor Nancy Rothwell's leadership of the university over the response to the COVID-19 pandemic; the vote passed with 89% in favour.

==== 13 March ====
- Although the Clapham Common vigil to remember recently deceased London woman Sarah Everard is officially cancelled, a number of women still gather there. The Metropolitan Police are subsequently criticised for the way the event is policed after a video of women being handcuffed and led away by officers is posted on social media. Home Secretary Priti Patel calls the footage "upsetting" and says she has asked the Met for a "full report on what happened".
- Data produced by accountants PricewaterhouseCoopers indicates that 17,500 retail outlets closed in the UK during 2020, but the company says the impact of the COVID-19 pandemic on the high street is yet to be felt.
- The 2021 FA Cup Final and 2021 World Snooker Championship are reported to be among events where the return of large crowds of spectators will be piloted, the FA Cup potentially having 20,000 spectators.

==== 14 March ====
- Health charities are urging around two million people with underlying health condition yet to be vaccinated to book their COVID vaccination. Those in the vulnerable category include people with underlying health conditions such as diabetes, cancer and heart disease. The Department of Health and Social Care says around half of the seven million people who fall into this category have received their first vaccination.
- British Airways outlines plans to make it easier for passengers who have been vaccinated to travel by allowing them to register their status with the BA App if they have received both vaccinations.
- The current outbreak of COVID-19 cases on the Isle of Man reaches 818, with 500 in the preceding week; 16 people are being treated at the island's Noble's Hospital.

==== 15 March ====
- The World Health Organization (WHO) says there is no evidence linking the Oxford–AstraZeneca vaccine to blood clots after Germany, France, Italy and Spain join other European Union countries in pausing their use of the vaccine; the WHO urges continued use of the vaccine.
- A large shipment of the Oxford vaccine from the Serum Institute in India means it will be possible to accelerate the UK's vaccination programme in the coming days, with an estimated four million vaccinations being deployed over the next week.
- The Department for Transport removes Portugal from the "red list" of countries to and from travel is banned as of 4am on Friday 19 March.
- Hundreds of people join a fresh vigil in memory of Sarah Everard held in Parliament Square despite a warning from Home Secretary Priti Patel against doing so. Patel also announces a review into the policing of the event at Clapham Common.
- A BBC News report claims that senior Cabinet Ministers and Officials are critical of Prime Minister Boris Johnson for not bringing in tougher COVID restrictions in Autumn 2020 that they say would have prevented more deaths.
- The Office for National Statistics has added items such as hand sanitiser, loungewear and dumbbells (which became popular during lockdown) to the items used to calculate the cost of living in the UK.

==== 16 March ====
- The European Medicines Agency says it remains "firmly convinced" that the benefits of the Oxford–AstraZeneca vaccine far outweigh the risks.
- With 13 European countries having paused use of the Oxford–AstraZeneca vaccine, Health Secretary Matt Hancock has stressed that the vaccine is safe and urged people to "listen to the regulators" and to "get the jab"

==== 17 March ====
- The latest figures show that 24 million people – almost half the UK's adult population – have received their first COVID-19 vaccine, with 1.6 million having received their second.
- Giving evidence to the Science and Technology Committee, Dominic Cummings, the former aide to the Prime Minister, criticises the Department of Health and Social Care as being "a smoking ruin in terms of procurement and PPE" at the start of the pandemic.
- European Commission Ursula von der Leyen threatens to withhold vaccines exports to the UK and any other non-EU countries that do not supply doses in a reciprocal manner.

==== 18 March ====
- Germany, France, Italy and Spain restart use of the Oxford–AstraZeneca vaccine after a review of its use by the European Medicines Agency declared it to be "safe and effective".
- Health Secretary Matt Hancock confirms that reduced vaccine supplies will not affect people getting their second dose, or the roadmap out of lockdown as Britain is on target to meet its vaccination target.
- Prime Minister Boris Johnson echoes the comments of the European Medicines Agency that the Oxford vaccine is safe, and adds that he will be getting his vaccine the following day.
- The Bank of England says the outlook for the UK economy remains "unusually uncertain" despite the successful deployment of the vaccine.
- Figures have indicated that the predicted pandemic baby boom has not happened, and instead the opposite has occurred.

==== 19 March ====
- Prime Minister Boris Johnson confirms he has received his first COVID vaccination, and that he "did not feel a thing".
- Vaccination figures for the previous day show that a total of 660,276 vaccines were given, the highest daily number so far, and higher than the 609,010 given on 30 January.
- Figures show that excess mortality in those aged 65 and over was 7.7% higher than average during winter 2020–21, but Britain no longer has the highest COVID mortality rate in Europe.
- The R number rises slightly from the previous week to between 0.6 and 0.9, but figures show the epidemic continues to shrink, by between 3% and 6% each day.
- The Queen and Duchess of Cornwall take part in a video call with members of the Royal Voluntary Service to thank them for taking part in the NHS Volunteer Responders Scheme.
- Although the Glastonbury Festival is cancelled for 2021, its organisers confirm they have applied for permission to hold two nights of concerts at the venue in September.
- Figures show the government borrowed £19.1bn in February 2021, the highest monthly figure since records began in 1993.

==== 20 March ====
- A total of 26,853,407 people, or half the UK's adult population, have now received their first COVID vaccine, with another record day for 19 March, when a combined 711,156 first and second doses were given.
- Dr Mike Tildesley, a government scientific adviser, has said that summer holidays overseas are "extremely unlikely" during 2021 because of the risk of people bringing back COVID variants.

==== 21 March ====
- A third day of record vaccination numbers is reported, with a total of 844,285 doses administered on 20 March; 27.6 million people have now received a first vaccination.
- Speaking to the BBC, Defence Secretary Ben Wallace says the government cannot rule out an extension to the ban on foreign holidays.
- Leading epidemiologist Mary Ramsay, who is head of immunisation at Public Health England, has suggested measures such as wearing face coverings and socially distancing may have to be in place for several years until other countries have successfully vaccinated their populations.

==== 22 March ====
- The number of recorded daily COVID deaths rises by 17 to 126,172, the lowest daily rise since 28 September 2020, when 13 deaths were recorded.
- Prime Minister Boris Johnson warns the effects of a COVID resurgence in Europe will "wash up on our shores".
- COVID restrictions are lifted in Guernsey and Herm for the second time in the pandemic, with businesses allowed to reopen and social distancing and the wearing of face coverings no longer required.

==== 23 March ====
- The UK marks the anniversary of the day the UK's first lockdown was announced; events to remember the occasion include a minute's silence at midday and a doorstep "beacon of hope" at 8pm during which people are encouraged to stand on their doorsteps and shine torches, candles or mobile phones to pay homage to those who have died. Prime Minister Boris Johnson says that a permanent memorial to those who have died from COVID will be established "at the right moment".
- Figures show the number of people on payrolls in UK companies increased by 200,000 in the three months to February 2021, suggesting the employment market is stabilizing, but the figure is still 693,000 lower than in February 2020.
- Cineworld announces plans to reopen its UK cinemas in May, with a deal that will see films shown in cinemas before they are streamed.
- During a Zoom meeting with backbench Conservative Party MPs, Johnson attributes the success of the UK's vaccination programme to "capitalism" and "greed", then immediately withdraws the remarks.

==== 24 March ====
- Following several weeks of disagreement between the UK and European Union over vaccine supplies, the two sides agree to work together to "create a win-win situation and expand vaccine supply for all"
- Data shows that an unprecedented 2,300 COVID patients have been moved between hospitals due to a shortage of intensive care beds between September 2020 and March 2021, including two that were moved more than 300 miles.

==== 25 March ====
- Prime Minister Boris Johnson says no decision has been made regarding the idea of vaccine passports, but that there will be an update in April. He also suggests it may not be possible to introduce such a scheme until every adult in the UK has been offered a vaccine.
- MPs vote 484–76 to extend the emergency powers contained in the COVID-19 Act 2020 for a further six months, with ministers saying the powers will remain in place "only as long as necessary".

==== 26 March ====
- Following a summit the previous day, the European Union stops short of banning vaccine exports, but instead issues a statement emphasising the importance of global supply chains.
- Tension continues over vaccine supplies, as France accuses the UK of "blackmail" over its handling of vaccine supports.
- Figures from the Office for National Statistics indicate COVID cases have levelled out in the UK for the week ending 20 March, but there was a slight uptick in cases in English secondary schools.
- The R number is believed to be between 0.7 and 0.9, a slight rise on the previous week.
- Organisers of Crufts have cancelled the 2021 event amid "ongoing uncertainty" the first cancellation since the 1954 electricians' strike.

==== 27 March ====
- Addressing the Conservative Party's virtual spring forum, Prime Minister Boris Johnson has said that despite a surge of COVID cases in Europe, there is nothing the UK's data to dissuade him "from continuing along our roadmap to freedom".
- Stephen Reicher, a professor in social psychology at the University of St Andrews, warns that introducing a vaccine passport scheme to encourage younger people to take up the vaccine could prove to be "counterproductive" by creating "other problems like social division and social apartheid" that could "destroy any sense of community that has been so positive in the pandemic".

==== 28 March ====
- The latest figures show that 30,151,287 people have received their first COVID vaccination, with 3,527,481 having received their second.
- Culture Secretary Oliver Dowden says the government's plans to ease lockdown measures are on track and the "last thing in the world" it wants is another lockdown, but that dates "could be delayed if the situation deteriorates".
- A Sunday Times article reports that the UK government is preparing to offer 3.7 million vaccines to the Republic of Ireland in what is described as something that would address "genuine public health concerns in Northern Ireland", Arlene Foster, the First Minister of Northern Ireland, says that the idea is a "runner" and one she suggested to Prime Minister Boris Johnson. The UK government says it does not currently have a vaccine surplus.

==== 29 March ====
- The stay at home order for England comes to an end, as two households or six people are allowed to meet up outside. Weddings with up to six people are also permitted again. Prime Minister Boris Johnson urges people to be cautions as COVID remains a threat.
- A BBC Panorama investigation at one of the UK's largest COVID testing laboratories uncovers the potential for inaccuracies, with discarded tests, the risk of contamination of tests and pressure on staff to meet targets.
- The UK's vaccines committee recommends that people living in a household where someone has a weakened immune system should receive priority for COVID vaccination.
- The Office for National Statistics has found the location, wealth and education of people explains only a fraction of the difference in vaccination levels between different ethnic groups.
- A deal has been agreed with GlaxoSmithKline to manufacture 60 million doses of the Novavax vaccine in the UK, at Barnard Castle.
- First Minister of Northern Ireland Arlene Foster says that all adults in the UK will be offered two doses of COVID vaccine before surplus supplies are offered to the Republic of Ireland.
- A new advertising campaign is launched reminding people not to meet up indoors.

==== 30 March ====
- Tests conducted by the Office for National Statistics indicate that roughly half the UK population has COVID-19 antibodies, either through infection or vaccination.
- A group of the UK's leading retailers has called for the Chancellor to introduce a "Shop Out to Help Out" scheme similar to the August 2020 "Eat Out to Help Out" scheme introduced to help the restaurant sector.

==== 31 March ====
- Queen Elizabeth II makes her first public appearance of 2021 outside Windsor Castle at a ceremony to mark the centenary of the Royal Australian Air Force.
- People are urged to exercise caution following two days of extremely warm weather that have coincided with the easing of lockdown restrictions in England, and resulted in people descending on parks and beaches.
- Dame Cressida Dick, Commissioner of the Metropolitan Police, says that critics of the way the Clapham Common vigil for Sarah Everard was policed spoke out "without knowing the facts".
- Although Glastonbury 2021 has been cancelled, organisers of the festival announce a five-hour livestream from Worthy Farm that will take place on 22 May.

=== April 2021 ===
==== 1 April ====
- A study of the test and trace system published in the British Medical Journal indicates that fewer than one in five people with COVID symptoms orders a COVID test, while those who comply fully with self-isolation rules is also low. The study is based on 74,697 responses to an online survey.
- An Office for National Statistics survey suggests one in five people have Long COVID symptoms five weeks after an initial infection, while one in seven still have it after twelve weeks.
- Sir Simon Stevens, Chief Executive of NHS England, suggests the formation of the NHS after World War II should act as a template for the way healthcare is delivered after the pandemic.
- The four million people in England and Wales told to shield by their GPs are no longer required to do so from this date.

==== 2 April ====
- After The Daily Telegraph reports that COVID passports are to be trialled at a series of venues to test their use, a group of more than 70 MPs from across the political spectrum voice their opposition to the idea, describing it as "dangerous, discriminatory and counterproductive". In response the UK government says no decisions have been made as regards the idea.
- The Medicines and Healthcare products Regulatory Agency says it has found 30 cases of rare blood clots that developed in people after they had the Oxford–AstraZeneca vaccine, but that the benefits of the vaccine outweigh the risks.
- The Scientific Advisory Group for Emergencies (SAGE) is unable to calculate a UK-wide R number but estimates England's rate to be between 0.8 and 1.0, the same as the previous week's value for England.
- As the number of daily COVID cases increases by 3,402, the lowest figure since September 2020, and the Easter Bank Holiday weekend begins, Prime Minister Boris Johnson warns people not to socialise indoors if they have been vaccinating.

==== 3 April ====
- The Medicines and Healthcare Products Regulatory Agency confirms seven blood clot deaths among the 18 million people who have been vaccinated with the Oxford–AstraZeneca vaccine, but it is unclear whether the deaths are a side-effect of the vaccine.
- The latest figures show that 31.4 million people have received a first COVID vaccine, with 5.2 million of those having also received a second, while a further 10 deaths are recorded, the lowest daily figure since 14 September 2020.
- The UK government confirms that a COVID passport system will be trialled at a comedy evening at Liverpool's Hot Water Comedy Club on 16 April and continue at other events through to mid-May, while a "traffic light" system will indicate the level of risk posed by different countries once foreign travel returns.

==== 4 April ====
- The 2021 University Boat Race is held in Ely, Cambridgeshire, having been moved from its usual venue on the River Thames because of the COVID-19 pandemic.
- A spokesman for the UK government confirms that the operation of any COVID passport scheme would be time limited.

==== 5 April ====
- Everybody in England is to be given access to two free rapid flow tests each week from Friday 9 April.
- Prime Minister Boris Johnson confirms that pubs, restaurants, hairdressers, gyms and non-essential shops in England can reopen from Monday 12 April.

==== 6 April ====
- Trials of the Oxford–AstraZeneca vaccine on children are paused while the Medicines and Healthcare products Regulatory Agency (MHRA) investigates the possibility of a link between the vaccine and blood clots in some adults.
- Prime Minister Boris Johnson urges people to trust the regulator's advice about the Oxford vaccine, and to get themselves vaccinated when invited to do so.
- Leading figures in the UK entertainment industry voice their concern about the potential use of COVID passports as venues reopen, especially if the documents require proof of vaccination.

==== 7 April ====
- Elle Taylor, 24, from Ammanford becomes the first person in the UK to receive the Moderna COVID-19 vaccine at Glangwili Hospital in Carmarthen, as rollout of the third COVID vaccine to be approved for use in the UK begins. The first doses are also given in Scotland.
- Transport Secretary Grant Shapps confirms that driving tests can resume in England and Wales from 12 April.
- Adults under the age of 30 are to be offered an alternative vaccine to the Oxford–AstraZeneca vaccine after a review by the Medicines and Healthcare products Regulatory Agency finds evidence suggesting a link to a rare blood clot. A total of 79 cases of rare blood clots have been found in patients who have received the Oxford vaccine, of which 19 people have died.

==== 8 April ====
- Health Secretary Matt Hancock confirms that the UK has more than enough supply of the Pfizer and Moderna vaccines to vaccinate everyone under 30.
- A scientific study shows the number of COVID infections has fallen by two thirds since February and that the vaccination programme is breaking the link between COVID cases and deaths.
- Official figures show the number of COVID deaths in England and Wales has fallen by 92% since January 2021, while weekly deaths are 5% below the five year average.
- In a letter to the UK government, sporting bodies including the Football Association, Premier League, England and Wales Cricket Board, Rugby Football Union, All-England Tennis Club and Silverstone Circuit give their backing to the idea of COVID passports.

==== 9 April ====
- Philippines, Pakistan, Kenya and Bangladesh are added to the "red list" of countries from where travel to England is banned, with travellers refused entry if they have visited those countries in the preceding ten days.
- As people begin to lay flowers outside Buckingham Palace following the death of Prince Philip, the Palace asks the public not to break COVID rules while paying tribute to the Prince. A plaque erected outside the Palace to announce the Prince's death is removed after an hour to minimise the risk of people congregating, while members of the public are encouraged to sign an online Book of Condolence and donate to charity rather than gather outside Buckingham Palace and Windsor Castle as would be the traditional public response to the death of a senior royal.
- Office for National Statistics figures suggest that COVID-19 rates are down to a sixth of their peak in January 2021.
- Vaccination figures for 8 April show that 449,269 second vaccines were given, a record number for second doses, while 96,242 first doses were also administered.
- The R number for England remains unchanged from the previous week, at 0.8–1.0.

==== 10 April ====
- The UK reports a second day of record doses for second vaccines, with 450,136 administered on 9 April, while 106,878 first doses were given.

==== 11 April ====
- On the eve of the reopening of non-essential retail in England and Wales, the British Retail Consortium urges shoppers to show respect to retail staff by adhering to social-distancing rules and queueing "considerately".
- Another record day of second COVID vaccines is recorded for 10 April, with 475,230 administered, along with 111,109 first vaccines.

==== 12 April ====
- COVID rules are eased in all of the Home Nations, with changes including the reopening of non-essential retail in England and Wales, the end of the "stay at home" order in Northern Ireland, and the return of all school pupils in Northern Ireland and Scotland.
- The UK government announces that everyone in the UK in the top nine priority groups has been offered their first COVID vaccine.

==== 13 April ====
- England and Scotland confirm that adults in the 45–49 age group are now eligible for their first COVID vaccine. In England they are invited to book through the NHS website, while in Scotland they will be invited to attend a vaccination appointment.
- After the United States, South Africa and European Union pause their use of the Janssen COVID-19 vaccine following the discovery of six blood clot cases, the Department of Health and Social Care says the delay will not affect vaccine supplies in the UK. The UK government has ordered 30 million doses of the Johnson & Johnson vaccine, but its use is yet to be approved.
- The remote Scottish island of Fair Isle has become the first area of the UK whose entire population has received both COVID vaccines, with all 48 members of the community fully vaccinated.

==== 14 April ====
- Chris Garton, Chief Solutions Officer at Heathrow Airport tells the House of Commons Transport Committee that delays caused by extensive COVID tests are becoming "untenable", with some passengers waiting up to six hours.
- Denmark ceases giving the Oxford–AstraZeneca vaccine amid concerns about blood clots.
- The North Devon District Council area becomes the first area of the United Kingdom in 2021 to record no COVID cases over seven days, doing so from 3–9 April.

==== 15 April ====
- Figures from NHS England indicate that 4.7 million people were waiting for routine operations and procedures in February 2021, the largest waiting list numbers since records began in 2007. Of those, 388,000 had waited for more than a year, while two million operations took place through January and February 2021, while the health service was under pressure because of the pandemic.

==== 16 April ====
- The Joint Committee on Vaccination and Immunisation changes its advice for pregnant women, recommending they receive the vaccine at the same time as other people in their age group, and that the Pfizer or Moderna vaccines would be preferable. The change follows positive results from trials on hundreds of women in the United States.
- The latest Office for National Statistics data shows that COVID infections in all four nations of the UK have fallen to the lowest level since September 2020, with an estimated one in 500 thought to have the virus in the week up to 10 April.
- England's R number is estimated to be between 0.7 and 1.0.
- Health officials confirm that 77 cases of a strain of COVID from India have been discovered in the UK; the strain is described as a "double-mutant" because two mutant strains are attached to it.
- 10 Downing Street confirms that a scheduled trip to India to be made by Prime Minister Boris Johnson later in the month will still go ahead, despite soaring COVID cases in India, and the identification of a new strain from that country.
- One in six people, around 8.9 million, have received both COVID vaccines, official figures have confirmed.

==== 17 April ====
- The Duke of Edinburgh's funeral is held at St George's Chapel, Windsor, with members of the Royal family observing COVID rules during the service.

==== 18 April ====
- The number of people to receive both COVID vaccinations approaches 10 million, with 9,930,846 having been given their second dose, while 32,849,223 people have received at least one dose.
- Health officials are investigating whether the Indian COVID strain spreads more easily and is resistant to vaccines, but have not designated it as a variant of concern.
- On the day the FA Cup semi-final between Leicester City and Southampton is held at London's Wembley Stadium as a pilot event with 4,000 spectators, it is confirmed that an outdoor gig will be held in Liverpool's Sefton Park on 2 May with near-normal conditions. 5,000 people will be allowed to attend the event without face coverings or social distancing rules, but must provide a negative COVID test beforehand.
- Leaders of the UK's largest hospitality firms have signed an open letter in The Sunday Telegraph to Prime Minister Boris Johnson urging him to stick to the date for the reopening of indoor dining.

==== 19 April ====
- Prime Minister Boris Johnson cancels a planned trip to India amid concern over rising COVID cases in that country.
- India is added to the UK's "red list" of countries from where most travel is prohibited and passengers are required to go into hotel quarantine, with the rules coming into effect from 4am on Friday 23 April.
- The number of people in the UK to receive both vaccinations passes 10 million.
- A new study is seeking young people who have had the COVID virus to be exposed to it again to test how the immune system responds.
- As part of post-COVID plans to reduce its office capacity by 40%, HSBC announces that its Canary Wharf headquarters will have an open plan office in which managers will be required to "hot desk".
- The Isle of Man's third period of lockdown comes to an end.

==== 20 April ====
- The UK's former Chief Scientific Adviser, Professor Mark Walport suggests adding India to the red list may have come too late.
- Prime Minister Boris Johnson announces the establishment of an Antiviral Taskforce to investigate potential COVID treatments that could be taken at home, and that could be available as early as the autumn.
- Office for National Statistics figures have indicated the jobs crisis brought about by the COVID-19 pandemic is affecting the young most of all. 811,000 payroll jobs were lost in the UK in the year to March 2021, with those aged under-35 accounting for 80% of those losses.

==== 21 April ====
- After it is reported that Prime Minister Boris Johnson promised to "fix" tax changes for businessman James Dyson while seeking to obtain ventilators manufactured by his company, Johnson tells Prime Minister's Questions he makes "absolutely no apology at all for shifting heaven and earth" to obtain them for the NHS.
- Professor Adam Finn, of the Joint Committee on Vaccination and Immunisation, warns the UK could experience a "summer surge" in COVID cases as lockdown restrictions are eased.
- Heathrow Airport says it will not allow extra flights from India ahead of that country's addition to the red list.
- Following the cancellation of a number of music festivals scheduled for Summer 2021, organisers of those still planned to go ahead say they are "running out of time" to save those that remain.
- Within days of ending its latest period of lockdown, the Isle of Man reports a cluster of seven new COVID-19 cases (five from this date and two from the previous day).

==== 22 April ====
- Data published by NHS England indicates that 95% of people in England aged over 50 have taken up the offer of a COVID vaccine.
- The final flight arrives at Heathrow from India before that country is added to the red list.
- Driving tests resume in England and Wales, having been suspended since January.
- A case challenging the government over directly awarding contracts for the provision of Personal Protective Equipment (PPE) during the pandemic returns to the High Court, where campaigners are challenging the government's actions.
- With a record backlog of 58,000 Crown Court cases in England and Wales, an agreement is made allowing the Lord Chief Justice to draw on unlimited funds from the government to enable courts to be open whenever a judge is available to hear cases.
- 10 Downing Street announces an inquiry into the exchange of texts between Prime Minister Boris Johnson and businessman James Dyson.

==== 23 April ====
- India is added to the red list from 4AM.
- England's R number is estimated to be between 0.8 and 1.0, a slight rise on the previous week, but infection rates continue to decrease.
- The Football Association confirms that Wembley Stadium will host an extra match during the Euro 2020 tournament after games scheduled to take place in Dublin were moved to other cities because of concerns over COVID and crowd capacity. Under UEFA rules, stadiums must be able to allow 25% spectator capacity during the Euro games.
- Jersey takes steps to reopen tourism by introducing a traffic light system for different countries depending on their COVID status, and adds Wales (with the exception of Newport) to the green list, meaning travel between the two countries is now permitted without the need for quarantine.

==== 24 April ====
- Official figures show that 33,508,590 people, half the UK's estimated population of 66.7 million, have received their first COVID vaccine, while 12 million have received both vaccines. Health Secretary Matt Hancock says he is "absolutely delighted" by the news.

==== 25 April ====
- The UK government announces it is sending 600 pieces of medical equipment to India to help in the country's COVID-19 surge. The equipment includes 495 oxygen concentrators, a device that extracts oxygen from the air to give to patients.

==== 26 April ====
- Prime Minister Boris Johnson denies allegations that he said he would rather see "bodies pile high" than take England into a third lockdown during a conversation in autumn 2020.
- Figures published by the Office for National Statistics indicate government borrowing to be at its highest since World War II, with the figure hitting £303.1bn in the year to March 2021.
- A group of families with relatives deceased because of COVID-19 express their disappointment after the UK government rejects their calls for an immediate inquiry into the handling of the pandemic.
- The European Union launches a legal case against AstraZeneca, accusing it of not having a timely plan for the delivery of vaccines.
- Economic forecasters at Deloitte have predicted a rapid recovery for the UK economy following the pandemic.
- A case of COVID-19 without a known link is identified in the Isle of Man.
- Travel firms are reporting that an increasing number of people are deferring summer breaks in favour of autumn holidays abroad because of uncertainty over the COVID situation.
- England's vaccine rollout is extended to 44-year-olds.

==== 27 April ====
- MPs on the Joint Committee on Human Rights have urged a review of all fixed-penalty notices for breaches of COVID-19 restrictions, describing them as "muddled, discriminatory and unfair".
- The vaccine rollout in England is extended to include those aged 42 and above.

==== 28 April ====
- Health Secretary Matt Hancock confirms that the UK has ordered a further 60 million doses of the Pfizer–BioNTech vaccine to be used for booster jabs in the autumn.
- The UK pledges further help for India with the supply of equipment and support to help with its growing COVID crisis.
- A year after it was suspended because of the pandemic, plans are announced for the musical Hamilton to resume at London's Victoria Palace Theatre on 19 August.
- Supermarket retailer Sainsbury's announces a £261m annual loss in spite of increased sales of food, and of Argos products, during the pandemic.
- A face-to-face conference in Liverpool is held as part of trials for a return to life without restrictions, and attended by 400 delegates. They are not required to wear face coverings or socially distance, or to provide a vaccine certificate, but are asked to take lateral flow tests before and after the event, the data of which will be analysed as part of the UK government's Events and Research Programme.

==== 29 April ====
- Health Secretary Matt Hancock receives his first COVID vaccine at the London Science Museum, where it is administered by Jonathan Van-Tam, England's deputy chief medical officer.

==== 30 April ====
- Analysis by the BBC indicates that 22 million people are living in areas where no COVID-related deaths have happened during April. This is in contrast to January, where 50,000 people were thought to live in such areas.
- Figures produced by the Office for National Statistics indicate COVID cases in the UK have fallen to levels last seen in late summer 2020, with fewer than 1 in 1,000 people infected with the virus.
- A study of UK patients shows a very small number of people were admitted to hospital several weeks after receiving their first COVID vaccination, with 1% of COVID hospital admissions being of people who had been vaccinated. Hospital admissions have also tailed off as the number of people having been vaccinated increases.
- The R number in England is estimated to be between 0.8 and 1.1, slightly higher than the previous week.

=== May 2021 ===
==== 1 May ====
- A study published in The Lancet indicates that people from a South Asian background were at greater risk of infection, hospitalisation and death as a result of COVID than any other ethnic group during the second wave of the pandemic.

==== 2 May ====
- Foreign Secretary Dominic Raab tells the BBC the UK is "in a good position" to "get life back as close to normal as possible" in June, but that some safeguards, such as social distancing and the wearing of face coverings, may need to remain in place beyond then.
- National Car Parks (NCP), the UK's largest car park operator, has launched a legal case to help it cut rents and exit contracts for unprofitable parking facilities, citing the effect of the pandemic which has led to an 80% decrease in revenue.
- The UK government confirms plans to send a further 1,000 ventilators to India to help with their COVID situation.
- The first live gig in more than a year to be staged without social distancing takes place at Liverpool's Sefton Park. The gig, attended by 5,000 concertgoers and headlined by indie band Blossoms, is part of trials being staged to restart large events.

==== 3 May ====
- Prime Minister Boris Johnson says there will be some "opening up" of foreign travel on 17 May, but stresses the need to be cautious. Johnson also suggests there is a "good chance" England's 1m social distancing rule can be scrapped from 21 June.
- One further COVID death is recorded, the lowest number of daily deaths since 30 June 2020.
- With the Muslim holy month of Ramadan under way the BBC reports on how some UK mosques are not allowing women in to attend prayers due to the pandemic, since men and women pray separately in mosques.
- The 2021 World Snooker Championship concludes at Sheffield's Crucible Theatre, having become the first sporting event to have a capacity crowd for its final.

==== 4 May ====
- Downing Street confirms that plans to update the NHS app so it can be used as a COVID passport will not be complete by the time international travel resumes on 17 May.
- Professor Neil Ferguson, whose modelling led to the first national lockdown in the UK, tells the BBC there are unlikely to be further such restrictions, and instead it is "likely to be on a steady course now out of this pandemic".
- Odeon Cinemas confirms plans to reopen most of its 120 UK outlets on 17 May.
- The Royal Albert Hall confirms it will reopen on 29 May to limited capacity, with plans to begin full capacity concerts from 6 July with a James Blunt concert.
- The Association of Independent Festivals warned that even with the lifting of restrictions, music festivals faced the risk that they would be required to cancel due to a lack of government insurance.

==== 5 May ====
- The UK government announces an extra £29.3m of funding to help with the development of vaccines to combat new variants of COVID by increasing research at the Porton Down research facility. The amount is in addition to the £19.7m already promised.
- Office for National Statistics figures suggest rates of depression have been higher among women and young adults during the second peak of the pandemic, with 40% of women aged 16–29 affected compared to 26% of men in the same age group, while 1 in 5 adults experienced were experiencing depression in January 2021.
- Goldman Sachs tells its UK staff to be ready to return to the office in June, while KPMG announces its staff will be office-based for four days each fortnight, while working from home the rest of the time.
- Delegates from India, who were invited to the forthcoming 47th G7 summit in the UK are required to self-isolate after two cases of COVID were detected among their number.
- The World Health Organization urges countries, including the UK, to send supplies of vaccines to poorer countries before organising booster jabs for their own population.
- It is reported that UK travellers from "red list" countries are flying home via Turkey, which is not on the red list, in order to avoid expensive hotel quarantine fees.

==== 6 May ====
- NHS England is in the process of revising its vaccination booking website after concerns that it could reveal the vaccination status of people.
- Stella Creasy, a Labour Member of Parliament, highlights the difficulties pregnant women are facing in getting vaccinated, with clinics unable to guarantee they will have the right type of vaccine available. The Pfizer–BioNTech vaccine and Moderna vaccine are preferred as there is more safety information available for them.
- Research carried out by the Education Endowment Foundation suggests poorer children have fallen further behind in maths because of the pandemic, with primary school pupils a month further behind than at the beginning of the first lockdown.
- A BBC survey indicates that 43 of the UK's 50 largest employers are not planning to bring their workforce back to the office fulltime, amounting to around a million employees.
- The Bank of England forecasts the UK economy will grow by 7.25% in 2021, the fastest growth in 70 years, as COVID restrictions are lifted and society returns to pre-pandemic activity.
- Black leaders in the UK have blamed the country's racist past for the lower uptake in COVID vaccinations among black people.

==== 7 May ====
- A new traffic light system for international travel is published for England, with 12 countries added to a "green list" from 17 May. The green list countries include Israel, Portugal and Gibraltar, and people arriving from there will not be required to quarantine. Several European countries including Spain and France are added to the amber list, the largest group of destinations, from where travellers will be required to isolate at home for five days. The remaining countries are on the red list and require quarantine at a government designated hotel. At the same time, Turkey, the Maldives and Nepal are added to the red list effective from 4am on 12 May.
- Most adults under the age of 40 are to be offered an alternative to the Oxford–AstraZeneca vaccine amid concerns about its link to a rare blood clot. The change threatens to delay Northern Ireland's vaccination programme.
- Public Health England declared a version of the Indian variant COVID a "variant of concern", prompting Prime Minister Boris Johnson to warn that outbreaks of it must be handled carefully.

==== 8 May ====
- The UK's travel industry expresses disappointment at the small number of countries added to the government's green list, describing as "overly cautious".

==== 9 May ====
- Prime Minister Boris Johnson invites the leaders of the UK's devolved governments to a "Team UK" summit to discuss recovery following the COVID crisis.

==== 10 May ====
- Prime Minister Boris Johnson confirms the "single biggest step" in the relaxing of restrictions for England on 17 May, but urges people to "exercise caution and common sense". From that date indoor hospitality will reopen and people will be able to hug again.
- Johnson also confirms that face coverings will no longer be required in schools and colleges in England from 17 May.
- The UK's COVID-19 alert level is lowered from four to three, meaning the virus is in general circulation but not rising significantly. The change comes on a day when zero COVID related deaths are announced for England, Scotland and Northern Ireland, while four are recorded in Wales.

==== 11 May ====
- At the State Opening of Parliament, Prime Minister Boris Johnson sets out plans to take the UK forward in the post-COVID era, saying that the government "won't settle for going back to the way things were".
- Johnson pledges that there will be a public inquiry in to the government's handling of the COVID crisis in the current parliamentary session.
- The 2021 Brit Awards are held at London's O2 Arena; the test event is the first major awards ceremony to be held in person during the COVID era.

==== 12 May ====
- Prime Minister Boris Johnson confirms that an independent inquiry into the government's handling of the COVID crisis will begin in spring 2022, and says the government is "fully committed to learning the lessons at every stage".
- Online travel agent On the Beach halts sales of summer holidays for 2021 amid uncertainty over the COVID situation.
- Official figures indicate the UK economy shrank by 1.5% in the first three months of 2021, but grew by 2.1% in March 2021, the fastest increase since August 2020.

==== 13 May ====
- The government expresses its concern at the increase in the number of cases of the Indian variant COVID and says that it may be necessary to reimpose "economic and social" restrictions at a local or regional level. Cases have been detected in London, Bolton, Tyneside and Nottingham, and surge testing has been increased in those areas. Ministers are also considering whether to bring forward second doses of the vaccine in those areas.
- Prime Minister Boris Johnson says he is "anxious" about the Indian variant, and is "ruling nothing out" to tackle it.
- The UK's Competition and Markets Authority warns travel operators they must be ready to refund customers if holidays abroad are cancelled as a result of COVID-19.
- Figures from the Office for National Statistics indicate crime in England and Wales fell by 8% during 2020, largely as a result of the reporting of fewer thefts during the year's periods of lockdown.
- A peer review of the NHS COVID-19 contact-tracing app concludes it has helped to prevent hundreds of thousands of COVID cases, and thousands of deaths.
- The 2021 Champions League Final between Chelsea and Manchester City, scheduled for 29 May, is moved from Istanbul in Turkey to Porto in Portugal amid rising COVID cases in Turkey; 6,000 fans from each club are scheduled to attend the game.

==== 14 May ====
- Prime Minister Boris Johnson confirms the next round of relaxion of the COVID-19 restrictions in England will go ahead on 17 May, but that the increase in numbers of the Indian variant COVID could pose "serious disruption" to the easing of restrictions on 21 June. He further suggests some "serious choices" may be required if the variant is found to be "significantly" more transmissible.
- In order to help tackle the Indian variant, the gap between first and second vaccinations is narrowed to eight weeks for people in the top nine priority groups.
- The Army is to be deployed in Bolton and Blackburn with Darwen to help with the distribution of COVID tests.
- Portugal confirms that it will allow UK tourists to enter the country from 17 May.

==== 15 May ====
- Health Minister Edward Argar urges people in areas affected by the Indian variant COVID to get vaccinated following a slight increase in the number of hospital admissions by unvaccinated people aged 35–65.
- A crowd of 21,000 spectators attend the 2021 FA Cup Final at Wembley Stadium, where Leicester City beat Chelsea 1–0.
- Home Secretary Priti Patel is accused of lobbying a fellow government minister on behalf of a face mask manufacturer that was trying to win a contract in May 2020.

==== 16 May ====
- Health Secretary Matt Hancock says there is "increasing confidence" that COVID vaccines work effectively against the Indian variant of the virus.
- Research carried out by Public Health England suggests COVID vaccines have saved 11,700 lives and prevented 33,000 hospital admissions.
- Companies in the leisure sector say they need additional help after a year in which they have been "haemorrhaging cash" as a result of the pandemic.

==== 17 May ====
- Health Secretary Matt Hancock confirms there are 2,323 cases of Indian variant COVID in England across 86 local authorities, with the Indian variant now the dominant strain of the virus. Scientists believe it spreads more easily, but early data indicates it can be prevented with vaccination. Hancock confirms those in hospital with the variant are people who declined the vaccine when it was offered to them, and urges people to come forward for the vaccine when invited to do so.
- COVID rules are eased in England, Scotland and Wales, with pubs and restaurants allowed to reopen. Indoor mixing is permitted for up to six people from two separate households, and hugging is also mostly no longer advised against in England for the first time since March 2020. Outdoor weddings can have up to 30 attendees, while there is no cap on the number of people attending funerals, though numbers are dependent on the size of the venue.
- BBC News reports that the spread of Indian variant COVID could delay the next round of restrictions relaxation on 21 June.
- Overseas travel to a small number of countries, including Portugal, becomes possible for people living in England, Scotland and Wales.

==== 18 May ====
- During a visit to a COVID vaccination centre, Prime Minister Boris Johnson says there is "nothing conclusive" in the data that means England "would have to deviate from the roadmap" out of lockdown.
- Environment Secretary George Eustice confirms that surge testing is under way in Bolton to detect cases of the Indian variant COVID, while ministers are to increase efforts to encourage people to take up the vaccine when it is offered.
- Dominic Cummings, the former chief special adviser to the Johnson government, says that government "secrecy" during the pandemic "contributed greatly to the catastrophe".
- Office for National Statistics figures indicate an increase in job vacancies and a fall in unemployment. There were 657,000 vacancies in the period from February to April 2021, up around 48,400 on the previous quarter, while unemployment fell slightly to 4.8% in the three months to March 2021.
- After a group of MPs and peers write to Prime Minister Boris Johnson urging Long COVID to be classed as an "occupational disease" for key workers, government advisers tell the BBC a decision on whether essential workers with the illness should be given compensation could take up to a year.
- It is reported that a number of universities in the UK are planning to keep online learning into the autumn term, prompting concerns about disruption to another academic year.
- Jenny McGee, the nurse who treated Boris Johnson during his spell in hospital with COVID-19, resigns from the NHS, citing poor nurses' pay and lack of respect from the government for the profession.
- The leisure magazine Boat International reports that £1bn has been spent on "superyachts" during 2021 by wealthy people wishing to escape COVID restrictions.

==== 19 May ====
- Following a review of fresh data, Prime Minister Boris Johnson tells Prime Minister's Questions there is "increasing confidence" COVID vaccines work against all strains of the virus, including the Indian variant.
- With 2,967 cases of Indian variant COVID now confirmed in the UK, surge testing and vaccination is expanded to a further six areas – Bedford, Burnley, Hounslow, Kirklees, Leicester and North Tyneside.
- Members of the public are urged to take part in a trial of a third COVID vaccine to determine its effectiveness against future strains of the virus. The plan is to trial a third dose with working age adults and those aged over 75.
- Following a warning from the Prime Minister the previous day that people should not travel to amber list countries, confusion arises after government minister Gillian Keegan suggests people should make up their own minds and that it is a matter of "personal responsibility".
- Organisers of the Glastonbury Festival secure a licence to hold a one-off two-day event in September 2021, which is provisionally titled the Equinox Festival.

==== 20 May ====
- A report seen by the BBC suggests that failures in England's Test and Trace system are partly responsible for a surge in Indian variant COVID after eight local authorities did not have full access to the data for three weeks during April.
- After the UK government advises people not to travel to "amber list" countries for a holiday, easyJet boss Johan Lundgren gives his support to such travellers, saying it is "absolutely legal" to travel to amber list countries.
- The Duke of Cambridge shares a photograph on social media showing him receiving his first COVID vaccine; he was given the vaccine two days earlier.
- The Yorkshire Symphony Orchestra, disbanded in 1955, reforms to give a series of concerts to help musicians affected by the pandemic.

==== 21 May ====
- Spain announces the lifting of restrictions for UK travellers from Monday 24 May, meaning they will not be affected by restrictions on non-essential travel to the European Union and will not need to provide a negative PCR test.
- Heathrow Airport confirms that Terminal 3 is to open as a dedicated terminal for arrivals from red list countries from 1 June.
- Office for National Statistics figures show that UK retail sales grew by 9.2% during April 2021, largely fuelled by sales of clothes.
- Office for National Statistics figures also suggest there is early evidence of a "potential increase" in COVID cases in England after they fell for five consecutive weeks, but rates remain low; rates in Wales and Northern Ireland have remained stable while rates in Scotland have fallen.
- The UK government quietly updates its advice on its website for people living in eight areas of England where Indian variant COVID is said to be spreading fastest, but no official announcement is made; the changes are reported three days later. The areas affected are Bolton, Blackburn, Kirklees, Bedford, Burnley, Leicester, Hounslow and North Tyneside, and people in these areas are advised not to meet up indoors while non-essential travel to and from these areas is advised against.
- Public Health England officials are investigating a new COVID variant which has presented 49 cases in the Yorkshire and Humber area.
- The 2021 Sunday Times Rich List is published, indicating the wealth of the UK's billionaires increased by 21.7% during the year of the COVID crisis, rising by £106.5bn to £597.2bn; the UK also has a record 171 billionaires.

==== 22 May ====
- Germany designates the UK a "virus variant region", requiring people arriving from the UK to quarantine for 14 days.
- Figures released by NHS England show more than 50 million COVID vaccinations have been administered in the UK, with 31,546,846 having received a first vaccine, and 18,699,556 a second.
- Research carried out by Public Health England shows both the Pfizer and AstraZeneca vaccines are effective against the Indian COVID variant. Two doses of both vaccines are as effective against the Indian variant as the Kent variant, but one dose is believed to only provide 33% effectiveness against the Indian variant as opposed to 50% for the Kent variant. A single dose of both vaccines is believed to reduce the risk of against hospitalisation and death.
- The UK government has accelerated its sewage testing programme for early signs of COVID-19, with the programme now covering two thirds of England.
- The Scottish and Welsh Governments have sent oxygen and ventilator equipment to India, which is in the midst of a COVID surge.

==== 23 May ====
- The UK passes the milestone of 60 million vaccines, with 22 million people having received their second dose; collectively 762,361 vaccines were administered on 22 May, the second largest daily total of the programme.
- Home Secretary Priti Patel rejects claims made by former Downing Street adviser Dominic Cummings that the UK government pursued a policy of herd immunity during the early stages of the pandemic.

==== 24 May ====
- Analysis from Springboard indicates a week-on-week rise of 1.1% in retail customer footfall, but it is still 28.7% lower than for May 2019.
- Patient watchdog HealthWatch England warns that complaints about access to NHS dentistry have risen by a fifth, with some people told they may need to wait for as long as three years for dental treatment.
- UK-based cinema retailer Cineworld hopes to make a "good recovery" after more people than expected bought tickets on its reopening weekend.

==== 25 May ====
- The UK government updates its advice for the eight areas worst hit by Indian variant COVID following confusion. Stressing that it has not imposed a local lockdown for the areas, the advice is now to minimise travel to and from them rather than to avoid it.
- Bill Shakespeare, 81, who was the second person to receive the Pfizer–BioNTech vaccine, and the first man, dies of an unrelated illness.
- The families of three patients who died after catching COVID while in hospital have blamed mistakes made by NHS trusts for the deaths.

==== 26 May ====
- Former Downing Street adviser Dominic Cummings gives evidence to MPs about the UK government's handling of the COVID crisis. He claims that tens of thousands of people died unnecessarily because of government mistakes, that Boris Johnson ignored scientific advice, delayed imposing lockdowns and is "unfit for the job" of Prime Minister, and that Health Secretary Matt Hancock should have been removed from office for lying. He also apologises for breaching rules during the first lockdown. Hancock denies the allegations, while Johnson defends his handling of the situation.
- Transport Secretary Grant Shapps suggests destinations such as the Canary Islands and Majorca may be placed on the green list from 7 June.
- The French Government announces that arrivals from the UK must quarantine for seven days from 31 May.
- More than 30 West End performers of South Asian and Middle Eastern descent record a song titled "It Means Beautiful" in aid of COVID relief efforts in India.
- Doctor and patient groups are warning of a potential tsunami that could overwhelm GPs due to a shortage of GPs, a rising number of patients needing treatment and continued health service restrictions.

==== 27 May ====
- COVID vaccinations are opened to everyone aged 18 and over in Northern Ireland, making it the first part of the UK to offer the vaccine to all adults.
- Prime Minister Boris Johnson says there is nothing in the data to suggest the final lifting of restrictions in England cannot go ahead on 21 June.
- Health Secretary Matt Hancock gives evidence to MPs regarding the government's handling of the COVID crisis, where he rejects allegations that he lied as "not true". Prime Minister Boris Johnson also rejects the claims, made by Dominic Cummings, saying his "commentary" does not "bear any relation to reality".
- Data from Public Health England shows that cases of Indian variant COVID have risen from 3,535 to 6,959 over the preceding week, and now account for 75% of new cases. Health Secretary Matt Hancock says it was always expected that cases would rise as restrictions are eased, but it is "critical" to monitor the link between cases and hospitalisations.
- Scientists at the University of Essex are reported to be working on a phone app that detects whether someone has COVID by the sound of their cough.

==== 28 May ====
- The single dose Janssen vaccine has been approved for use by the UK medicines regulator, with deployment expected to take place later in the year.
- The Royal College of Surgeons has called for the establishment of specialist hubs to deal with the "colossal backlog" of five million non-urgent operations that have built up in England because of the COVID crisis. With some 436,000 people waiting for longer than a year for treatment the UK government says it is working "to accelerate the recovery of services".
- Prime Minister Boris Johnson has expressed his "full confidence" in Health Secretary Matt Hancock over allegations he lied over protecting care homes from COVID.
- Business Secretary Kwasi Kwarteng says there is no evidence in the data to suggest the end of restrictions will be delayed past 21 June, but he cannot guarantee it.
- Office for National Statistics figures show signs of a small increase in COVID cases across the UK, largely driven by the Indian variant.
- The Republic of Ireland announces that travel between the UK and Ireland can resume from 19 July, with Ireland adopting the EU COVID certificate and using a similar principle for countries such as the United Kingdom and United States.

==== 29 May ====
- The Duchess of Cambridge says she is "hugely grateful" after receiving her first COVID vaccination the previous day.

==== 30 May ====
- Chris Hopson, the head of NHS Providers, says that "very, very few" COVID patients in hospital have received both vaccines, suggesting vaccines offer a "very high" level of protection against the virus.

==== 31 May ====
- Professor Ravi Gupta of the University of Cambridge, and one of the scientists advising the UK government on pandemic management, suggests there are early signs the UK is entering a third wave of COVID infections.
- The UK government announces a drive to get everyone over the age of 50 or classed as clinically vulnerable fully vaccinated by 21 June.
- As England's ban on evictions expires, the Joseph Rowntree Foundation warns that as many as a million people face losing their homes in the coming months; 400,000 householders have already been received, or been told they will receive, eviction notices, the charity says.
- The Organisation for Economic Co-operation and Development has suggested post-COVID UK economic recovery could be stronger than predicted, with growth of 7.2% in 2021, an increase from its previous projection of 5.1% in March.
- The World Health Organization changes its COVID variant naming policy, adopting Greek letters rather than areas of the world. Consequently, the Kent variant is renamed the Alpha variant, the Brazil variant becomes the Beta variant and the Indian variant is renamed the Delta variant.

=== June 2021 ===
==== 1 June ====
- The UK records its first day with zero COVID-related deaths since March 2020; 3,165 new cases of the virus are announced.
- Figures published by Nationwide Building Society show UK house prices rose by 10.9% in the year to May 2021.

==== 2 June ====
- Government figures show that 75% of UK adults have received their first dose of the vaccine, while 49.5% have received their second. Health Secretary Matt Hancock attributes the vaccine programme's success to the lack of queue jumping and jabs being given "according to need, not ability to pay".
- Prime Minister Boris Johnson says there is still "nothing in the data" to suggest England's 21 June date for lifting restrictions should be delayed.
- The UK government announces its plan to help pupils in England catch up on missed education. The scheme is allocated £1.4bn over three years, but is criticised as a "damp squib" by headteachers. Prime Minister Boris Johnson promises there will be more money to follow. Sir Kevan Collins resigns as Education Recovery Commissioner, stating the funding "falls far short of what is needed".

==== 3 June ====
- The UK government announces Portugal will be removed from the green list as a travel destination from 4am on 8 June and added to the amber list, meaning only essential travel is permitted. The changes are made after a doubling of COVID rates in Portugal since the last review. Afghanistan, Bahrain, Costa Rica, Egypt, Sri Lanka, Sudan, and Trinidad and Tobago are reclassified from amber to red meaning travel is prohibited except under exceptional circumstances. No countries are added to the green list.
- As Prime Minister Boris Johnson receives his second COVID vaccination, it is confirmed the number of people receiving both vaccines has passed 50%.
- Scottish First Minister Nicola Sturgeon calls for the UK government to extend the furlough scheme for as long as is needed. Cabinet Office Minister Michael Gove says the government is "open minded" about the suggestion.
- Data published by Public Health England indicates there have been 12,431 cases of Indian variant COVID since it was first identified in the UK, and it is now the dominant strain in the UK.

==== 4 June ====
- The Medicines and Healthcare products Regulatory Agency approves the use of the Pfizer–BioNTech vaccine for children aged 12–15.
- Portugal questions the logic of the UK's decision to add it to the red list of travel destinations as, apart from a spike in Lisbon, COVID cases are at a similar rate in the two countries.
- Travel operator Tui says that despite the change in Portugal's status, 50% of those who have booked a holiday to Portugal with them in June are still planning to go ahead with their trip.
- Airlines begin laying on extra flights ahead of Portugal's move to amber status.
- Figures from the Office for National Statistics suggests the number of COVID cases rose by as much as two thirds in the week ending 29 May when compared to the preceding week. The ONS estimates 1 in 660 people had the virus in that week, but hospital cases were not increasing.
- Nepalese Prime Minister KP Sharma Oli makes a plea for vaccines from his British counterpart Boris Johnson as Nepal experiences a surge in COVID-19 cases.
- As the UK prepares to host the 47th G7 summit in Cornwall, the heads of the Wellcome Trust and Unicef in the UK send an open letter to Prime Minister Boris Johnson urging the UK to show "historic leadership" by sharing vaccine doses with other countries. The letter warns progress made by the UK could be "short lived" if enough people in other countries are not vaccinated.
- UK filming of Mission: Impossible – Dead Reckoning Part One is halted for two weeks following positive COVID tests among the crew.

==== 5 June ====
- The number of people to receive their first vaccine in the UK passes 40 million; 27 million have received both vaccines.
- Chris Hopson, the boss of NHS Providers tells BBC Breakfast the number of people with Indian variant COVID admitted to hospital has risen, but not significantly, and suggests vaccination is breaking the link between infection and hospitalisation.
- Coventry begins its year-long Coventry UK City of Culture 2021 celebrations, delayed because of the COVID crisis.

==== 6 June ====
- Health Secretary Matt Hancock tells Sky News that Indian variant COVID is 40% more transmissible, but confirms that two vaccine doses work just as effectively against it as previous variants. He also says the government is "absolutely open" to delaying the next round of lifting restrictions past 21 June. On the topic of care home patients, he rejects claims made by Dominic Cummings that he said they were being tested for COVID before being discharged from hospital and returned to residential homes, but that they "would" be tested once adequate capacity was in place.
- It is reported Prime Minister Boris Johnson is to urge the G7 leaders to commit to vaccinating the world against COVID-19 by the end of 2022 at the forthcoming G7 summit on Friday.

==== 7 June ====
- Figures from the Halifax Building Society show house prices increased by 9.5% in the year to May 2021, largely fuelled by the UK's stamp duty holiday.
- A survey has suggested the pandemic will lead to a shortage of certain products during the summer months, with companies struggling to source supplies of goods such as garden furniture, picnic baskets and outdoor toys.
- Airline bosses have urged the UK and US to establish a transatlantic travel corridor ahead of the G7 summit.
- Television journalist Kay Burley returns to Sky News following a six-month absence imposed by her breach of COVID restrictions while celebrating her 60th birthday in December 2020.

==== 8 June ====
- England's Euro 2020 group matches at Wembley Stadium are to become the first UK events where attendance will require proof of full vaccination, it is announced.
- Figures from the Office for National Statistics have suggested less than a quarter of pubs are confident they will still be trading at the end of the summer.

==== 9 June ====
- Following a legal case brought against the UK government by the Good Law Project, the High Court rules that the government acted unlawfully when it awarded a £560,000 contract to undertake market research into public opinions about COVID-19 to a firm run by former colleagues of Cabinet Office Minister Michael Gove and former Downing Street adviser Dominic Cummings.
- As figures show the number of people in hospital with COVID has exceeded 1,000, Prime Minister Boris Johnson says the government will need to assess the extent to which vaccination has provided the public with protection before making a decision over the 21 June relaxing of restrictions.
- The UK records 7,540 new COVID cases, the highest number since late February.
- Andrew Lloyd Webber tells The Telegraph that he plans to reopen his theatres on 21 June "come hell or high water" and will risk arrest.

==== 10 June ====
- Prime Minister Boris Johnson announces that the UK will donate 100 million vaccines to poorer countries, starting in the next few weeks.
- Figures from the Organisation for Economic Co-operation and Development (OECD) show the UK economy grew slower than the economies of other leading countries during the first three months of 2021, and was 8.7% smaller than at the end of 2019.
- Health Secretary Matt Hancock gives evidence to MPs about his role in the government's handling of the COVID crisis. He says that going into lockdown before 23 March 2020 would have gone against scientific advice, and that Dominic Cummings wanted him sacked from the government.
- British Airways puts thousands of its staff back on furlough because of delays to the restart of international travel. It had started to bring them back to work in anticipation of an expansion in the number of travellers, but with a limited number of countries on the green travel list, has made the decision to re-furlough.

==== 11 June ====
- The 47th G7 summit gets under way in Cornwall. In his opening comments, Prime Minister Boris Johnson urges the world to "build back better" as it recovers from the COVID crisis.
- Figures from Public Health England indicate that two thirds of people who have contracted Indian variant and half of those who have died from it, have not been vaccinated. The data also suggests the Indian variant is 60% more transmissible than the Kent variant.
- England's R number is estimated to be between 1.2 and 1.4, having risen from the previous week's value of between 1 and 1.2.
- Parkrun is given the go-ahead to restart in more than 500 locations from 26 June following approval from local authorities. The events will return subject to the UK government's roadmap announcement on 14 June.
- The 2021 Birthday Honours are published, with a significant portion of those recognised being people who played a part in the COVID vaccination programme, and community volunteers who helped during the crisis.
- The British–Irish Council meets in County Fermanagh to discuss recovery from the COVID crisis. The meeting is chaired by Arlene Foster in one of her final acts as First Minister of Northern Ireland.

==== 12 June ====
- Prime Minister Boris Johnson says there will be a "cautious but irreversible" lifting of restrictions after reports plans for 21 June could be delayed for up to a month.
- The Queen's Official Birthday is marked with a scaled back Trooping the Colour event at Windsor Castle.

==== 13 June ====
- As the 47th G7 summit comes to an end, Prime Minister Boris Johnson announces that members have pledged to donate a billion vaccines to poor countries as a "big step towards vaccinating the world".
- Ireland's Foreign Minister, Simon Coveney, tells RTÉ News the Irish Government is considering introducing stricter quarantine rules for travellers from the UK because of rising cases of Indian variant COVID.

==== 14 June ====
- Prime Minister Boris Johnson announces that England's relaxation of COVID-19 restrictions planned for 21 June will be delayed by four weeks, until 19 July. The cap on wedding parties will be removed though. By then it is planned that every adult will have been offered a first COVID vaccine, with at least three quarters having been fully vaccinated. Leading figures in the live music and theatre sectors describe the delay as a "hammer blow" to their industries. The hospitality industry urge the government to provide urgent financial help for the sector.

==== 15 June ====
- Downing Street has said that Prime Minister Boris Johnson is determined the final round of restrictions will be lifted on 19 July.
- First Minister of Scotland Nicola Sturgeon says that Scotland's move to the lowest level of COVID restrictions is likely to be delayed by three weeks. The change had been scheduled for 28 June.
- Johnson condemns protestors who harassed journalist Nicholas Watt, the political editor of BBC Two's Newsnight, during an anti-lockdown demonstration outside Downing Street the previous day. Footage of the incident has been circulated online.
- Ireland introduces new rules for travellers from the UK, requiring anyone who has not been vaccinated to self-isolate for ten days upon arrival.

==== 16 June ====
- MPs vote 461–60 to delay the final lifting of restrictions from 21 June to 19 July.
- The Prime Minister's Official Spokesman says that Boris Johnson has complete confidence in Health Secretary Matt Hancock after Dominic Cummings published a series of expletive-laden WhatsApp messages reported to be from Johnson in which Hancock is described as being "fucking hopeless".
- The BBC reports that UK vaccine experts are unlikely to recommend the vaccination of 12 to 17-year-olds.
- Goldman Sachs delays the return to work of its UK staff following the delay of the lifting of COVID restrictions. NatWest are also reviewing their return to work policy.
- Ryanair and Manchester Airport Group announce plans to launch legal action against the UK government over the travel traffic lights system, calling for greater transparency over the decision-making process and criteria for categorising the countries.
- Katherine Rowley, a deaf campaigner from Leeds, launches legal action against the UK government for not providing in-person British Sign Language interpreters during Downing Street COVID briefings.
- It is reported Ofcom have received 373 complaints relating to an anti-government policy monologue on the COVID-19 lockdown in Britain that aired on GB News during the opening night's edition of Tonight Live with Dan Wootton on 13 June.

==== 17 June ====
- The UK records 11,007 new COVID cases, the highest number since February 2021, and 19 deaths, the highest number for a month.
- A survey indicates that roughly 1.5 million fewer operations were carried out in England and Wales during 2020, and that there will be disruption to procedures for millions for years to come.
- Plans to ease restrictions in Northern Ireland are pushed back until 5 July.
- BBC News reports that no significant changes in COVID restrictions are likely for Wales until July because of concerns about the Indian variant.
- It is reported that employers can claim from the furlough scheme for any staff who are self-isolating.
- Jacob Rees-Mogg, the Leader of the House of Commons, describes Health Secretary Matt Hancock as a "successful genius" following previous criticism of him by Dominic Cummings.

==== 18 June ====
- Office for National Statistics figures for the week ending 12 June suggest one in 540 people are infected with COVID-19, with the Indian variant counting for the majority of cases reported by Public Health England.
- First Minister of Wales Mark Drakeford confirms the lifting of COVID restrictions in Wales will be postponed for four weeks, and warns the country is at the start of a third wave of COVID. During the four weeks a further 500,000 vaccinations are planned, mostly second doses.
- Figures from the Office for National Statistics show that retail sales fell by 1.4% between April and May as people chose to visit reopened bars and restaurants rather than buying food from supermarkets.
- Organisers of the Notting Hill Carnival have decided not to hold a street event in 2021, because of the short amount of time left before the August Bank Holiday weekend, and the danger of the event having to be cancelled.
- Former Business Secretary Andrea Leadsom has claimed some people on furlough do not want to go back to work because life at home is preferable where they have gardens with "great vegetables growing", while others face mental health issues about returning to work.
- Andrew Lloyd Webber rejects an offer from Prime Minister Boris Johnson to add his new musical Cinderella to a pilot scheme for full capacity events.

==== 19 June ====
- The latest figures indicate that 42 million people have had their first COVID vaccination while 31 million have had both.
- Government scientific adviser Professor Adam Finn warns Indian variant COVID is fuelling a third wave of infections in the UK.
- Londoners received tens of thousands of COVID-19 jabs on Saturday as the football grounds in the capital were transformed into mass vaccination centres.

==== 20 June ====
- The Sunday Telegraph reports that Health Secretary Matt Hancock is alleged to have withheld information about a favourable vaccine study in the days preceding the decision to delay the full lifting of restrictions in England. On 10 June Hancock is alleged to have seen a Public Health England study showing the Oxford and Pfizer vaccines to be more effective against Indian variant COVID than previous strains of the virus, but did not include details of it in information disseminated to other Cabinet colleagues before the decision to delay the lifting of restrictions was taken on 13 June.

==== 21 June ====
- Health Secretary Matt Hancock says that a programme for booster vaccinations during the autumn will be outlined in a few weeks.
- Prime Minister Boris Johnson says that things are "looking good" for the lifting of restrictions in England on 19 July.

==== 22 June ====
- Figures show that government borrowing in May 2021 was £24.3bn, compared to £43.7bn for the same month in 2020, a fall of £19.4bn.
- Leaked documents have suggested former Downing Street adviser Dominic Cummings tried to fast-track the awarding of a £530,000 grant at the beginning of the pandemic by bypassing the usual process of awarding grants.
- Ministers are reported to be working on a scheme that would allow people who have received both COVID vaccines to avoid being required to quarantine on arrival in the UK from an amber list country.
- A University of Oxford study is trialling the use of Ivermectin for people over 50 with COVID symptoms to see if the drug can help to avoid hospitalisations.

==== 23 June ====
- In a letter to the Institute of Directors and insolvency firm R3, Business Secretary Kwasi Kwarteng says the UK government will take a "cautious approach" to companies that owe it money in the wake of the COVID crisis, with insolvency being a last resort.
- Research carried out by Reuters suggests trust in news reporting has increased in the UK during the COVID crisis.
- Travel industry employees stage a day of protests against COVID restrictions on travel abroad.
- Cameras are invited to record Prime Minister Boris Johnson's first face-to-face audience with the Queen (a meeting usually held in private) at which she describes Health Secretary Matt Hancock as a "poor man".
- Dr Nikki Kanani, medical director for primary care with NHS England, reports that the ethnicity gap in the uptake of vaccinations has closed with more people from ethnic groups booking appointments, but warns the government is not "tackling all of the hesitancy".

==== 24 June ====
- The Balearic Islands, Madeira, Malta, Barbados, Antigua, Barbuda, Dominica, Grenada, Anguilla, Montserrat, Bermuda, British Antarctic Territory, British Indian Ocean Territory, British Virgin Islands, Cayman Islands, Pitcairn, and Turks and Caicos will be added to the destination green list from 4am on 30 June, meaning travellers arriving into the UK from these locations will no longer be required to quarantine. The Dominican Republic, Eritrea, Haiti, Mongolia, Tunisia and Uganda are added to the red list, meaning all but essential travel to them is prohibited.
- Official figures show the number of deaths outnumbered the number of births in 2020, only the second year this has happened since the late 1890s, with 683,000 births compared with almost 690,000 deaths. The last year this happened was 1976.
- Chancellor Rishi Sunak tells The Times he expects to stop wearing a face covering "as soon as possible" after it is no longer legally required in England, while Environment Secretary George Eustice says they will be optional after 19 July.

==== 25 June ====
- Health Secretary Matt Hancock apologises for breaking social distancing rules after pictures of him kissing an aide with whom he has been having an extramarital affair appear in the media.
- The addition of more green list countries leads to a drop then a hike in the prices of flights as extra capacity is added by airlines then demand increases.
- Figures from the Office for National Statistics indicate that COVID levels have returned to their highest levels since early April, but that the vaccination programme is making a difference to the severity of cases.
- A study of nine pilot events collectively attended by a total of 58,000 people has found no major transmission to have occurred, with just 28 COVID cases detected.

==== 26 June ====
- Matt Hancock resigns as Health Secretary following his breach of COVID restrictions, saying in his letter of resignation that the government "owe it to people who have sacrificed so much in this pandemic to be honest when we have let them down". Former Chancellor Sajid Javid is subsequently confirmed as his successor.
- BBC News tells the story of four women who allege they faced sexual harassment from security guards while staying in quarantine hotels.
- Hairdressers have expressed concerns about a possible future shortage of staff in the sector as the pandemic has caused a reduction in the number of apprentices.

==== 27 June ====
- New Health Secretary Sajid Javid says he wants to see a return to normal "as quickly as possible".
- Northern Ireland Secretary Brandon Lewis confirms the Department of Health will investigate how footage of former Health Secretary Matt Hancock kissing an aide was leaked to the media.

==== 28 June ====
- Health Secretary Sajid Javid tells MPs the UK government can "see no reason to go beyond" the "target date" for lifting restrictions in England on 19 July, and that although COVID-19 cases have risen the number of related deaths have not.
- A study conducted by Com-Cov indicates that mixing COVID vaccines can provide good protection against the virus.
- Portugal and Malta introduce new rules requiring travellers from the UK to prove they have been vaccinated on arrival. Those who have not been fully vaccinated will be required to quarantine for 14 days.
- The 2021 Wimbledon Championships begins, with a standing ovation from scientists and healthcare workers.
- The 2021 WOMAD festival is cancelled "to guarantee its survival". Organiser Peter Gabriel had hoped the event would receive backing from the government as a test event, and suggested earlier in the month it would have to be cancelled if it did not.

==== 29 June ====
- Hong Kong imposes a ban on all incoming flights from the UK from 1 July to curb the spread of Indian variant COVID, though flights from Hong Kong to the UK are not affected.
- Police are reportedly investigating a video that appears to show England's Chief Medical Officer, Professor Chris Whitty being harassed by two men in a London park.
- Research by Cambridge University Hospitals NHS Foundation Trust shows the quality of masks worn by healthcare workers is a factor in determining their risk of catching COVID.
- A BBC survey highlights the difficulties faced by people with disabilities during the pandemic, with many saying vital medical treatment was delayed because of the pandemic.
- Scotland's Health Secretary, Humza Yousaf, announces that the ban on non-essential travel between Scotland and the north west of England will be lifted from midnight.

==== 30 June ====
- The NHS is given the green light to plan for a winter vaccination programme involving flu jabs and a third COVID injection for around 30 million people. With a bigger than usual flu season expected, the programme will involve all adults over 50, and anyone else who qualifies for a flu jab because of ongoing health issues.

== See also ==
- Timeline of the COVID-19 pandemic in the United Kingdom (January–June 2020)
- Timeline of the COVID-19 pandemic in the United Kingdom (July–December 2020)
- Timeline of the COVID-19 pandemic in the United Kingdom (July–December 2021)
- Timeline of the COVID-19 pandemic in the United Kingdom (January–June 2022)
- Timeline of the COVID-19 pandemic in the United Kingdom (July–December 2022)
- Timeline of the COVID-19 pandemic in the United Kingdom (2023)
- Timeline of the COVID-19 pandemic in the United Kingdom (2024)
- Timeline of the COVID-19 pandemic in England (2021)
- Timeline of the COVID-19 pandemic in Scotland (2021)
- Timeline of the COVID-19 pandemic in Wales (2021)
- Timeline of the COVID-19 pandemic in Northern Ireland (2021)
- History of the COVID-19 pandemic in the United Kingdom
- COVID-19 vaccination in the United Kingdom
