= Health Advisory and Recovery Team =

British antivaccine pressure group

- Abbreviation: HART
- Formation: January 2021
- Spokespeople: John Lee, Gordon Hughes, Ros Jones
- Website: www.hartgroup.org

The Health Advisory and Recovery Team (also HART or HART Group) is a British pressure group opposed to COVID-19 mitigation measures and COVID-19 vaccines.

== History and activities ==
The group was formed in January 2021. It describes itself as aiming to "provide relevant scientific evidence in accessible forms, for a variety of audiences".

An article in the Daily Dot said that the bland self-description was a "façade" and that group members were engaged with COVID-19 conspiracy theories: transcripts of chat sessions between members obtained by DDoSecrets entertained the notion that the COVID-19 pandemic might have been planned, and contained exchanges about Bill Gates, George Soros, and The Great Reset.

A BBC News review of the chat transcripts found that HART was using other named groups to disseminate its misinformation. Messages that were deemed "too inflammatory" for HART were put out under the aegis of the UK Medical Freedom Alliance, while antivaccine messaging was coordinated with the British Ivermectin Recommendation and Development Group to make it appear that "two groups of professionals [were] agreeing with each other".

In March 2021, the group issued a document seeking to persuade the British government not to pass COVID-19 legislation, suggesting that a large increase in deaths had been caused by the COVID-19 vaccination programme. Jeremy Brown of the Joint Committee on Vaccination and Immunisation said the document was "ridiculous" since the vaccines in question had an established safety profile, and virologist Jonathan Ball said it showed a "blatant disregard for the facts" and was "irresponsible in the extreme".

As of August 2021 the group had 30,000 twitter followers and 5,000 Facebook followers.

== See also ==
- COVID Recovery Group
- Front Line COVID-19 Critical Care Alliance
- Great Barrington declaration
- Robert F. Kennedy Jr
- World Council for Health
