= Jonathan Ball =

Jonathan Ball may refer to:

== People ==
- Jonathan Ball (footballer) (born 1985), Bermudian footballer
- Jonathan Ball (architect) (born 1947), British co-founder of the Eden Project
- Jonathan Ball (virologist), professor of molecular virology

== Other uses ==
- Jonathan Ball Publishers, a South African publishing house owned by Media24
