= World Doctors Alliance =

Anti-vaccine and COVID-19 denial conspiracy theorists

- Formation: 2020
- Founder: Mohammad Iqbal Adil
- Type: Pseudo-non-profit organization
- Fields: Medical conspiracy theory

The World Doctors Alliance (WDA) is a pseudo-medical organization of anti-vaccine activists, COVID-19 denialists and conspiracy theorists which was established in May 2020 by Mohammad Iqbal Adil.

The WDA has been found to be a major source of disinformation regarding the COVID-19 pandemic and is a coalition-partner of the similar anti-vaccine activism group World Council for Health.

== Claims ==
The World Doctors Alliance has made various false claims regarding COVID-19 and vaccines which have been universally rejected by the legitimate medical community. Claims are often described as "absurd, inarticulate, arguments poorly formed, sentimental and failing to reference any evidence".

== Members ==
The World Doctors Alliance is made up of twelve public figures who have been either discredited in their fields, deemed unqualified to comment on issues related to virology or vaccines, or banned from practicing medicine due to misconduct.

1. Founding member Mohammad Iqbal Adil was suspended from teaching medicine in the UK in June 2020 after an investigation by the General Medical Council found he had been posting videos on social media claiming that COVID-19 was a hoax being spread by elites to control society. In 2023, Adil was struck from the medical register due to continuing to spread misinformation and is no longer permitted to practice medicine nor use the title of 'Doctor'.
2. Dolores Cahill is a former professor of immunology at University College Dublin. She was asked to resign as vice chair of the Innovative Medicines Initiative in June 2020 after making misleading medical claims regarding COVID-19. She was later forced to resign as chair of the Irish Freedom Party after "promising to debunk the narrative of the pandemic" in March 2021. Cahill's claim that COVID-19 is hoax has been rejected by the legitimate medical community.
3. Zac Cox, a holistic dentist, has similarly claimed COVID-19 is a hoax and compared protesting against the pandemic to be similar to the plight his grandfather experienced fighting against the Nazi regime.
4. Psychiatrist Andrew Kaufman was described as "calmly denying reality" by McGill University for his role in spreading misinformation regarding the COVID-19 pandemic and claiming that a COVID-19 vaccine would make humans "genetically modified organisms". Kaufman has also rejected the existence of the viruses behind the Common cold, Polio and HIV/AIDS and has said that "demon possession may actually be a factor in some mental illness".
5. Heiko Schoening was arrested in August 2020 at the Trafalgar Freedom Rally which aimed to oppose a second lockdown in the UK and oppose vaccination efforts. Schoening has claimed "the pandemic is a hoax".
6. Heinrich Fiechtner is a former political member of Alternative for Germany, a German nationalist and right-wing populist political party. Fiechtner was expelled from the Stuttgart State Parliament in 2021 by the police after claiming that COVID-19 is a hoax. He has accused those promoting the COVID-19 vaccine as being "disciple[s] of Josef Mengele".
7. Scott Jensen has claimed that COVID-19 figures have been inflated for monetary gain, a statement which Politifact cited as a major contributor to their "Lie of the Year 2020: Coronavirus downplay and denial".
8. Elke De Clerk is a general practitioner. She has claimed that "we do not have a pandemic" and calls COVID-19 a "normal flu virus". Both claims have been rejected by the World Health Organization, Centers for Disease Control and Prevention and the legitimate medical community. De Klerk also claimed that people who take the COVID-19 vaccine will "officially become the property of Microsoft" and that COVID-19 testing PCR kits were "a kind of nasal vaccination". De Klerk has stated she no longer practices as a doctor and is working to "create new earth".
9. Mikael Nordfors was barred from practicing medicine in Denmark after being investigated for malpractice and suggesting alternative medicine could be a potential cure for COVID-19. He has also been investigated for eleven cases of treating patients with Ozone therapy.
10. Hilde De Smet has claimed that face masks cause an excess of carbon-dioxide, leading to neurological damage. This claim has been rejected by the medical community.
11. Vernon Coleman is an English conspiracy theorist who has claimed COVID-19 is a hoax, that vaccines are dangerous and that face masks cause cancer. Such claims have been repeatedly debunked by the medical community.
12. Johan Denis was suspended in January 2021 as a general practitioner for claiming COVID-19 was a hoax and for giving patients a "mask-exemption certificate" on demand.

== See also ==
- COVID-19 misinformation
- Medical malpractice
- Quackery
- Robert F. Kennedy Jr.
