= Heinrich Fiechtner =

German conspiracy theorist, haematologist and internal oncologist

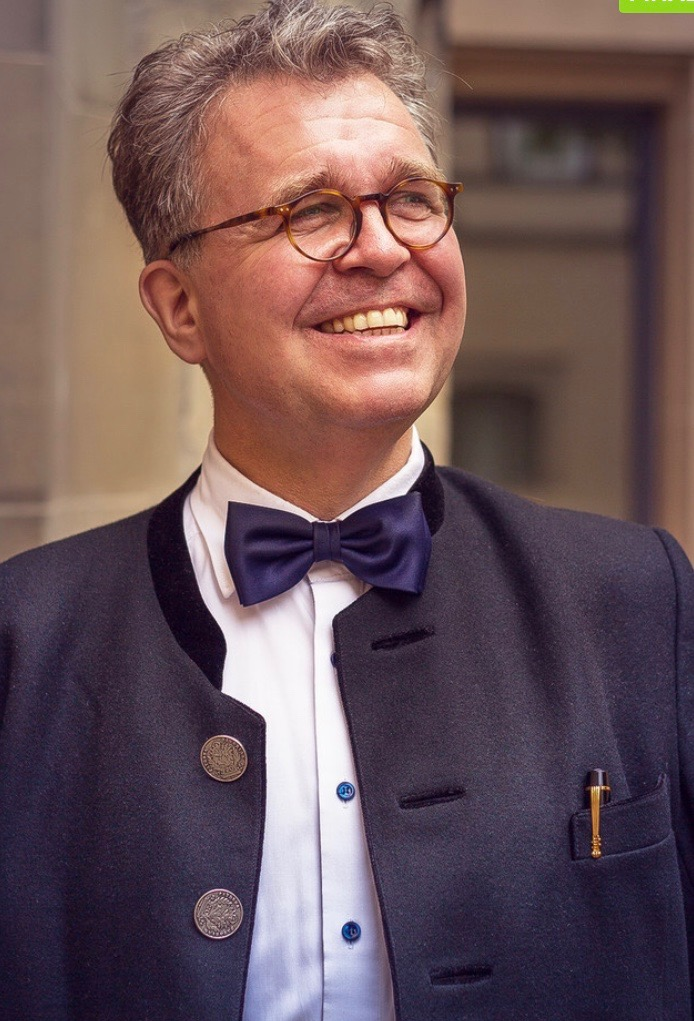

Member of the Landtag of Baden-Württemberg
- In office 2016–2021

Personal details
- Born: 29 September 1960
- Party: (non-party, formerly AfD, CDU and FDP).

Heinrich Ekkehard Fiechtner (born 29 September 1960 in Stuttgart-Bad Cannstatt) is a German conspiracy theorist, haematologist and internal oncologist, palliative medicine specialist and politician (non-party, formerly AfD, CDU and FDP).

From 2016 to 2021 he was a member of the state parliament of Baden-Württemberg for Alternative for Germany (AfD). He resigned from the party and parliamentary group at the end of November 2017, because he felt there were too many individuals holding antisemitic sentiments within the party. He identifies as a supporter of Israel and Germany's Jewish population. Fiechtner and AfD legislator Wolfgang Gedeon, both doctors, exchanged certificates for exemption from the mask requirement in a video in 2020.

Fiechtner has been described as a radical critic of public health measures against COVID-19, including mask mandates, tests, and lockdowns. He refused to receive vaccinations for COVID-19, and was a member of a pseudoscientific medical group "World Doctors Alliance" which was found to be spreading false and conspiratorial claims about COVID-19.

Fiechtner was expelled from the Stuttgart State Parliament in 2021 by the police after rebuking members of the other parties for being responsible for a riot during the night in the center of Stuttgart. Later, he won a related case on partial claims before the State Constitutional Court of Baden Wuerttemberg.
