= COVID Recovery Group =

Group of Conservative MPs in the United Kingdom

- Abbreviation: CRG
- Formation: 10 November 2020; 5 years ago
- Dissolved: October 25, 2022; 4 years ago
- Owner: United Kingdom Government
- Chairman: Mark Harper
- Deputy Chairman: Steve Baker
- Parent organisation: Conservative Party

The COVID Recovery Group (CRG) was an informal group of Conservative MPs in the United Kingdom who opposed the UK government's decision to introduce a second period of lockdown measures for England during the COVID-19 pandemic, and who voted against the restrictions. The group was chaired by Mark Harper, a former Chief Whip, with Steve Baker as Deputy Chair.

== History ==
=== Formation ===
Established on 10 November 2020, the group's aim is to challenge the use of blanket lockdown measures, and argue for a different approach to dealing with the pandemic.

The group was reported to have been formed by fifty MPs, but as of 11 November was reportedly composed of seventy MPs.

The chief demand of the CRG on 10 November was that "ministers undertake and publish a full cost-benefit analysis of restrictions on a regional basis looking at the economic and health costs of a lockdown; "MPs must be in a position to assess the relative health implications on both sides of the argument of repeated restrictions, with a view to removing them immediately if it cannot be proved that they are saving more lives than they cost."

The second demand is "for ministers to end a monopoly on advice of government scientists, such as SAGE UK, and allow them to be challenged by competitive, multi-disciplinary expert groups; "The Government should publish the models that inform policies so they can be reviewed by the public."

And also "to improve the measures we already have to tackle the virus, including significantly boosting the performance of NHS Test and Trace by shifting resources to local public health teams to lead contact tracing and break the chain of transmission."

=== First steps ===
On 22 November 2020, the group wrote a letter to the Prime Minister, Boris Johnson, saying they would only support further lockdown measures if the government published analysis showing that benefits of the lockdown exceeded the costs stating that there was a risk that the costs of the lockdown exceeded any benefit and that the Government had a burden to show that any restrictions were necessary.

On 1 December 2020, Downing Street was trying to corral the group in anticipation of a vote it expected would be held later that day, in expectation that it would roll out to the general population the tiered measures on 2 December, the day on which the restrictions then in place were set to expire. The publication by HMG that was demanded by the CRG on 10 November was derided by many MPs as insufficient. Harper said: "The Government's analysis seems to be collapsing under the glare of scrutiny. Before the current lockdown, incorrect death and hospital capacity modelling was leaked into the public domain to justify it. We have asked repeatedly for the information that vindicates these hospital projections and it has not been forthcoming. We are now seeing that, once again, the wheels are coming off the Government's arguments."

Newton Abbott MP Anne-Marie Morris said: "There is nothing new in this document – it's just a rehash of data that has been published before. No attempt has been made to model the impact on the economy in the way that they have modelled the impact the tiers will have on Covid infections. I cannot support the Government in [the 1 December] vote, and everyone I know who has read the document is saying the same."

Labour MPs were expected to abstain, and the Daily Telegraph published an editorial in which the economic forecast demanded by the CRG was described as a "disappointing dossier", and a "thin piece of analysis", which contained "fantasy counterfactual" and "questionable assumptions". "Crucially, it fails to address the relative economic impact of being placed in different tiers... Before [the restrictions] are enacted, the public is entitled to a more honest assessment of the consequences than ministers have deigned to give them thus far." Overall, 55 Conservative MPs voted against the government, 16 did not vote for it. Former Labour leader Jeremy Corbyn and 14 Labour MPs voted against the government.

=== 2021 actions ===
In January, the CRG told Boris Johnson that his "leadership will be on the table" if he did not publish an exit strategy for the current lockdown.

The CRG wrote a letter to the Prime Minister in February 2021, backed by 63 MPs, calling for the lifting of all lockdown restrictions by the end of April, when all adults over 50 or with underlying health conditions were projected to have been vaccinated. They argued that once all priority groups had been vaccinated "there is no justification for any legislative restrictions to remain". Harper said that the dates were not arbitrary, but based on the government's projected vaccine rollout. Their request was rejected by the government.

== See also ==
- Health Advisory and Recovery Team
- World Council for Health
