= Antivirals Taskforce (UK) =

UK governing body

The Antivirals Taskforce is a body established in the United Kingdom in April 2021 by the Second Johnson ministry in order to investigate potential treatments for COVID-19 that could be taken at home. The taskforce will oversee the work and potential trials of such treatments, which would be given to a person upon their testing positive for COVID-19 in a bid to reduce the spread of the virus and speed up recovery time. Its establishment was announced by Prime Minister Boris Johnson at a press conference at 10 Downing Street on 20 April 2021, with Johnson expressing his hope that a home treatment could be available as early as Autumn 2021.

The announcement of its establishment was broadly welcomed by leading UK scientists, although more clarity on the type of treatments was sought by them. Dr Stephen Griffin, Associate Professor at the University of Leeds School of Medicine said: "It would be useful to understand whether this initiative is primarily to repurpose existing medications for COVID treatment clinical trials, or to develop novel treatments through supporting fundamental and translational research".
