= Jonathan Ball (footballer) =

Bermudian footballer

Johnny Ball
Personal information
- Full name: Jonathan Ball
- Date of birth: January 6, 1985 (age 41)
- Place of birth: Bermuda
- Height: 6 ft 1 in (1.85 m)
- Position: Defender

Team information
- Current team: PHC Zebras

Senior career*
Years	Team	Apps	(Gls)
2007–2008	PHC Zebras		
2008–2009	Bermuda Hogges	17	(3)
2010–	PHC Zebras		

International career^{‡}
2007–2008	Bermuda	4	(0)
- * Club domestic league appearances and goals as of 11 October 2009 ‡ National team caps and goals as of 23 December 2015

Jonathan Ball (born January 6, 1985) is a Bermudian football player, who currently plays for PHC Zebras.

== Club career ==
Ball has been part of the Bermuda Hogges squad in the USL Second Division since 2008.

In November 2013, Ball was voted PHC Zebras' president while confirming he would carry on playing for the club.

== International career ==
He made his debut for Bermuda in a December 2007 friendly match against Saint Kitts & Nevis and earned a total of 4 caps, scoring no goals.

His final international match was a June 2008 friendly against Barbados.
