= Adam Finn =

- Education: University of Oxford; University of Cambridge; University of London
- Medical career
- Profession: Paediatrician
- Field: Paediatrics; Vaccinology; Infectious diseases
- Institutions: University of Bristol

Adam Hugh Roderick Finn is professor of paediatrics at the University of Bristol and head of the Bristol Children's Vaccine Centre. He has been chairman of the World Health Organization (WHO) European Technical Advisory Group of Experts (ETAGE) on Immunization since 2011 and is an ex-officio member of the WHO Strategic Advisory Group of Experts.

He is a member of the British Department of Health Joint Committee on Vaccination and Immunisation (JCVI) and in 2015 was elected president of the European Society for Paediatric Infectious Diseases (ESPID).

Finn was a senior lecturer at the University of Sheffield for 10 years before joining the University of Bristol as professor of paediatrics and head of the Bristol Children's Vaccine Centre.
