= Jonathan Ball (virologist) =

British virologist

- Education: Bristol Polytechnic; University of Warwick
- Scientific career
- Workplaces: Centre for Applied Microbiology & Research, Porton Down; University of Nottingham
- Thesis: Molecular and biological characterisation of the human immunodeficiency virus type 1 (1994)
- Website: Prof Jonathan Ball

Jonathan Kelvin Ball is professor of molecular virology and Deputy Vice-Chancelor at the Liverpool School of Tropical Medicine and Honorary Professor at the University of Nottingham. His research relates to emerging viruses, viral vaccines and treatments, and blood-borne infections. He was the founding director of the Centre for Global Virus Research at the University of Nottingham.

He graduated from Bristol Polytechnic with a BSc in Applied Biological Sciences in 1987 and completed his PhD in virology at the University of Warwick in 1994, he competed on the 2019 University Challenge Christmas series for the latter institution, and was the subject of the BBC Radio 4 programme The Life Scientific, which was first broadcast on 30 July 2019.
