= World Council for Health =

Anti-vaccination group

- Formation: September 2021; 4 years ago
- Type: Nonprofit
- Headquarters: Bath, England
- Website: https://worldcouncilforhealth.org/

The World Council for Health is a pseudo-medical organisation dedicated to spreading misinformation to discourage COVID-19 vaccination, and promoting fake COVID-19 treatments.

The organization's online appearance is that of a mainstream health organization. It appears to have been formed in September 2021 and its published leadership contains people which an Australian Associated Press fact check described as "figures who have promoted unfounded conspiracy theories". The group was founded by Jennifer A. Hibberd and Tess Lawrie, an obstetrician and founder of the "BIRD Group", which erroneously promotes ivermectin as a COVID-19 treatment.

The World Council for Health is affiliated with Children's Health Defense, an antivaccine association led by Robert F. Kennedy Jr.

== Activities ==
The World Council for Health promotes misinformation linking COVID-19 vaccination with death. In 2021 the group promoted claims on social media of a "multi-system inflammatory condition" which they called "Post-COVID injection syndrome". The condition is however not recognized in medical science, and there is no evidence any such condition is caused by vaccination.

In May 2022 the group was involved in a conference in Bath, England which Vice World News described as a meeting of the "biggest names in the global anti-vax and coronavirus conspiracy scenes". The local authorities withdrew permission to use their venues after reviewing the publicity of the World Council for Health falsely claiming that COVID-19 vaccines were unsafe.

In July 2022, the US-cardiologist Peter McCullough, an anti-vaccine advocate, falsely claimed that vaccinations have been globally recalled due to more than 40,000 deaths worldwide at the request of the World Council for Health. However, the Food and Drug Administration had not listed any recalls for the four COVID-19 vaccines authorised in the US, as confirmed in an email by Abby Capobianco, an agency spokesperson, to AFP.

The UK cardiologist Aseem Malhotra called in September 2022 for the "immediate and complete suspension of Covid-19 vaccine" in a press conference with the World Council for Health, because of "a greater risk of serious adverse events from the vaccines than being hospitalised from COVID-19", repeating his conclusions in a narrative review article in the Journal of Insulin resistance. However, his findings were based on anecdotal evidence, low-quality studies and cherry-picking, where mainly studies that suggested a negative effect of COVID-19 vaccines were cited, and the broader body of evidence showing that the vaccines are safe and effective was not acknowledged.

The group promotes ivermectin as a treatment for COVID-19, although research has determined it is ineffective for this purpose.
