= Mount Carmel (disambiguation) =

Mount Carmel is a coastal mountain range in northern Israel.

Mount Carmel may refer also to:

== Places in North America ==
- Mount Carmel, Hamden, a neighborhood of Hamden, Connecticut
- Mount Carmel, Florida
- Mount Carmel, Illinois, a city and county seat
- Mount Carmel, Indiana, Franklin County, a town
- Mount Carmel, Washington County, Indiana, an unincorporated community
- Mount Carmel, Kentucky, an unincorporated community
- Mount Carmel, Mississippi
- Mount Carmel, a township and community in Cavalier County, North Dakota
- Mount Carmel, Ohio, a census-designated place
- Mount Carmel, Pennsylvania, a borough
- Mount Carmel Shrine (Saskatchewan), a landmark in Canada
- Mount Carmel, South Carolina, a census-designated place
- Mount Carmel, Tennessee, a town
- Mount Carmel, Utah, now part of Orderville
- Mount Carmel Junction, Utah, now part of Orderville
- Mount Carmel, West Virginia, an unincorporated community
- Mount Carmel District, a neighborhood of Poughkeepsie, New York
- Mount Carmel Precinct, Wabash County, Illinois

== Health care ==
- Mount Carmel Health System, in Ohio, U.S.
- Mount Carmel Community Hospital, in Dublin, Ireland
- Mount Carmel Medical Group, a health care organization in Ireland
- Mt. Carmel Regional Medical Center, a hospital in Pittsburg, Kansas, U.S.
- Mount Carmel Psychiatric Hospital, a mental health hospital in Attard, Malta

== Others ==
- Mount Carmel Catholic College for Girls, a Catholic specialist secondary school in London
- Mount Carmel Cemetery (Hillside, Illinois), near Chicago, Illinois
- Mount Carmel Center, a home of the Branch Davidians in Waco, Texas
- Mount Carmel Shrine (Saskatchewan)
- Mount Carmel, also known as Sleeping Giant, a small mountain in Connecticut
- Mount Carmel or Karmilio Oros, a peak at the southern end of the Athos peninsula in Greece

== See also ==
- Mount Carmel High School (disambiguation)
- Mount Carmel College (disambiguation)
- Mount Carmel, Ontario (disambiguation)
- Mount Carmel-Mitchells Brook-St. Catherines
- Our Lady of Mount Carmel (disambiguation)
