= Irish Lebanese Cultural Foundation =

Irish non-profit organization

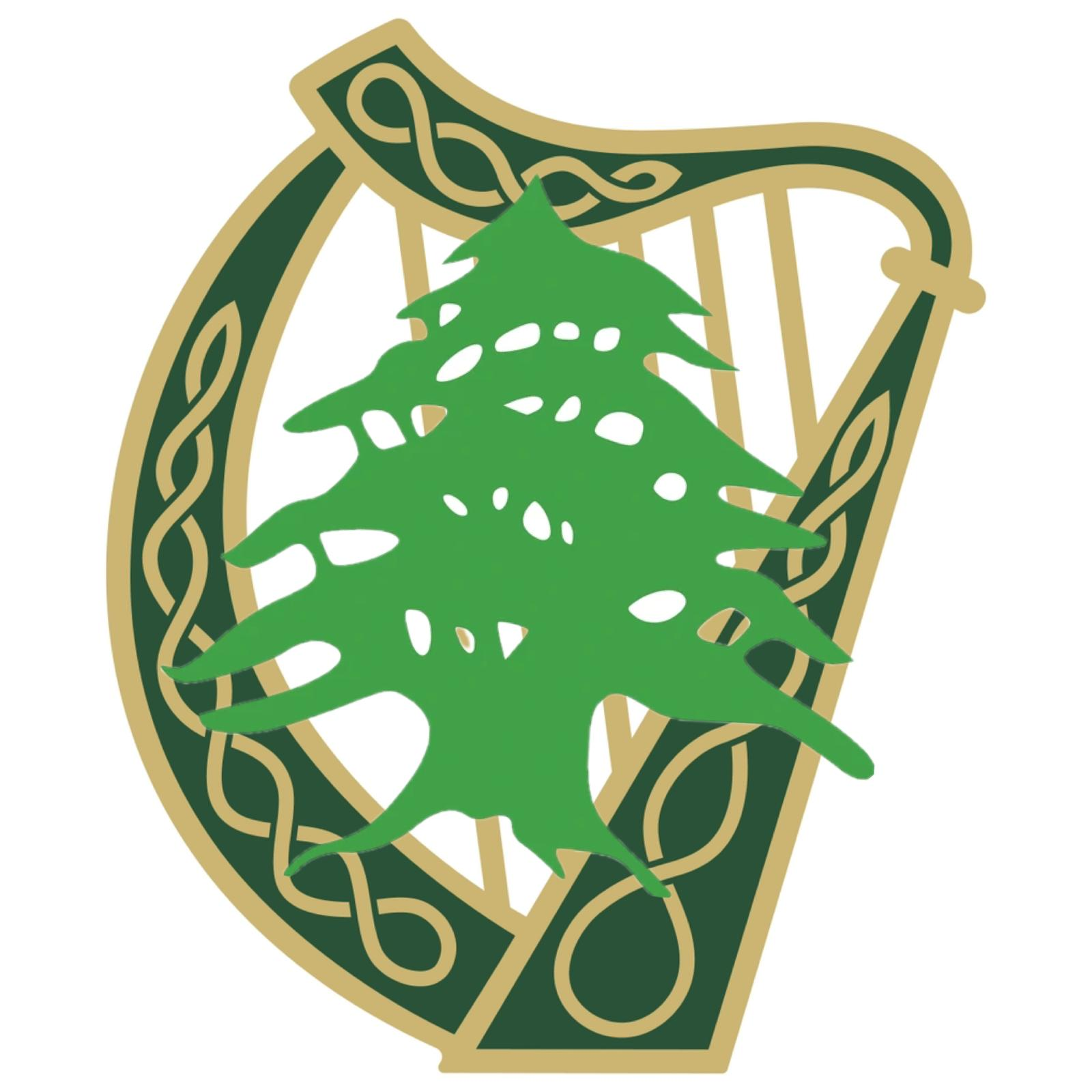
- Founded: 2001
- Founder: Guy Jones
- Type: Non-profit organization
- Purpose: Cultural, sports, and artistic exchange between Ireland and Lebanon
- Location: Kilkenny, Ireland
- Key people: Guy Jones (Chairman and Founder)
- Website: irishlebanese.com

The Irish Lebanese Cultural Foundation (ILCF) is a non-profit organization based in Kilkenny, Ireland, that aims to foster cultural, sports, and artistic ties between Ireland and Lebanon. The foundation was founded in 2001 by Guy Jones (also known as Guy Younes), a native of Tannourine, Lebanon.

== History ==
The Irish Lebanese Cultural Foundation was established in 2001 to create cultural links between Ireland and Lebanon at a time when there were few formal connections between the two countries. The year 2001 coincided with the return of Irish troops who had been serving as UNIFIL peacekeepers in Lebanon since 1978. According to founder Guy Jones, the end of Irish participation in UNIFIL marked a surprising severing of ties between the two countries, as no other social or cultural links existed at the time. Jones took the initiative to create a cultural bridge to honour the Irish who had died in the service of peace in Lebanon, and the foundation grew from there. The organization was created to promote Lebanese culture in Ireland through cultural activities rather than through political discourse. Jones, a mechanical engineer who emigrated to Ireland in 1999, established the foundation to create a positive cultural environment for his family and to highlight the shared history between Ireland and Lebanon.

Over time, the foundation's cultural diplomacy drew considerable interest from former Irish UNIFIL servicemen, who remain emotionally attached to their memories of Lebanon and its people. Ireland is home to a Lebanese community of over 3,000 people, many of whom arrived through various waves of migration over several decades.

The foundation has been particularly active in organizing commemorative events and cultural initiatives. In 2005, it organized the first St. Patrick's Day Parade in Beirut, Lebanon, celebrating Irish tradition in the Middle East. The organization has also worked on environmental initiatives, including a tree-planting campaign that began in 2004 and aimed to plant 47 trees.

== Activities and initiatives ==
=== Humanitarian assistance ===
In 2006, following the month-long conflict between Israel and Hezbollah in July and August, the foundation organized the donation of approximately 100 hospital beds from Ireland to war-ravaged towns in southern Lebanon. The beds were sourced from the Aut Even Hospital in Kilkenny and shipped to provide medical assistance to Lebanese communities affected by the conflict.

=== Cultural events ===
The foundation has organized numerous cultural events promoting Lebanese and Irish heritage. In 2008, the foundation brought the Irish singing group "The Boatmen" to Lebanon to celebrate St. Patrick's Day according to Irish tradition. The group performed in Lebanon as part of the foundation's efforts to promote cultural exchange between the two countries.

In the same year, the foundation hosted a photo exhibition in Leixlip, County Kildare, celebrating Lebanese Independence Day with members of the Lebanese community in Ireland. The exhibition featured photographs of Beirut taken by Irish artist Shauna O'Boyle since 2000 and was attended by Lebanese Ambassador HE Enaam Osseiran. Speaking at the event, Guy Jones noted that Ireland and Lebanon have enjoyed close links since Lebanon achieved independence from France in 1943, and remarked that "After many years of conflict, daily life is slowly returning to normal." Earlier that year, the foundation also paid tribute to Irish UN peacekeepers who had served in Lebanon since 1978.

The foundation has also played a role in promoting Lebanese commerce in Ireland. Through the organisation of wine tastings and by assisting producers in promoting their brands, the foundation helped introduce Lebanese wines to the Irish market, where they have become a popular seller.

In 2023, the foundation organized Lebanese pop-up dining experiences at the Savour Kilkenny food festival, with Guy Jones serving as head chef, introducing visitors to authentic Lebanese cuisine.

=== Commemorative ceremonies ===
The foundation regularly organizes commemorative ceremonies at St Mary's International Garden of Remembrance in Thurles, County Tipperary. These ceremonies honor lives lost in conflicts affecting Lebanon and promote peace and reconciliation. The foundation's chairman has led ceremonies attended by international ambassadors, members of the Irish Defence Forces, and members of the Garda Síochána.

In 2006, following the Israel-Hezbollah conflict, the foundation organized a two-minute silence at Dublin's Garden of Remembrance to commemorate the victims of the conflict. Simultaneously, a similar ceremony was held at St Mary's Garden of Remembrance in Thurles as a mark of respect. St Mary's Garden contains the only Lebanese flag in Ireland and features memorials to former Irish UN soldiers who died on tours of duty in Lebanon, as well as a plaque commemorating assassinated Lebanese prime minister Rafic Hariri. The foundation unveiled a mosaic plaque from Lebanon at St Mary's Garden as the centerpiece of a Community Wall of Remembrance, with Guy Jones overseeing the unveiling attended by hundreds of ex-servicemen and UN veterans from Ireland and Britain. Rafic Hariri was posthumously honored with the Tipperary International Peace Award.

=== Cedar Awards ===
The Irish Lebanese Cultural Foundation established the Cedar Awards tradition to honor remarkable personalities of the Lebanese community and cultural achievers who have impacted the promulgation of Lebanese heritage or the promotion of Lebanon. The awards consist of planting a cedar tree in Mount Lebanon in the recipient's honor, with a certificate containing the GPS coordinates presented at a private ceremony held in Kilkenny.

In 2023, the foundation presented Cedar Awards to Chris de Burgh, Philip Beale, Roland Mansour, and Richard Hearns. These individuals were selected by unanimous vote of the ILCF Committee for their significant contributions to Irish-Lebanese cultural exchange and appreciation of Lebanese heritage.

=== Educational and cultural advocacy ===
The foundation has engaged in discussions regarding immigration, integration, and intercultural exchange, leveraging connections with universities and diaspora institutions. The organization serves in consultative roles on these issues within the Lebanese community in Ireland. In 2017, Guy Jones organized an official visit to Lebanon aimed at establishing further educational and cultural links between the National University of Ireland (NUI) and Lebanese University counterparts. As part of these initiatives, Jones has also planned the establishment of an Irish/Lebanese Chamber of Commerce to strengthen economic and business ties between the two countries.

The foundation has also expressed ambitions to expand its educational outreach by presenting the history of the Phoenicians to schools and universities in Ireland, aiming to bring wider awareness to the ancient Mediterranean civilization that predates modern Lebanon.

== Leadership ==
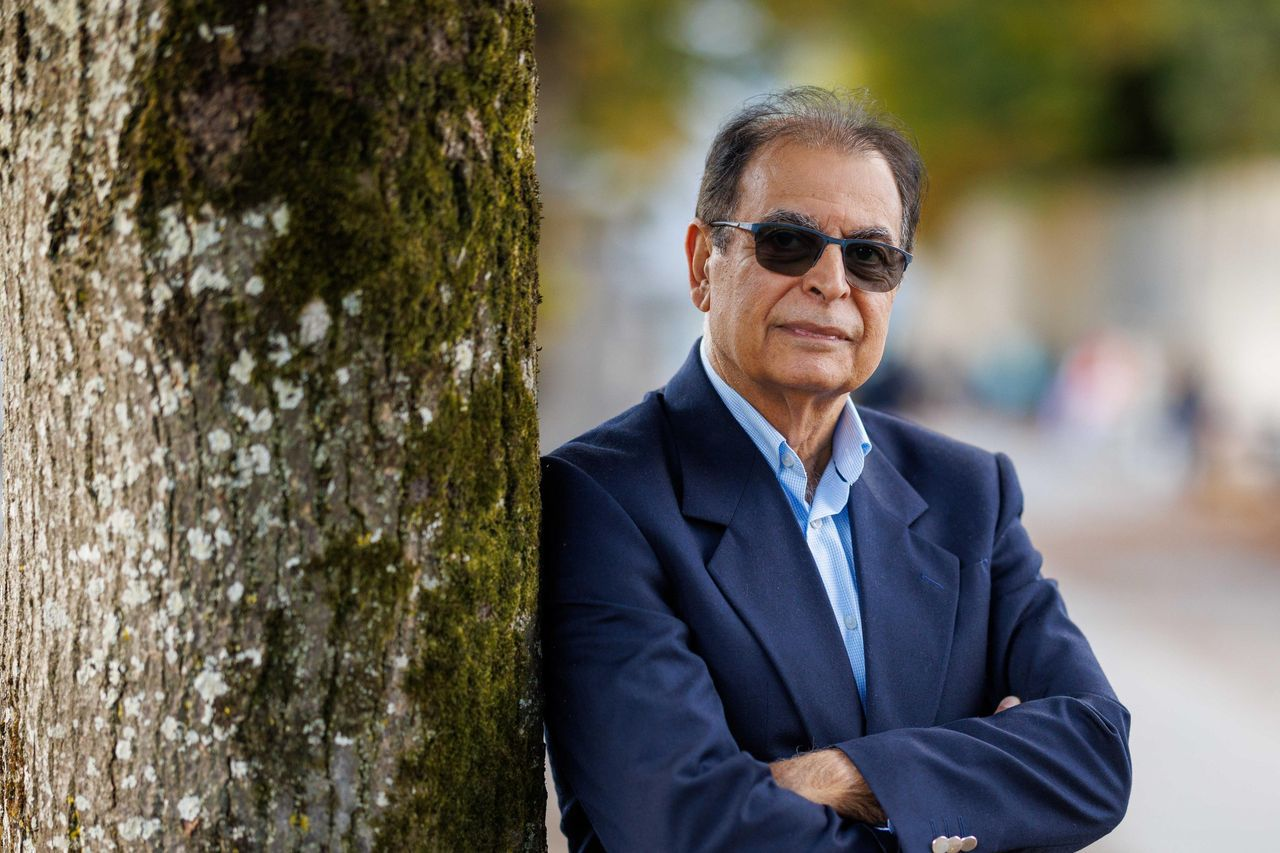
Guy Jones, founder and chairman of the Irish Lebanese Cultural Foundation.

Guy Jones (also known as Guy Younes) serves as the founder and chairman of the Irish Lebanese Cultural Foundation. A native of Tannourine, Lebanon, and a mechanical engineer by training, Jones emigrated to Ireland in 1999 and has worked with Veolia Water Ireland in Kilkenny.

Beyond his role with the foundation, Jones has also been involved with the Kilkenny Taekwondo Club, which he founded, and serves as chairman of the International Taekwondo Institute in Kilkenny, having achieved a 7th Dan Black Belt Kukkiwon certification in 2014.

=== Academic and literary work ===
Jones has pursued academic research on Lebanese literary figures and culture. In 2014, he presented a paper titled "Gibran in Ireland" at the University of Maryland. This academic work explores the Irish connection to Lebanese philosopher and poet Kahlil Gibran. Jones subsequently gave readings based on this research in Kilkenny, including a presentation organized by the Kilkenny Writers' Group at Harry's Bar, Langton's, in April 2014.

Jones's research into the shared history of Ireland and Lebanon led to the writing of his book, The Emerald and the Jewel of Pradishah, which explores the historical connections between the two countries based on findings not previously documented. In 2025, Jones presented the book at the 10th Congress of Writers and Readers for Lebanon, held in Rosario, Argentina — a city of personal significance, as it is the birthplace of his grandfather. The book is scheduled for release in 2026.

== Philosophy and approach ==
Jones has emphasized that the foundation's approach to promoting Lebanon in Ireland is through cultural activities, particularly food and culinary traditions, rather than through political engagement. In a 2023 interview, Jones stated: "In my opinion, cultural diplomacy is the best diplomacy. If I want to promote Lebanon in Ireland, I will promote it this way, by cooking and sharing Lebanese food. I will not go on TV. I will not go on radio. I will not be talking politics. I will not be talking about the Middle East."

== See also ==
- Ireland–Lebanon relations
- Cultural diplomacy
- Kilkenny
- Lebanese diaspora
