= Mont-Carmel =

Mont-Carmel may refer to:

- Mont-Carmel, Quebec
- Mont-Carmel, Prince Edward Island

== See also ==
- Mount Carmel (disambiguation)
