= List of Alpha Lambda Delta chapters =

Alpha Lambda Delta is an honor society for first-year college students. In the following list of chapters, active chapters are indicated in bold and inactive chapters are in italics.

Charter date and range	Institution	Location	Status	Ref.
May 31, 1924	University of Illinois Urbana-Champaign	Champaign, Illinois	Active	
May 20, 1926	Purdue University	West Lafayette, Indiana	Active	
April 2, 1927	DePauw University	Greencastle, Indiana	Inactive	
March 24, 1928	University of Michigan	Ann Arbor, Michigan	Inactive	
April 15, 1929	University of Oklahoma	Norman, Oklahoma	Active	
1930	George Washington University	Washington, D.C.	Inactive	
May 16, 1930	University of Mississippi	Oxford, Mississippi	Active	
May 17, 1930	University of Alabama	Tuscaloosa, Alabama	Active	
May 24, 1930	Penn State University Park	State College, Pennsylvania	Inactive	
May 27, 1930	University of South Dakota	Vermillion, South Dakota	Inactive	
January 10, 1931	Indiana University Bloomington	Bloomington, Indiana	Active	
January 23, 1931	Doane University	Crete, Nebraska	Active	
January 24, 1931	University of Nebraska–Lincoln	Lincoln, Nebraska	Active	
January 24, 1931	University of Nebraska Omaha	Omaha, Nebraska	Inactive	
April 11, 1931	Washington University in St. Louis	St. Louis, Missouri	Inactive	
May 15, 1931	University of Cincinnati	Cincinnati, Ohio	Active	
June 13, 1931	Southern Methodist University	Dallas, Texas	Active	
December 12, 1931	Montana State University	Bozeman, Montana	Active	
February 10, 1932	University of Maryland, College Park	College Park, Maryland	Active	
February 27, 1932	University of Tennessee	Knoxville, Tennessee	Inactive	
March 22, 1933	Northwestern University	Evanston, Illinois	Inactive	
April 29, 1933 – 19xx ?; 1960	Texas Woman's University	Denton, Texas	Active	
May 17, 1933	University of Utah	Salt Lake City, Utah	Inactive	
May 20, 1933	Oregon State University	Corvallis, Oregon	Inactive	
May 22, 1933 – xxxx ?; Fall 2021	University of Idaho	Moscow, Idaho	Active	
November 10, 1933	Louisiana State University	Baton Rouge, Louisiana	Active	
February 28, 1934	Lake Forest College	Lake Forest, Illinois	Inactive	
April 27, 1934	Birmingham–Southern College	Birmingham, Alabama	Inactive	
May 19, 1934	University of Georgia	Athens, Georgia	Active	
May 10, 1935	University of Denver	Denver, Colorado	Inactive	
December 13, 1935	University of Texas at Austin	Austin, Texas	Active	
April 24, 1936	University of Montana	Missoula, Montana	Active	
May 22, 1936	Seton Hill University	Greensburg, Pennsylvania	Active	
November 17, 1937	Wittenberg University	Springfield, Ohio	Active	
December 6, 1937	University of the Incarnate Word	San Antonio, Texas	Active	
April 2, 1938	Coe College	Cedar Rapids, Iowa	Active	
May 7, 1938	Drake University	Des Moines, Iowa	Inactive	
May 11, 1938	Bucknell University	Lewisburg, Pennsylvania	Active	
February 27, 1939	University of Montevallo	Montevallo, Alabama	Active	
May 23, 1939	University of Southern California	Los Angeles, California	Active	
May 14, 1940	Albion College	Albion, Michigan	Inactive	
May 19, 1940	University of Kentucky	Lexington, Kentucky	Active	
December 10, 1940	University of California, Los Angeles	Los Angeles, California	Active	
May 28, 1941	University of Akron	Akron, Ohio	Active	
October 14, 1941	Ohio University	Athens, Ohio	Active	
October 24, 1941	Florida State University	Tallahassee, Florida	Inactive	
March 5, 1942	Kalamazoo College	Kalamazoo, Michigan	Active	
1942–xxxx ?; April 22, 2012	University of Arkansas	Fayetteville, Arkansas	Active	
May 19, 1945	Ohio State University	Columbus, Ohio	Active	
November 9, 1945	University of Iowa	Iowa City, Iowa	Inactive	
March 20, 1947	University of Tennessee at Chattanooga	Chattanooga, Tennessee	Active	
March 26, 1947	University of Mount Union	Alliance, Ohio	Active	
April 18, 1948	Willamette University	Salem, Oregon	Inactive	
January 1, 1949	Texas Tech University	Lubbock, Texas	Active	
February 28, 1949	Butler University	Indianapolis, Indiana	Active	
1949–xxxx?; March 13, 2011	Drury University	Springfield, Missouri	Active	
April 9, 1949	Illinois Wesleyan University	Bloomington, Illinois	Inactive	
December 15, 1949	Lindenwood University	St. Charles, Missouri	Active	
February 20, 1950	University of Miami	Coral Gables, Florida	Inactive	
February 22, 1950	University of Florida	Gainesville, Florida	Inactive	
April 27, 1950	University of Science and Arts of Oklahoma	Chickasha, Oklahoma	Active	(Note: The chapter was formed at the Oklahoma College for Women, now the University of Science and Arts of Oklahoma.)
May 29, 1950	Brigham Young University	Provo, Utah	Inactive	
December 15, 1950	University of North Dakota	Grand Forks, North Dakota	Inactive	
January 19, 1951	Bradley University	Peoria, Illinois	Inactive	
April 25, 1951	University of Vermont	Burlington, Vermont	Inactive	
December 2, 1951	Beloit College	Beloit, Wisconsin	Inactive	
January 30, 1952	University of North Texas	Denton, Texas	Active	
February 2, 1952	Auburn University	Auburn, Alabama	Inactive	
January 20, 1953	Utah State University	Logan, Utah	Active	
January 22, 1953	University of Oregon	Eugene, Oregon	Inactive	
March 13, 1953	Marshall University	Huntington, West Virginia	Inactive	
December 16, 1953	Hanover College	Hanover, Indiana	Active	
March 13, 1954	Alfred University	Alfred, New York	Inactive	
March 30, 1955	Georgia State University	Atlanta, Georgia	Active	
May 8, 1955	Trinity University	San Antonio, Texas	Active	
May 16, 1955	Valparaiso University	Valparaiso, Indiana	Inactive	
January 5, 1956	San Diego State University	San Diego, California	Inactive	
January 10, 1956	MacMurray College	Jacksonville, Illinois	Inactive	(Note: The college closed in 2020.)
January 16, 1956	Monmouth College	Monmouth, Illinois	Active	
April 11, 1956	Colorado State University	Fort Collins, Colorado	Active	
April 11, 1956	Texas A&M University–Commerce	Commerce, Texas	Active	
May 16, 1956	Southern Illinois University Carbondale	Carbondale, Illinois	Inactive	
February 15, 1957	William Jewell College	Liberty, Missouri	Active	
March 24, 1957	Colorado College	Colorado Springs, Colorado	Inactive	
May 9, 1957	University of Southern Mississippi	Hattiesburg, Mississippi	Inactive	
May 20, 1957	Michigan State University	East Lansing, Michigan	Inactive	
May 23, 1957	Lake Erie College	Painesville, Ohio	Inactive	
May 29, 1957	Iowa State University	Ames, Iowa	Active	
February 14, 1958	Arizona State University	Tempe, Arizona	Inactive	
February 15, 1958	University at Buffalo	Buffalo, New York	Inactive	
February 16, 1958	University of Arizona	Tucson, Arizona	Inactive	
March 14, 1958	Central Methodist University	Fayette, Missouri	Active	
March 20, 1958	Regis College	Weston, Massachusetts	Active	
April 12, 1958	Kansas State University	Manhattan, Kansas	Inactive	
April 17, 1958	University of Memphis	Memphis, Tennessee	Inactive	
April 29, 1958	Baylor University	Waco, Texas	Active	
September 23, 1958	Samford University	Homewood, Alabama	Active	(Note: The chapter formed at Howard College which became Samford University in 1965.)
March 7, 1959	Fort Hays State University	Hays, Kansas	Inactive	
April 5, 1959	Morningside University	Sioux City, Iowa	Inactive	
April 12, 1959	Marygrove College	Detroit, Michigan	Inactive	(Note: The college closed on December 17, 2019.)
February 18, 1960	Kent State University	Kent, Ohio	Active	
March 7, 1960	University of Texas at El Paso	El Paso, Texas	Active	
March 15, 1960	Mississippi College	Clinton, Mississippi	Inactive	
March 27, 1960	University of Massachusetts Amherst	Amherst, Massachusetts	Active	
April 26, 1960	Otterbein University	Westerville, Ohio	Active	
May 1, 1960	University of the Pacific	Stockton, California	Inactive	
May 14, 1960	Miami University	Oxford, Ohio	Active	
December 5, 1960	Temple University	Philadelphia, Pennsylvania	Inactive	
January 14, 1961	Central Michigan University	Mount Pleasant, Michigan	Inactive	
January 19, 1961	Oklahoma Baptist University	Shawnee, Oklahoma	Inactive	
February 2, 1961	University of Central Missouri	Warrensburg, Missouri	Inactive	
April 28, 1961	College of William & Mary	Williamsburg, Virginia	Active	
December 7, 1961	Cornell University	Ithaca, New York	Inactive	
January 6, 1962	Western Michigan University	Kalamazoo, Michigan	Active	
January 21, 1962	University of Evansville	Evansville, Indiana	Inactive	
March 24, 1962	Howard Payne University	Brownwood, Texas	Inactive	
December 9, 1962	Texas Christian University	Fort Worth, Texas	Inactive	
December 12, 1962	University of South Carolina	Columbia, South Carolina	Active	
February 12, 1963 – 1974	University of Washington	Seattle, Washington	Inactive	
February 14, 1963	San Jose State University	San Jose, California	Inactive	
February 9, 1964	University of Colorado Boulder	Boulder, Colorado	Inactive	
February 21, 1964	North Dakota State University	Fargo, North Dakota	Inactive	
April 26, 1964	University of Connecticut	Storrs, Connecticut	Active	
January 14, 1965	University of Louisiana at Monroe	Monroe, Louisiana	Inactive	
February 16, 1965	DePaul University	Chicago, Illinois	Inactive	
February 20, 1965	East Tennessee State University	Johnson City, Tennessee	Inactive	
March 10, 1965	Northwestern State University	Natchitoches, Louisiana	Active	
March 16, 1965	Mississippi State University	Starkville, Mississippi	Inactive	
March 27, 1965	Arkansas State University	State University, Arkansas	Active	
May 5, 1965	University of Houston	Houston, Texas	Inactive	
May 17, 1965	University of Louisiana at Lafayette	Lafayette, Louisiana	Active	
April 19, 1965	Southern Nazarene University	Bethany, Oklahoma	Active	
November 23, 1965	University of Illinois Chicago	Chicago, Illinois	Inactive	
January 27, 1966	Ohio Northern University	Ada, Ohio	Active	
February 2, 1966	University of Hawaiʻi at Mānoa	Honolulu, Hawaii	Inactive	
February 25, 1966	University of Charleston	Charleston, West Virginia	Inactive	
March 6, 1966	Bowling Green State University	Bowling Green, Ohio	Active	
April 3, 1966	Minnesota State University Moorhead	Moorhead, Minnesota	Inactive	
November 1, 1966	Illinois State University	Normal, Illinois	Inactive	
November 7, 1966	Longwood University	Farmville, Virginia	Active	
November 12, 1966	South Dakota State University	Brookings, South Dakota	Inactive	
November 21, 1966	Winthrop University	Rock Hill, South Carolina	Active	
December 9, 1966	California State University, Long Beach	Long Beach, California	Inactive	
October 28, 1967	Oklahoma State University–Stillwater	Stillwater, Oklahoma	Inactive	
November 4, 1967	Indiana State University	Terre Haute, Indiana	Active	
November 5, 1967	University of California, Santa Barbara	Santa Barbara, California	Inactive	
November 8, 1967	Lamar University	Beaumont, Texas	Inactive	
November 12, 1967	Murray State University	Murray, Kentucky	Inactive	
November 18, 1968	Georgetown College	Georgetown, Kentucky	Active	
November 18, 1967	Wayne State College	Wayne, Nebraska	Active	
December 3, 1967	Eastern New Mexico University	Portales, New Mexico	Inactive	
November 16, 1968	Carson–Newman University	Jefferson City, Tennessee	Active	
November 21, 1969	Texas A&M University–Kingsville	Kingsville, Texas	Inactive	
December 7, 1968	Nicholls State University	Thibodaux, Louisiana	Active	
December 7, 1968	Washington State University	Pullman, Washington	Inactive	
December 11, 1968	Carthage College	Kenosha, Wisconsin	Active	
November 18, 1969	University of West Georgia	Carrollton, Georgia	Active	
December 6, 1969	Vanderbilt University	Nashville, Tennessee	Active	
February 22, 1970	Syracuse University	Syracuse, New York	Inactive	
November 13, 1970	Sam Houston State University	Huntsville, Texas	Active	
November 14, 1970	University of Wisconsin–Platteville	Platteville, Wisconsin	Active	
November 15, 1970	Anderson University	Anderson, Indiana	Inactive	
December 2, 1970	North Carolina State University	Raleigh, North Carolina	Inactive	
December 2, 1970	Virginia Tech	Blacksburg, Virginia	Inactive	
December 10, 1970	University of Maine	Orono, Maine	Active	
May 2, 1971	Angelo State University	San Angelo, Texas	Inactive	
October 24, 1971	Stephens College	Columbia, Missouri	Inactive	
October 31, 1971	University of Wisconsin–Eau Claire	Eau Claire, Wisconsin	Active	
November 4, 1971	Clemson University	Clemson, South Carolina	Active	
November 7, 1971	University of South Alabama	Mobile, Alabama	Inactive	
November 19, 1971	University of Alabama at Birmingham	Birmingham, Alabama	Active	
December 5, 1971	Elizabethtown College	Elizabethtown, Pennsylvania	Active	
February 19, 1972	Tulane University	New Orleans, Louisiana	Active	
October 20, 1972	Western Carolina University	Cullowhee, North Carolina	Active	
November 4, 1972	Midland University	Fremont, Nebraska	Active	
November 30, 1972	West Chester University	West Chester, Pennsylvania	Inactive	
February 26, 1973	Valdosta State University	Valdosta, Georgia	Inactive	
October 21, 1973	Radford University	Radford, Virginia	Inactive	
November 11, 1973	Western Illinois University	Macomb, Illinois	Inactive	
November 15, 1973	Oral Roberts University	Tulsa, Oklahoma	Inactive	
November 15, 1973	Tennessee Tech	Cookeville, Tennessee	Active	
November 16, 1973	University of Central Oklahoma	Edmond, Oklahoma	Inactive	
January 18, 1974	Texas State University	San Marcos, Texas	Active	
March 25, 1974	Texas Lutheran University	Seguin, Texas	Active	
November 6, 1974	University of North Alabama	Florence, Alabama	Inactive	
November 10, 1974	Troy University	Troy, Alabama	Active	
November 10, 1974	University of Alabama in Huntsville	Huntsville, Alabama	Active	
November 14, 1974	Wichita State University	Wichita, Kansas	Inactive	
December 8, 1974	Midwestern State University	Wichita Falls, Texas	Active	
December 8, 1974	West Virginia Wesleyan College	Buckhannon, West Virginia	Active	
January 26, 1975	Texas A&M University	College Station, Texas	Inactive	
October 31, 1975	Tennessee State University	Nashville, Tennessee	Active	
November 25, 1975	University of Toledo	Toledo, Ohio	Inactive	
February 13, 1976	Maryville College	Maryville, Tennessee	Inactive	
April 27, 1976	Rider University	Lawrence Township, New Jersey	Active	
November 14, 1976	Roanoke College	Salem, Virginia	Active	
November 18, 1976	Georgia Southwestern State University	Americus, Georgia	Active	
December 1, 1977	Susquehanna University	Selinsgrove, Pennsylvania	Active	
December 11, 1977	Jackson State University	Jackson, Mississippi	Active	
October 8, 1978	Ball State University	Muncie, Indiana	Active	
October 8, 1978	North Carolina A&T State University	Greensboro, North Carolina	Active	
December 2, 1979	Salem College	Winston-Salem, North Carolina	Active	
January 23, 1980	Penn State Altoona	Logan Township, Pennsylvania	Inactive	
November 3, 1980	Brenau University	Gainesville, Georgia	Active	
November 3, 1980	Millikin University	Decatur, Illinois	Active	
November 18, 1980	Texas Wesleyan University	Fort Worth, Texas	Active	
December 2, 1980	Austin Peay State University	Clarksville, Tennessee	Active	
April 27, 1981	American University	Washington, D.C.	Active	
May 1, 1981	University of Texas at San Antonio	San Antonio, Texas	Inactive	
March 15, 1982	Converse University	Spartanburg, South Carolina	Active	
May 2, 1982	Tougaloo College	Jackson, Mississippi	Active	
October 28, 1982	Morgan State University	Baltimore, Maryland	Inactive	
March 6, 1983	Simpson College	Indianola, Iowa	Active	
January 20, 1984	Southern Oregon University	Ashland, Oregon	Inactive	
April 19, 1984	Hiram College	Hiram, Ohio	Inactive	
February 1, 1985	McNeese State University	Lake Charles, Louisiana	Active	
April 16, 1985 – January 22, 2013; 2024	Indiana University Indianapolis	Indianapolis, Indiana	Active	(Note: IUI merged into IUPUI in 2013. In 2024, IUPUI separated and the IUI chapter was reformed.)
April 16, 1985	Saint Joseph's College	Rensselaer, Indiana	Inactive	
April 22, 1985	Columbia College	Columbia, South Carolina	Inactive	
June 2, 1985	University of Rio Grande	Rio Grande, Ohio	Inactive	
November 2, 1985	University of Wisconsin–Green Bay	Green Bay, Wisconsin	Inactive	
March 26, 1986	Spelman College	Atlanta, Georgia	Active	
April 14, 1986	Heidelberg University	Tiffin, Ohio	Active	
August 26, 1986	Liberty University	Lynchburg, Virginia	Active	
December 2, 1986	Northern Arizona University	Flagstaff, Arizona	Active	
February 11, 1987	Wright State University	Fairborn, Ohio	Active	
October 3, 1987	Wesleyan College	Macon, Georgia	Active	
February 28, 1988	Colorado State University Pueblo	Pueblo, Colorado	Active	
April 16, 1988	University of Pittsburgh at Bradford	Bradford, Pennsylvania	Active	
April 20, 1988	Cumberland University	Lebanon, Tennessee	Active	
May 8, 1988	University of North Carolina at Greensboro	Greensboro, North Carolina	Active	
September 16, 1988	Rose–Hulman Institute of Technology	Terre Haute, Indiana	Active	
January 24, 1989	Louisiana College	Pineville, Louisiana	Inactive	
March 28, 1989	Marietta College	Marietta, Ohio	Active	
April 1, 1989	University of Portland	Portland, Oregon	Active	
April 9, 1989	Dickinson College	Carlisle, Pennsylvania	Active	
April 19, 1989	Maryville University	St. Louis, Missouri	Active	
April 20, 1989	Columbia College	Columbia, Missouri	Inactive	
November 12, 1989	University of the Sciences	Philadelphia, Pennsylvania	Inactive	(Note: The university merged into Saint Joseph's University on June 1, 2022.)
November 29, 1989	Meredith College	Raleigh, North Carolina	Active	
February 20, 1990	Lenoir–Rhyne University	Hickory, North Carolina	Active	
May 29, 1990	Montana State University Billings	Billings, Montana	Inactive	
November 17, 1990	George Mason University	Fairfax, Virginia	Active	
April 14, 1991	Western New England University	Springfield, Massachusetts	Active	
May 11, 1992	Linfield University	McMinnville, Oregon	Active	
October 3, 1992	Gettysburg College	Gettysburg, Pennsylvania	Inactive	
October 17, 1992	Sweet Briar College	Amherst County, Virginia	Active	
February 18, 1993	Chestnut Hill College	Philadelphia, Pennsylvania	Active	
March 8, 1993 – xxxx?; 2021	University of Massachusetts Lowell	Lowell, Massachusetts	Active	
April 25, 1993	University of the Cumberlands	Williamsburg, Kentucky	Inactive	
March 7, 1994	University of Delaware	Newark, Delaware	Active	
December 1, 1994	Winona State University	Winona, Minnesota	Active	
January 9, 1995	University of California, Riverside	Riverside, California	Inactive	
April 22, 1995	Saint Vincent College	Latrobe, Pennsylvania	Active	
April 23, 1995	Phillips University	Enid, Oklahoma	Inactive	
September 27, 1995	LIU Brooklyn	Brooklyn, New York	Active	
November 9, 1995	Ashland University	Ashland, Ohio	Active	
May 1, 1997	Minnesota State University, Mankato	Mankato, Minnesota	Active	
May 4, 1997	University of New Haven	West Haven, Connecticut	Active	
September 16, 1997	Georgia Baptist College of Nursing	Atlanta, Georgia	Inactive	
November 6, 1997	Grambling State University	Grambling, Louisiana	Active	
April 26, 1998	Shenandoah University	Winchester, Virginia	Active	
May 11, 1998	Georgia College & State University	Milledgeville, Georgia	Active	
February 7, 1999	Youngstown State University	Youngstown, Ohio	Active	
April 19, 1999	United States Coast Guard Academy	New London, Connecticut	Inactive	
September 26, 1999	Massachusetts College of Liberal Arts	North Adams, Massachusetts	Active	
October 14, 1999	University of Missouri–Kansas City	Kansas City, Missouri	Inactive	
November 19, 1999	Piedmont University	Demorest, Georgia	Active	
January 23, 2000	Johnson C. Smith University	Charlotte, North Carolina	Active	
February 18, 2000	Warner University	Lake Wales, Florida	Active	
November 3, 2000	Judson University	Elgin, Illinois	Active	
November 4, 2000	Fitchburg State University	Fitchburg, Massachusetts	Inactive	
November 6, 2000	University of Massachusetts Boston	Boston, Massachusetts	Active	
March 6, 2001	Framingham State University	Framingham, Massachusetts	Active	
March 28, 2001	McMurry University	Abilene, Texas	Active	
May 18, 2001	California State Polytechnic University, Pomona	Pomona, California	Active	
November 18, 2001	University of Scranton	Scranton, Pennsylvania	Inactive	
November 25, 2001	McDaniel College	Westminster, Maryland	Active	
February 12, 2002	University of La Verne	La Verne, California	Active	
March 22, 2002	Schreiner University	Kerrville, Texas	Active	
March 24, 2003	University of Minnesota Crookston	Crookston, Minnesota	Active	
April 6, 2003	Cleveland State University	Cleveland, Ohio	Active	
April 13, 2003	University of Texas Rio Grande Valley	Edinburg, Texas	Active	
April 21, 2003	Central Connecticut State University	New Britain, Connecticut	Inactive	
April 27, 2003	West Virginia University	Morgantown, West Virginia	Inactive	
May 3, 2003	Ramapo College	Mahwah, New Jersey	Active	
May 31, 2003	South University	Savannah, Georgia	Inactive	
September 1, 2003	Franklin College	Franklin, Indiana	Active	
October 7, 2003	University of Arkansas–Fort Smith	Fort Smith, Arkansas	Active	
October 28, 2003	Bennett College	Greensboro, North Carolina	Active	
November 3, 2003 – 2015	Central Washington University	Ellensburg, Washington	Inactive	
March 30, 2004	University of Colorado Colorado Springs	Colorado Springs, Colorado	Inactive	
March 30, 2004	University of Hartford	West Hartford, Connecticut	Active	
April 1, 2004	Montclair State University	Montclair, New Jersey	Active	
April 13, 2004	University of Texas at Arlington	Arlington, Texas	Active	
April 24, 2004	Washington & Jefferson College	Washington, Pennsylvania	Active	
May 8, 2004	William Penn University	Oskaloosa, Iowa	Active	
September 25, 2004	Chowan University	Murfreesboro, North Carolina	Active	
October 29, 2004	Dominican University of California	San Rafael, California	Inactive	
October 30, 2004	Northern Michigan University	Marquette, Michigan	Inactive	
November 7, 2004	Lyndon State College	Lyndonville, Vermont	Inactive	(Note: Lyndon State College merged with Johnson State College to form Northern Vermont University in 2018.)
January 23, 2005	Eastern Kentucky University	Richmond, Kentucky	Active	
March 4, 2006	Cazenovia College	Cazenovia, New York	Inactive	
September 30, 2006	State University of New York at Fredonia	Fredonia, New York	Active	
November 6, 2006	Valley City State University	Valley City, North Dakota	Active	
September 14, 2007	Washburn University	Topeka, Kansas	Active	
September 28, 2007	PennWest California	California, Pennsylvania	Active	
October 5, 2007	North Central College	Naperville, Illinois	Inactive	
October 14, 2007	University of Maine at Farmington	Farmington, Maine	Inactive	
February 16, 2008	Buffalo State University	Buffalo, New York	Active	
February 17, 2008	Morehouse College	Atlanta, Georgia	Active	
March 29, 2008	Baldwin Wallace University	Berea, Ohio	Inactive	
November 9, 2008	Oakland University	Rochester, Michigan	Inactive	
March 18, 2009	Mary Baldwin University	Staunton, Virginia	Active	
March 18, 2009	Norfolk State University	Norfolk, Virginia	Inactive	
March 22, 2009	Hood College	Frederick, Maryland	Active	
September 20, 2009	University of Wisconsin–Oshkosh	Oshkosh, Wisconsin	Active	
November 17, 2009	Hawaii Pacific University	Honolulu, Hawaii	Active	
December 2, 2009	Transylvania University	Lexington, Kentucky	Active	
March 15, 2010	Dominican University New York	Orangeburg, New York	Active	
April 23, 2010	Cabrini University	Radnor Township, Pennsylvania	Active	
April 25, 2010	University of Central Arkansas	Conway, Arkansas	Active	
April 30, 2010	Mississippi Valley State University	Mississippi Valley State, Mississippi	Inactive	
September 14, 2010	Art Institute of Washington	Arlington, Virginia	Inactive	(Note: The Arlington Campus closed in December 2018.)
September 19, 2010	California State University San Marcos	San Marcos, California	Active	
October 2, 2010	Thomas Jefferson University, East Falls	East Falls, Pennsylvania	Active	(Note: The chapter formed at Philadelphia University, which became the Thomas Jefferson University, East Falls campus in 2017.)
November 18, 2010	Xavier University of Louisiana	New Orleans, Louisiana	Active	
March 27, 2011	Becker College	Worcester, Massachusetts	Inactive	
April 10, 2011	Fontbonne University	Clayton, Missouri	Active	
September 24, 2011	Methodist University	Fayetteville, North Carolina	Active	
October 1, 2011	Fort Valley State University	Fort Valley, Georgia	Inactive	
April 1, 2012	Northern Kentucky University	Highland Heights, Kentucky	Active	
April 10, 2012	Clayton State University	Morrow, Georgia	Inactive	
April 19, 2012	Pace University Pleasantville Campus	Pleasantville, New York	Active	
April 20, 2012	Pace University New York City Campus	New York City, New York	Active	
September 15, 2012	Lyon College	Batesville, Arkansas	Active	
November 27, 2012	Salem State University	Salem, Massachusetts	Active	
January 22, 2013 – 2024	Indiana University–Purdue University Indianapolis	Indianapolis, Indiana	Inactive	(Note: In 2024, IUPUI split into two separate universities, Indiana University Indianapolis and Purdue University in Indianapolis. At that time, the IUI chapter was reactivated.)
January 22, 2013	Indiana University–Purdue University Columbus	Columbus, Indiana	Inactive	
February 9, 2013	University of New Orleans	New Orleans, Louisiana	Active	
September 30, 2013	Southwestern University	Georgetown, Texas	Inactive	
September 30, 2013	University of Houston–Downtown	Houston, Texas	Inactive	
October 12, 2013	University of Wisconsin–Milwaukee	Milwaukee, Wisconsin	Inactive	
December 6, 2013 – 2016	University of Washington Tacoma	Tacoma, Washington	Inactive	
February 21, 2014	Stockton University	Galloway Township, New Jersey	Active	
March 30, 2014	Delaware Valley University	Doylestown, Pennsylvania	Active	
September 20, 2014	Keystone College	Northeastern Pennsylvania	Active	
October 14, 2014	Westminster College	Fulton, Missouri	Active	
October 19, 2014	Wilkes University	Wilkes-Barre, Pennsylvania	Active	
February 9, 2015	St. Edward's University	Austin, Texas	Inactive	
April 10, 2015	High Point University	High Point, North Carolina	Active	
September 30, 2015	University of Bridgeport	Bridgeport, Connecticut	Inactive	
October 25, 2015	Saint Anselm College	Manchester, New Hampshire	Active	
November 9, 2015	Finlandia University	Hancock, Michigan	Inactive	(Note: The college closed after the spring 2023 semester.)
November 20, 2015	University of Illinois Springfield	Springfield, Illinois	Inactive	
March 17, 2016	Cheyney University of Pennsylvania	Cheyney, Pennsylvania	Inactive	
September 25, 2016	Milwaukee Institute of Art & Design	Milwaukee, Wisconsin	Active	
September 28, 2016	Mount Carmel College of Nursing	Columbus, Ohio	Inactive	
October 14, 2016	Davenport University	Grand Rapids, Michigan	Active	
November 11, 2016	St. Francis College	Brooklyn, New York	Active	
November 18, 2016	Thomas More University	Crestview Hills, Kentucky	Active	
October 4, 2017	American Public University System	Charles Town, West Virginia	Active	
November 2, 2017	Coppin State University	Baltimore, Maryland	Active	
November 28, 2017	Blue Mountain Christian University	Blue Mountain, Mississippi	Active	
March 2, 2018	Sonoma State University	Rohnert Park, California	Active	
April 19, 2018	University of Missouri–St. Louis	St. Louis, Missouri	Active	
April 26, 2018	Illinois College	Jacksonville, Illinois	Active	
November 14, 2018	Governors State University	University Park, Illinois	Active	
March 12, 2019	Chicago State University	Chicago, Illinois	Active	
March 22, 2019	Utica University	Utica, New York	Active	
March 28, 2019	Campbellsville University	Campbellsville, Kentucky	Active	
April 5, 2019	Missouri Valley College	Marshall, Missouri	Active	
April 8, 2019	Westfield State University	Westfield, Massachusetts	Active	
April 16, 2019	Georgia Gwinnett College	Lawrenceville, Georgia	Active	
April 25, 2019	Mount St. Joseph University	Delhi Township, Ohio	Active	
October 11, 2019	California State University, Monterey Bay	Seaside, California	Active	
October 8, 2020	Luther College	Decorah, Iowa	Active	
October 14, 2020	Philander Smith University	Little Rock, Arkansas	Active	
October 15, 2020	Midway University	Midway, Kentucky	Active	
October 26, 2020	Newberry College	Newberry, South Carolina	Active	
October 30, 2020	Edward Waters University	Jacksonville, Florida	Active	
November 6, 2020	Le Moyne College	DeWitt, New York	Active	
November 13, 2020	Randolph–Macon College	Ashland, Virginia	Active	
November 14, 2020	University of South Carolina Aiken	Aiken, South Carolina	Active	
February 11, 2021	American University of Sharjah	Sharjah, United Arab Emirates	Active	
February 19, 2021	National Louis University	Chicago, Illinois	Active	
March 10, 2021	East Texas Baptist University	Marshall, Texas	Active	
March 25, 2021	William Paterson University	Wayne, New Jersey	Active	
April 27, 2021	Mount Saint Mary's University, Los Angeles	Los Angeles, California	Active	
March 29, 2022	Saint Peter's University	Jersey City, New Jersey	Active	
April 5, 2022	Gwynedd Mercy University	Lower Gwynedd Township, Pennsylvania	Active	
April 6, 2022	Florida A&M University	Tallahassee, Florida	Active	
April 28, 2022	Miles College	Fairfield, Alabama	Active	
April 29, 2022	Louisiana State University Shreveport	Shreveport, Louisiana	Active	
May 5, 2022	Central State University	Wilberforce, Ohio	Inactive	
October 21, 2022	Simmons College of Kentucky	Louisville, Kentucky	Active	
November 1, 2022	Austin College	Sherman, Texas	Active	
November 4, 2022	Bellarmine University	Louisville, Kentucky	Active	
March 3, 2023	James Madison University	Harrisonburg, Virginia	Active	
April 25, 2023	American University in Dubai	Dubai, United Arab Emirates	Active	
May 9, 2023	California State University, Northridge	Northridge, Los Angeles	Active	
May 10, 2023	California State University, Chico	Chico, California	Active	
Fall 2023	Roberts Wesleyan University	Rochester, New York	Active	
February 20, 2024	Fairmont State University	Fairmont, West Virginia	Active	
February 29, 2024	Kennedy–King College	Chicago, Illinois	Active	
March 6, 2024	Endicott College	Beverly, Massachusetts	Active	
March 13, 2024	Albany State University	Albany, Georgia	Active	
March 21, 2024	Southern University	Baton Rouge, Louisiana	Active	
March 25, 2024	Lander University	Greenwood, South Carolina	Active	
April 4, 2024	Wiley University	Marshall, Texas	Active	
April 19, 2024	State University of New York at Oneonta	Oneonta, New York	Active	
Spring 2024	Livingstone College	Salisbury, North Carolina	Active	
