= Mount Carmel East =

- Mount Carmel Health System
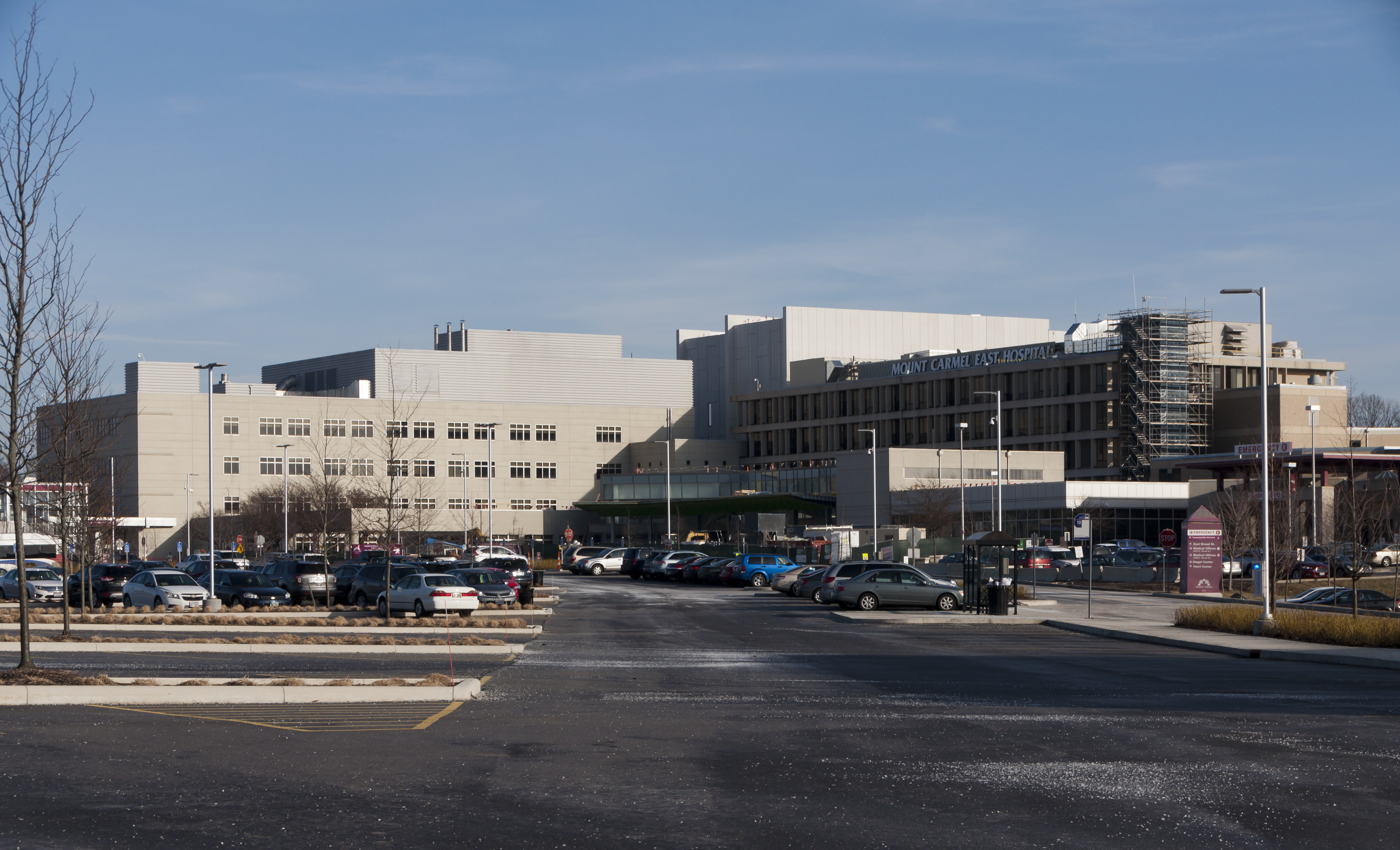
- Mount Carmel East undergoing renovation in 2018

Geography
- Location: Columbus, Ohio, United States
- Coordinates: 39°58′37″N 82°50′38″W

Organization
- Type: Short Term Acute Care

Services
- Emergency department: Level II trauma center
- Beds: 419

Helipads
- Helipad: FAA LID: 28OI

History
- Founded: 1972

Links
- Website: www.mountcarmelhealth.com/mount-carmel-east-hospital
- Lists: Hospitals in Ohio

Mount Carmel East is a primary care hospital in Columbus, Ohio. Located on a 77-acre (31 ha) campus just outside of the suburb of Reynoldsburg, the hospital serves the east side of Columbus as well as other smaller communities. Mount Carmel East is part of Mount Carmel Health System, which was founded in 1886 by the Sisters of the Holy Cross. It is located off Interstate 270 and is accessible from the Central Ohio Transit Authority (COTA) public transport network. The hospital opened in 1972, and has expanded since, becoming the largest hospital in the Mount Carmel Health System network and the fourth-largest hospital in Central Ohio. U.S. News & World Report regionally ranked Mount Carmel East and West Hospitals as the 18th best performing hospitals in Ohio and high performing in four specialties and procedures.

Mount Carmel East offers many treatments from specialists and services within its grounds. In 2003, a new four-story tower opened, dedicated to expanding both the heart diagnostic, surgical and treatment capacity along with a new maternity unit. In 2015, the hospital began a large expansion to accommodate the needs of the growing population on the east side of Columbus. This expansion consists of an entire reconstruction of the original structure. A new five-story patient tower and several additions to the hospital had the specific focus of expanding the capacity services offered on-site. This expansion is being driven to meet the needs of the growing population in the area. This project is not scheduled to be completed until 2019.

== History ==
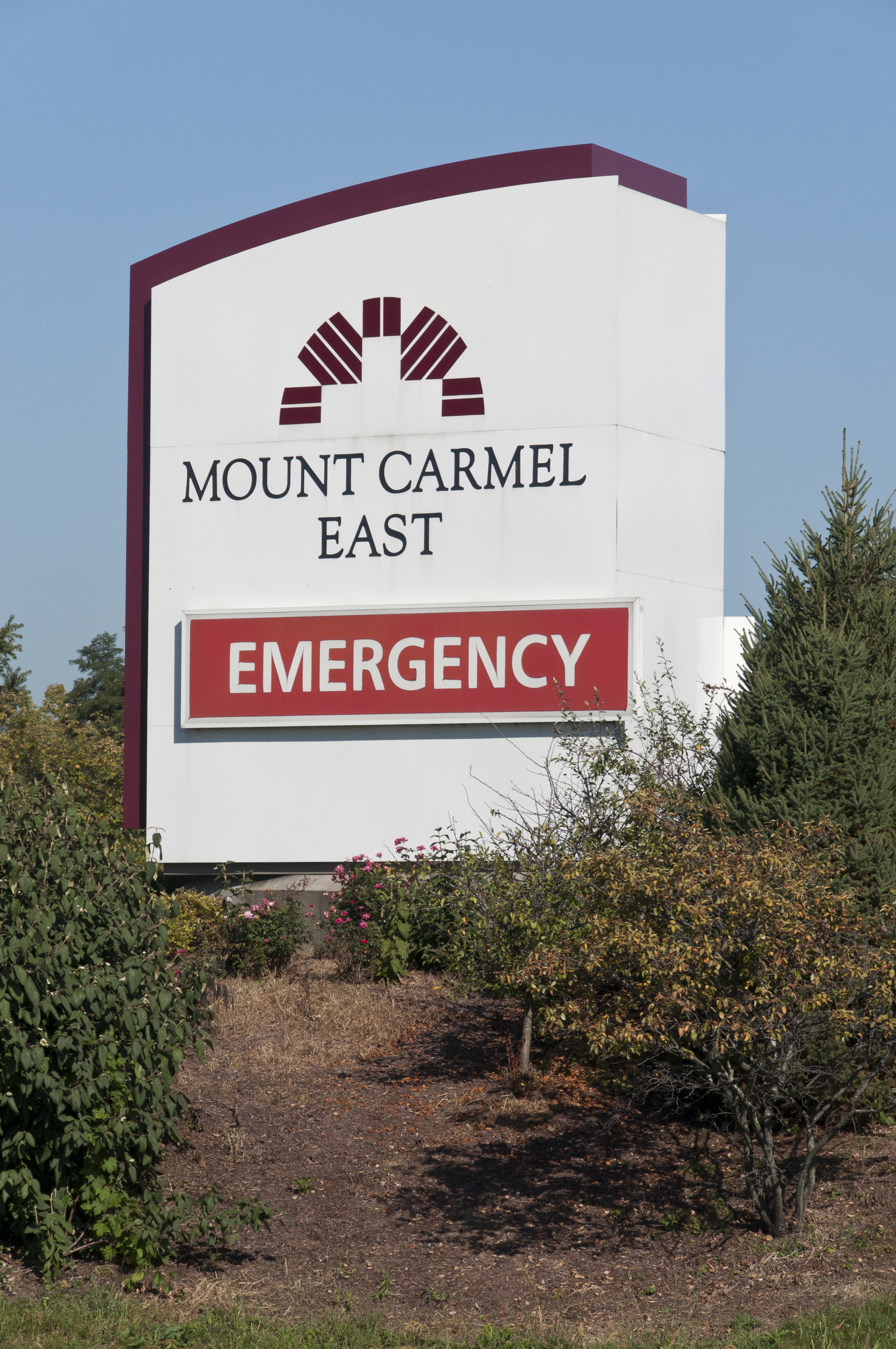
The sign for Mount Carmel East Hospital

The land that would eventually become Mount Carmel East was purchased in 1908, and originally supported a farm that grew food for what is now Mount Carmel West. The five-year construction of the original hospital was completed in 1972, opening as a 233-bed facility.

In 1984, Mount Carmel Health System was created, incorporating all Mount Carmel Hospitals and associated organizations under a new health care organization. In 1999 Mount Carmel East Hospital was renamed Mount Carmel East. In 2000, Mount Carmel joined Trinity Health, the third largest Catholic healthcare system in the United States. In 2015, Mount Carmel Health System had an operating income of $61.9 million on $1.70 billion in revenue, ranking Mount Carmel the second-largest system in the Trinity Health group.

In 2003, construction was finished on a four-story, 128,000-square-foot (11,900 m^{2}), $66 million tower designed to expand the cardiac and maternity care at the hospital. The expanded maternity unit is designed to handle 3,500 deliveries a year. The expansion of the heart center included two operating rooms and many cardiology upgrades allowing it to function as a fully functioning emergency cardiac treatment center. Following this, in July 2003, an $18 million project to expand the emergency room was completed.

In 2015, a plan was announced to begin construction on a new five-story patient tower, reducing the number of beds from the current 419 to 381 all-private patient rooms. This includes thorough reconstruction of the original structure to better accommodate the needs of the population on the east side of Columbus as it has become the largest hospital on the east side of Columbus. In addition, there will be a new surgical suite with 12 operating rooms and 40 prep and recovery rooms. The main entrance and emergency room are planned to be heavily reconstructed as well, making each easier to access from outside along with an all new easier to navigate interior. This modernization of the entire hospital and construction of additional facilities is planned to be completed by the end of 2019.

== Services ==
In 2003, Mount Carmel East opened a new four-story, $66 million tower with a focus on cardiac and maternity care. Since this was completed, Mount Carmel East has two open-heart operating rooms, a stent-capable catheterization laboratory, a cardiovascular neuro-services center, an eight-bed post-surgery intensive care unit, an 18-bed coronary care unit and a 30-bed step-down unit all within its hospital grounds. A dedicated electrophysiology (EP) lab was opened in November 2003.

In 2005, Mount Carmel won the Catholic Health Association's Achievement Citation, and it was awarded the Thomson Reuters Top 50 Cardiovascular Hospitals award for heart care in 2010. Mount Carmel East has been accredited as an Advanced Comprehensive Stroke Center from the American Heart Association & American Stroke Association and received the Gold Seal of Approval from the Joint Commission.

A significant focus on maternity care has been a mission of this hospital since its founding. Mount Carmel East is equipped with a Level III neonatal intensive care unit and a Maternal-Fetal Medicine (MFM) program known as the Little Miracles program. In 2012, there were 2,347 births and 783 caesarean sections at this hospital. Free tours of the facilities are offered for expecting families during pregnancy.

The Bruce E. Siegel Center for Health Education was finished in 1993 and officially opened in January 1994. The facility was named after Bruce E. Siegel MD, one of the first members of the medical staff at Mount Carmel East. The center is used for community outreach and health education such as diabetes care, maternity programs and heart health seminars.

Mount Carmel East also has chaplains that are available to all patients and family members. Catholic Mass is offered in the chapel located in the Bruce E. Siegel Center on Sundays. The chapel in the hospital is open 24 hours a day.

In 2016, Mount Carmel East received a "B" Hospital Safety Score^{SM} from the Leapfrog Group, an independent nonprofit run by employers and other large purchasers of health benefits, whose stated goal is to save "lives by reducing errors, injuries, accidents and infections.” In the fall of 2017 the Leapfrog Group again rated Mount Carmel East a "B".

Mount Carmel East has many additional specialties and onsite including:

- Cardiology
- Cardiothoracic surgery
- Colorectal surgery
- Critical care
- Emergency medicine
- Endocrinology
- Endovascular and vascular surgery
- Family practice
- Gastroenterology
- General surgery
- Gynecology
- Infectious disease
- Internal medicine
- Nephrology
- Neurology
- Neurosurgery
- Obstetrics
- Oncology (medical & surgical)
- Ophthalmology
- Orthopedic surgery
- Physical medicine
- Plastic surgery
- Podiatry
- Pulmonology
- Radiology
- Thoracic surgery
- Urology
- Women's wealth

U.S. News & World Report rated Mount Carmel as high performing in four areas:

- Chronic obstructive pulmonary disease (COPD)
- Colon cancer surgery
- Heart failure
- Knee replacement

For the use of staff, patients, and visitors the hospital has several dining establishments including Subway as well as the Mount Carmel East Cafeteria open seven days a week. It is able to provide a wide variety menu and on-demand room service to meet patients' needs.

Mount Carmel Health System uses onsite security officers equipped with collapsible batons and pepper spray but who do not carry firearms. Mount Carmel Health System uses hand-held wands throughout Mount Carmel East for weapon detecting. Security officers are placed throughout the grounds and patrol all parking facilities. In emergency departments, these procedures are used on anyone who wishes to see someone who is a victim of domestic violence or gang activity. Mount Carmel has claimed the number of “disturbances” at its hospitals declined 27 per-cent between 2009 and 2011.

== Expansion ==
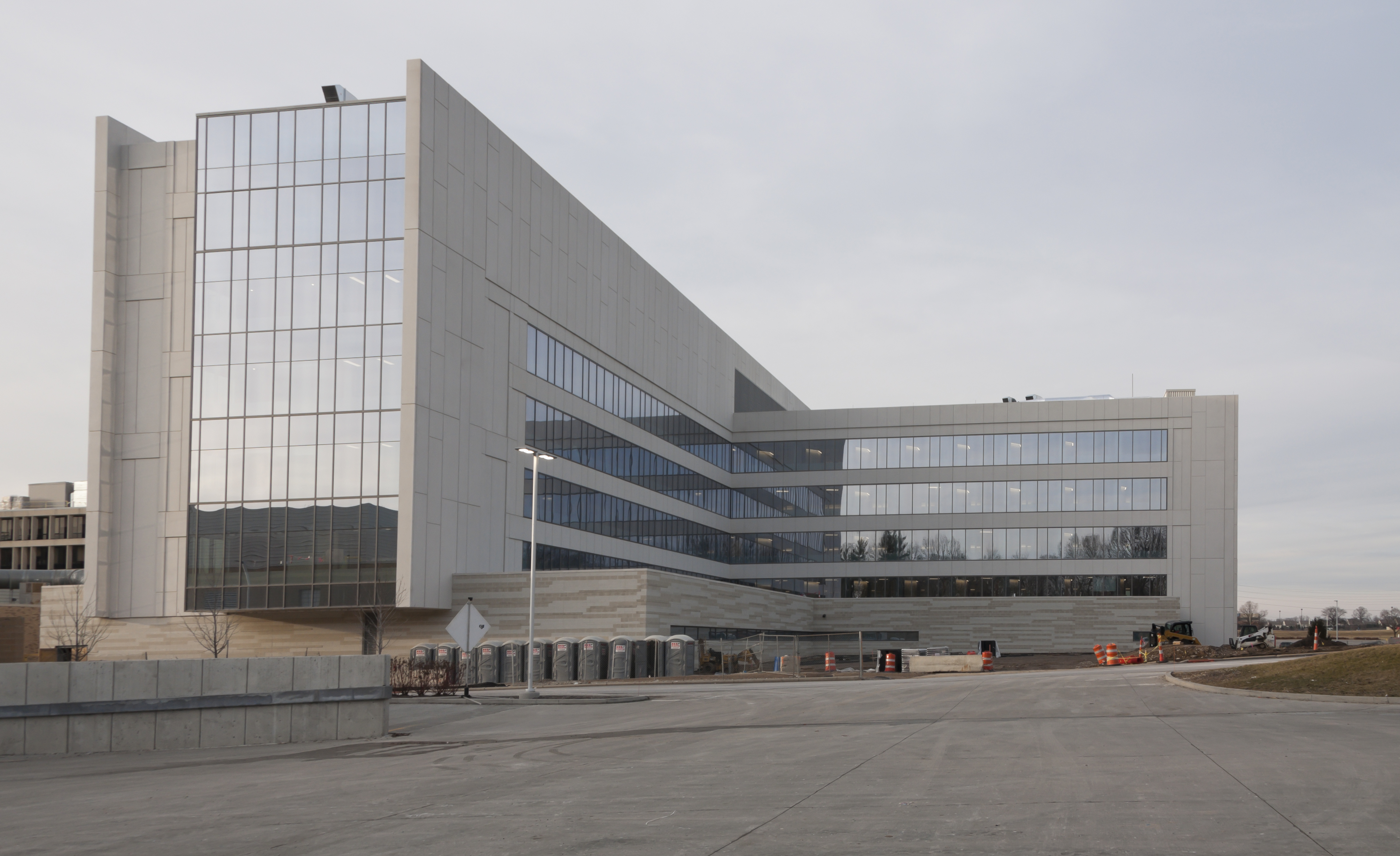
New patient tower under construction

Mount Carmel East witnessed large-scale expansion alongside other major facilities in the Mount Carmel Health network, with construction beginning in May 2015 and to be completed by the end of 2019. Many of the hospital's service areas were earmarked for this expansion, the most notable being a new 284,000-square-foot (26,400 m^{2}) six-story tower with one story below ground, the conversion of the existing 419 beds to 381 all-private patient rooms as well as a thorough reconstruction of the original structure. Mount Carmel worked with the neighboring community during the planning and construction including community outreach receiving mostly noise and construction-related complaints which culminated in a landscape plan around the hospital.

A new two-story parking garage with 439 spaces is constructed on an existing parking area in front of the Heart center bringing the total parking on site to around 2000. Several ancillary additions were also planned such as a new materials-handling wing, an expansion of the chiller building and boiler plant.

By mid-2017, Mount Carmel East had announced plans to build a new $26 million, 80-bed, behavioral-health hospital near the Mount Carmel East campus, to be opened by fall 2018. Inpatient behavioral-health beds at Mount Carmel West hospital would be moved there upon closure of West's behavioral-health facility. The location of the new behavioral-health facility is on the east side of Columbus, south of Interstate 70 and about six miles (9.7 km) from Mount Carmel East hospital.

== Mount Carmel Medical Group ==
Mount Carmel East is part of Mount Carmel Medical Group, representing more than 250 primary care and specialty care providers. This is a network of providers for care that is not of an emergency nature. The hospital is also affiliated with Mount Carmel Health Partners – a network of up to "1,200 primary care and specialty physicians" – and with Anthem Blue Cross and Blue Shield. This expanded the network of care providers in the central Ohio area that were associated with Mount Carmel, although unlike the situation with providers in the Mount Carmel Health System, items such as medical records may not be transferred automatically.

== Transport ==
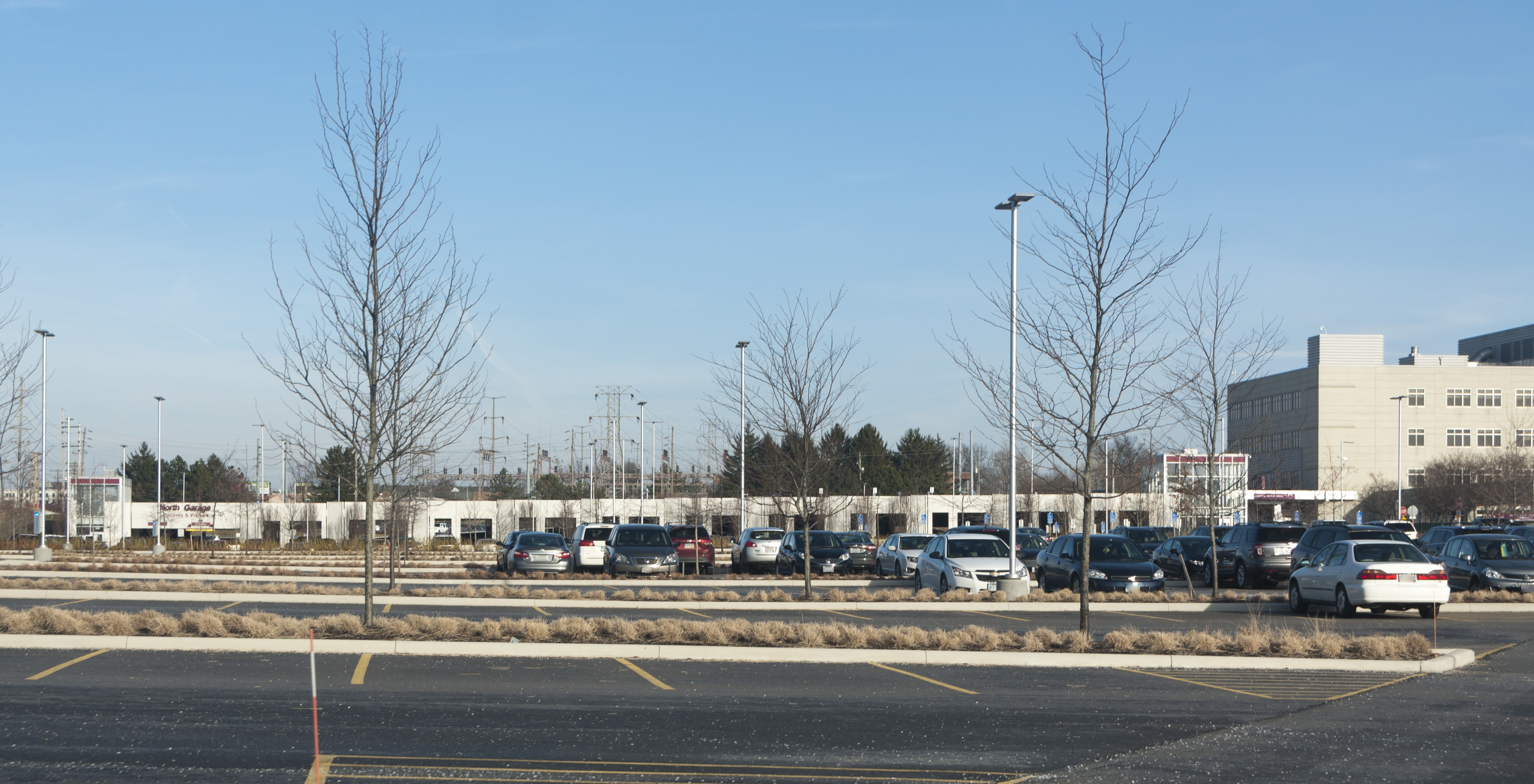
North parking garage

The hospital is accessible by public transport via COTA bus services operating throughout metropolitan Columbus, Ohio. Mount Carmel East is also accessible from Interstate 270 immediately off exit 39 onto Ohio State Route 16. They are also located close to John Glenn Columbus International Airport allowing fixed wing air ambulance aircraft to land nearby. Parking is available for free at a new parking garage and three parking lots nearby on the hospital grounds.

== Breakthroughs ==
Surgeons at Mount Carmel East helped develop the SpineMask technique for a new type of spinal surgery. SpineMask creates a map of the patient's spine using LED lights. Once this map is created, surgeons are able to see with more precision than presently available where their surgical instruments are in relation to the patient. This allows surgeons to more accurately perform spinal fusions while using a less invasive procedure for the patient.

== Gallery ==
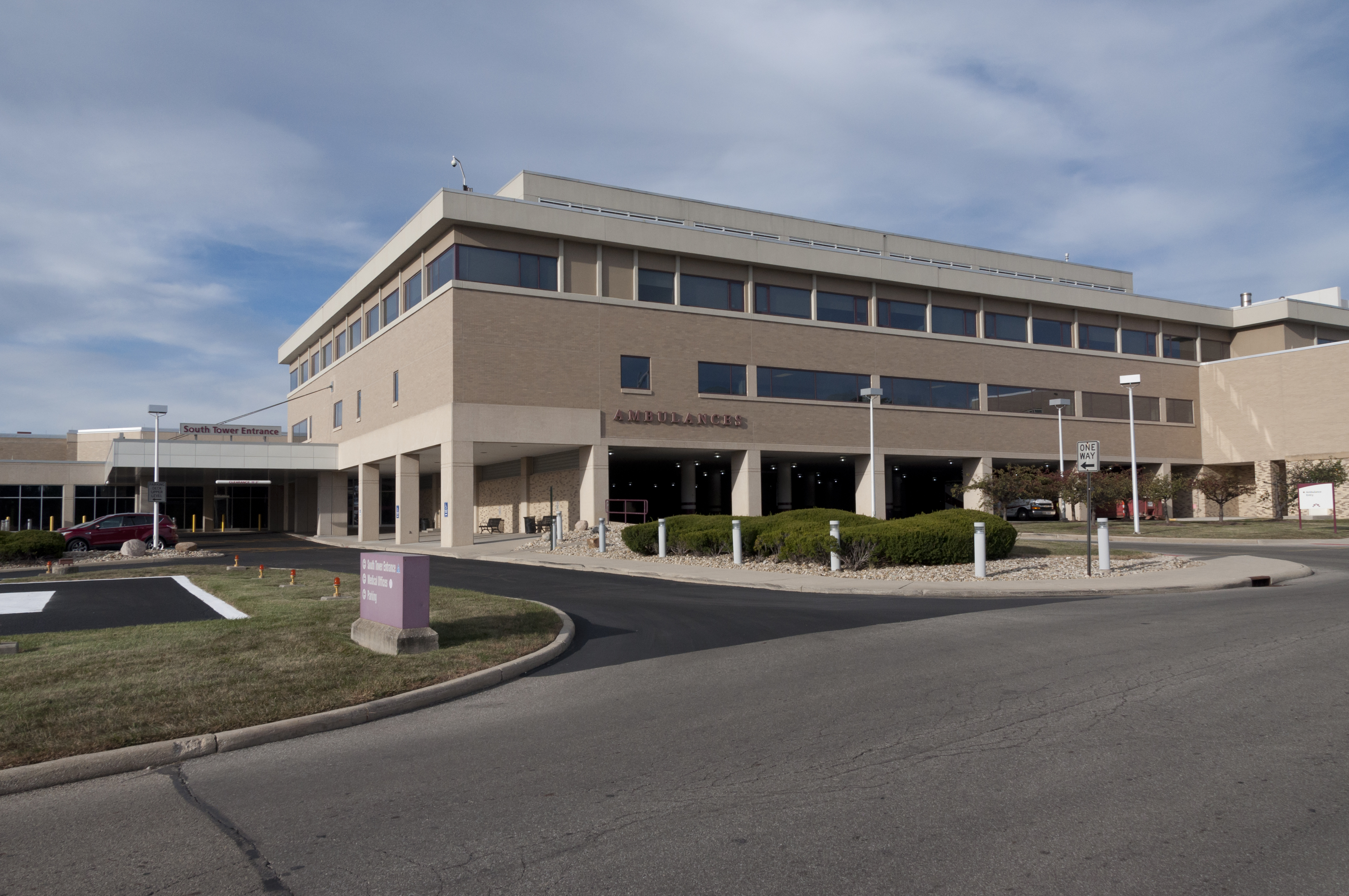
Ambulance and South Tower Entrance

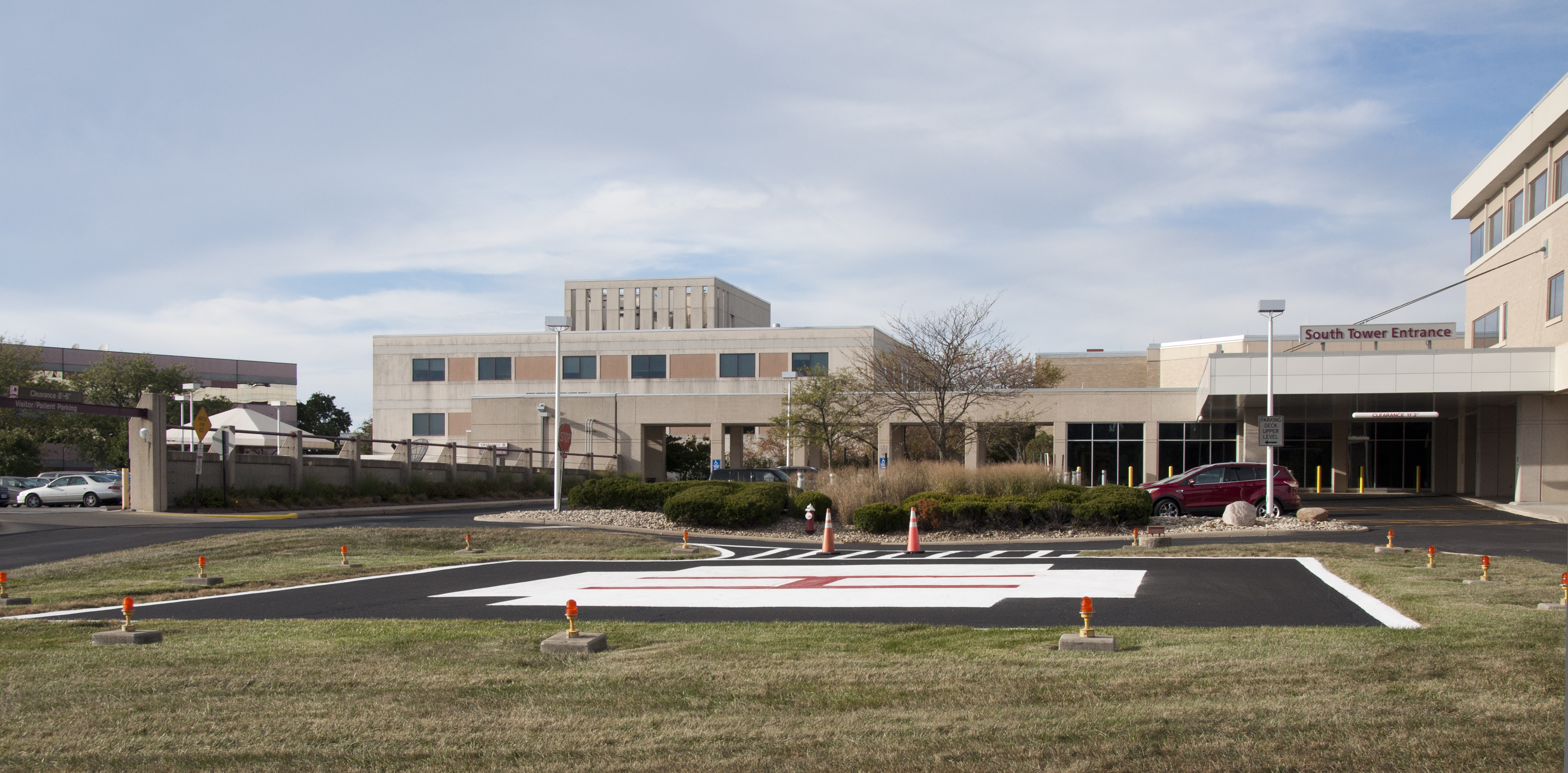
Helipad for Mount Carmel East

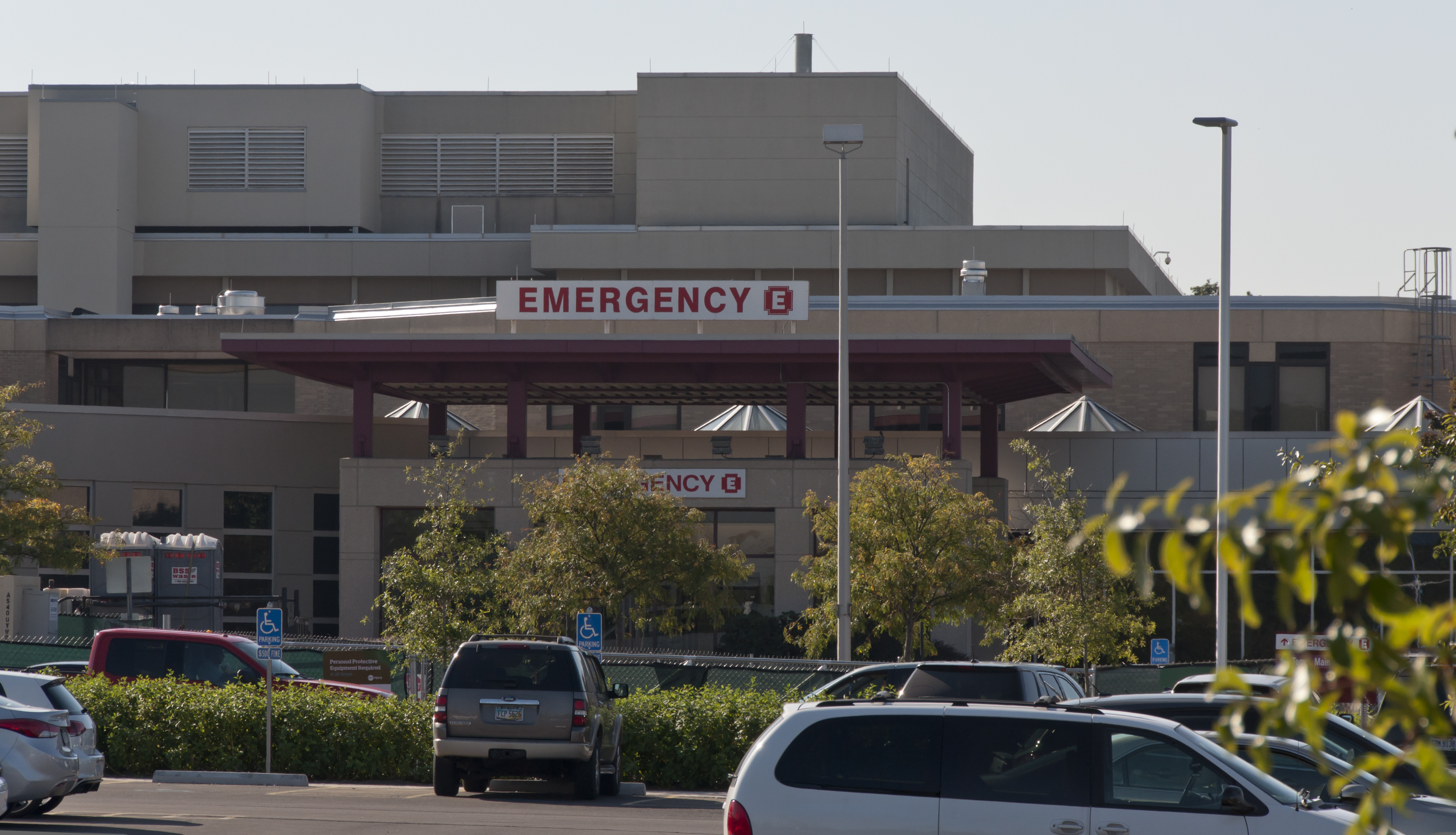
Mount Carmel East Emergency Receiving Area

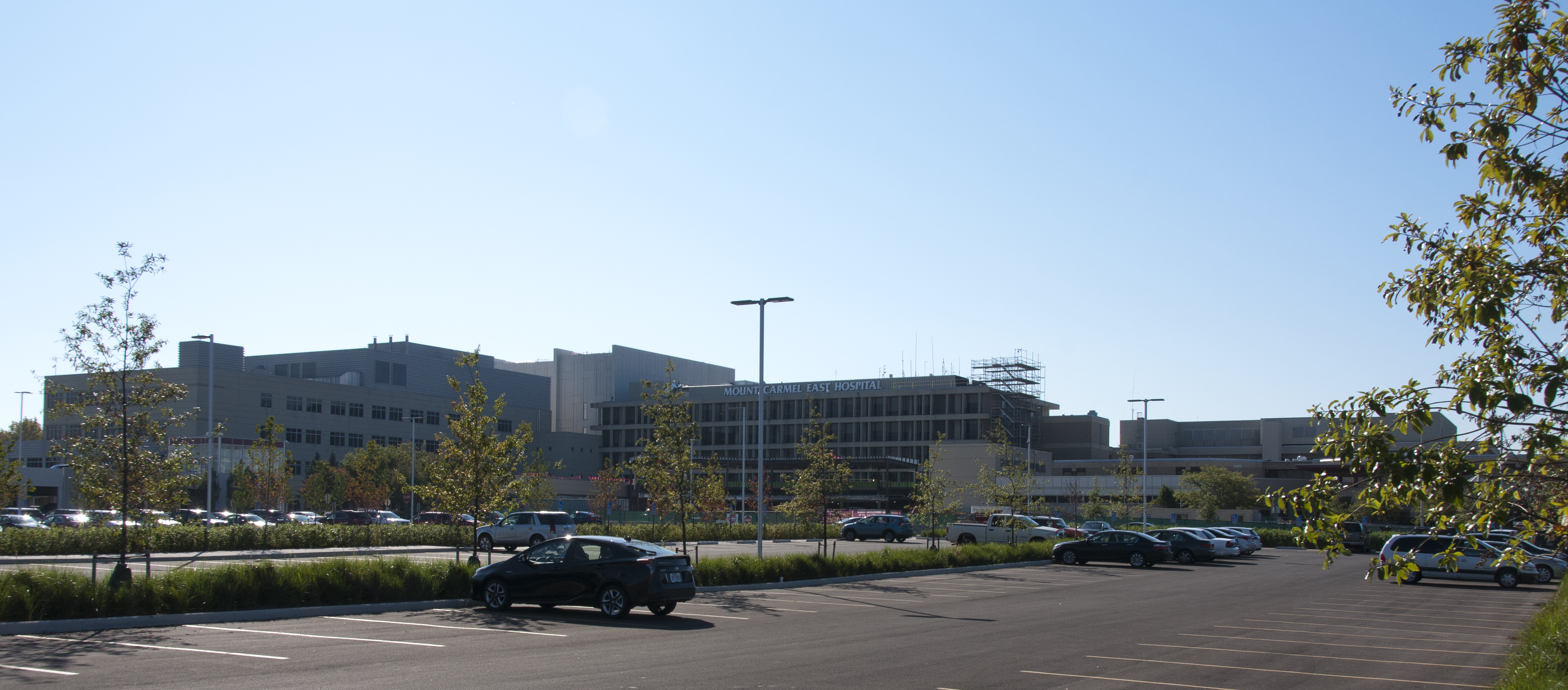
Mount Carmel East Undergoing Renovation in 2017

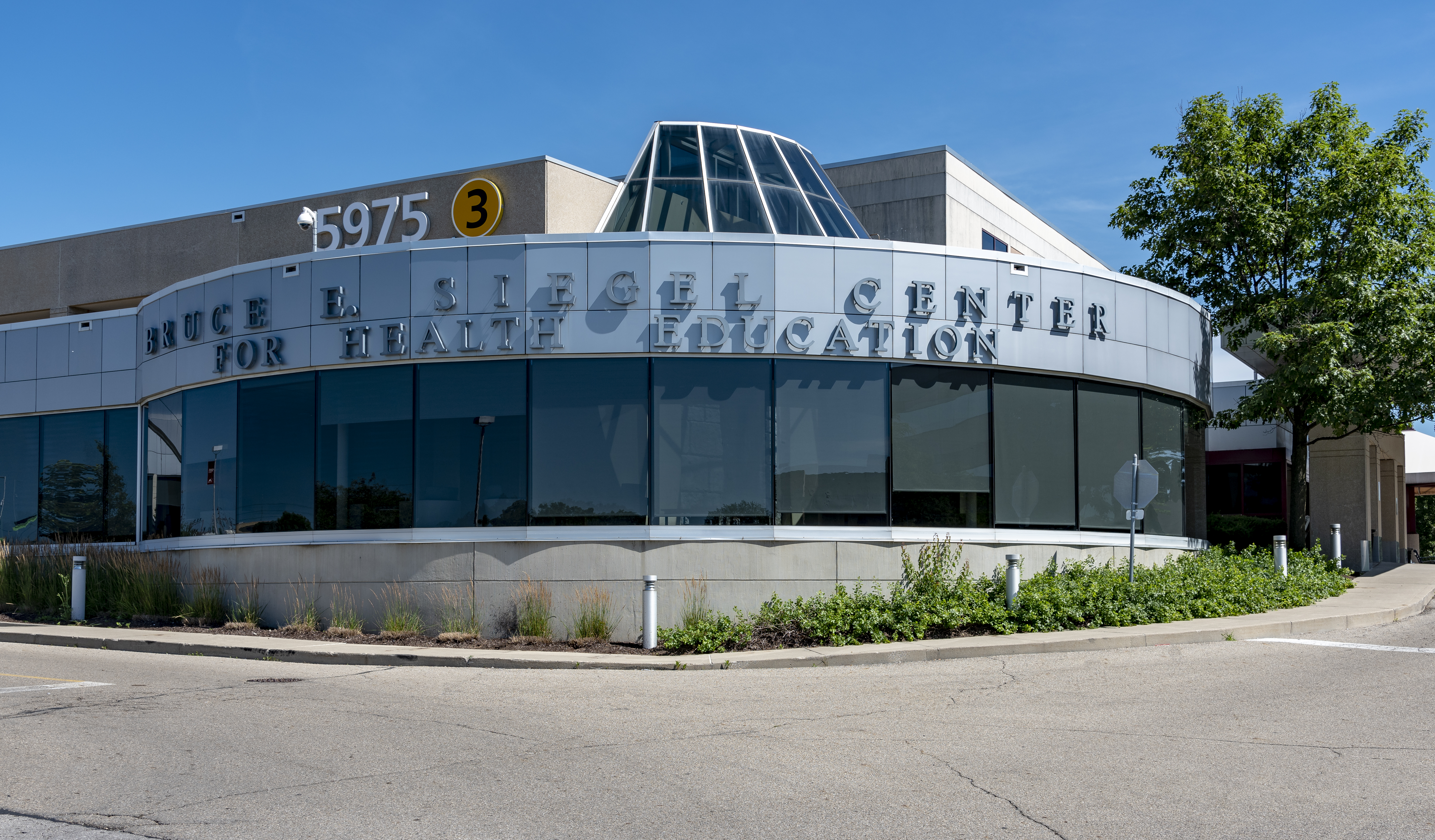
The Bruce E. Siegel Center
