= Mount Carmel College =

Mount Carmel College is the name of:

- Mount Carmel University, (formerly Mount Carmel College) is a private deemed university in Bengaluru, Karnataka, India.
- The Mount Carmel College of Baler, commonly referred to as MCC Baler or MCCB, is the oldest Catholic mission school in the Philippine province of Aurora.
- Mount Carmel College, Rosewater, South Australia, Australia, a Catholic secondary school
- Mount Carmel College, Sandy Bay, Tasmania, Australia, a Catholic school from kindergarten to Year 2 (for boys) and Year 10 (for girls)
- City of London Academy Highgate Hill, The site of the current school was previously known as Mount Carmel Catholic College for Girls. Mount Carmel was a Roman Catholic, girls-only school. It was originally located in Eden Grove, Holloway before moving to the present location. The school formally closed on 31 August 2017.

== See also ==
- Mount Carmel Catholic College for Girls, in London
- Mount Carmel High School (disambiguation)
