= Mount Carmel High School =

Mount Carmel High School may refer to these Catholic high schools:

== Australia ==
- Mount Carmel College, Sandy Bay, Tasmania
- Mount Carmel High School (Varroville), New South Wales

== Canada ==
- Our Lady of Mount Carmel Secondary School, in Mississauga, Ontario

== India ==
- Mount Carmel High School, Ahmedabad, Gujarat
- Mount Carmel High School (Akola), a co-educational school in Maharashtra
- Mount Carmel School (Bhagalpur), a boarding school for girls in Bihar
- Mount Carmel School, Darjeeling, a Catholic private school in Uttarakhand
- Mount Carmel School, Delhi
- Mount Carmel High School, Gaggal, Himachal Pradesh
- Mount Carmel High School, Gandhinagar, Gujarat
- Mount Carmel High School, Patna, a co-educational school in Bihar

== United States ==
- Mount Carmel High School (Chicago), Catholic boys school
- Mount Carmel High School (Los Angeles), closed 1976, demolished 1983, designated Los Angeles Historic-Cultural Monument
- Mt. Carmel High School (San Diego)
- Mount Carmel High School (Mount Carmel, Illinois), serves most of Wabash County
- Mount Carmel Area High School, Mount Carmel, Pennsylvania
- Mount Carmel High School (Texas), Houston, Texas
- Our Lady of Mount Carmel High School (Wyandotte, Michigan)
- Mount Carmel School (Northern Mariana Islands), Saipan

== United Kingdom ==
- Mount Carmel Catholic College for Girls, London
- Mount Carmel Roman Catholic High School, Accrington, Lancashire
- Mount Carmel School, Alderley Edge, Cheshire, a precursor of Alderley Edge School for Girls

== See also ==
- Mount Carmel Academy (disambiguation)
- Mount Carmel College (disambiguation)
