= Aut Even Hospital =

Private hospital in Kilkenny city, Ireland

- UPMC
- Shown in Ireland

Geography
- Location: Kilkenny, Ireland
- Coordinates: 52.6767°N 7.2724°W

Organisation
- Care system: Private
- Type: General

History
- Founded: 1915

Links
- Website: upmc.ie/locations/hospitals/aut-even

Aut Even Hospital (Irish: Ospidéal Áit Aoibhinn) is a private hospital in Kilkenny, Ireland. The name is anglicised from the Irish áit aoibhinn meaning beautiful place. The hospital was acquired by the University of Pittsburgh Medical Center (UPMC) group in 2020, and renamed UPMC Aut Even Hospital. It is 3 km north of the city centre, on the R693 road.

== History ==
Founded by Lady Desart in 1915, the hospital was taken over by the Brothers Hospitallers of Saint John of God in 1933. It was next acquired by Harlequin Healthcare, a company controlled by Gerry Conlan who also owned St. Joseph's Hospital, Sligo, in March 2005. After Conlan acquired Mount Carmel Hospital in Dublin in 2006, his business evolved to become Mount Carmel Medical Group. In 2008, the hospital received Joint Commission accreditation. After Conlan's business got into financial difficulties, a receiver was appointed to dispose of the shareholding in Aut Even Hospital in 2014.

== Services ==
The hospital has 102 in-patient beds, with a catchment area of over 450,000. It has a twin theatre 18-bed day surgery and endoscopy suite, and 4 main operating theatres. Specialities provided include general medicine, general surgery, ophthalmology, audiology, neurology, cardiology, rheumatology, gynaecology, otolaryngology (ENT), orthopaedics, dermatology, vascular surgery, respiratory medicine, gastroenterology, orthopaedics, urology, MRI and diagnostic imaging, and oral surgery.
