= Kingsbridge Private Hospital, Sligo =

Kingsbridge Private Hospital Sligo
- 3fivetwo Group
- Shown in Ireland

Geography
- Location: Garden Hill, Sligo, Ireland
- Coordinates: 54.2687°N 8.4835°W

Organisation
- Care system: Private
- Type: General

Services
- Beds: 19

History
- Founded: 1957

Links
- Website: www.kingsbridgeprivatehospital.ie

Kingsbridge Private Hospital Sligo (Irish: Ospidéal Príobháideach Dhroichead an Rí, Sligeach) is a private hospital in Garden Hill, Sligo, Ireland.

== History ==
The hospital was established by the Sisters of St. Joseph of the Apparition as St Joseph's Hospital in 1957. The current hospital building was completed in 1972. In 2001, Harlequin Healthcare, a company controlled by Jerry Conlan bought the hospital. After Conlan acquired Mount Carmel Hospital in Dublin in 2006, his business evolved to become Mount Carmel Medical Group. In 2009, the hospital received Joint Commission International accreditation. Conlan's business got into financial difficulties and, in June 2015, the hospital was acquired by the Belfast-based healthcare business, Kingsbridge Healthcare Group which runs Kingsbridge Private Hospital in Belfast.

== Services ==
Specialities provided include general surgery, urology, otolaryngology (ENT), orthopaedics, rheumatology, ophthalmology, dermatology, vascular surgery, geriatrics, gynaecology, paediatrics, oncology, cardiology, general medicine, and neurology. It has 19 beds and about 60 staff.
