= Kingsbridge Healthcare Group =

Kingsbridge Healthcare Group is the largest private medical provider in Northern Ireland. It was formerly called 3fivetwo Medical Group. It was founded in 2004 by Suresh Tharma, an NHS consultant obstetrician and gynaecologist and Ashok Songra, consultant maxillo-facial surgeon.

The Kingsbridge Healthcare Group owns Kingsbridge Private Hospital, Belfast, Kingsbridge Private Hospital, Sligo, the Cosmetech cosmetic surgery business and the l Private GP service at their Maypole Clinic in Holywood. In 2018, Bupa awarded the company a contract to manage a clinic which provides health screening, private GP services and muscle and joint assessment.

In November 2019 it opened a new £1 million six-bed ward at Kingsbridge Private Hospital and announced that it plans to increase patient capacity by 30% and take on 30 new staff. This expansion is driven by increasing waiting times for surgery in the Health and Social Care in Northern Ireland and is financed by a £5 million investment by the Foresight Group, which is represented on the board of directors. In 2022 it opened the new ‘Liz Dallas Outpatients Centre’ at their Hospital Ballykelly and a new Operating Theatre and Intensive Care Unit in Belfast.

The company's income dropped by 35% between 2014 and 2018 but improved after an improved focus on private patient income.

== See also ==
- Private healthcare in the United Kingdom
