= Mount Carmel Academy =

Mount Carmel Academy may refer to:

- Mount Carmel Academy (Louisiana)
- Mount Carmel Academy (Texas)
- Mount Carmel Academy (Wichita, Kansas)

== See also ==
- Mount Carmel High School (disambiguation)
