= Mount Carmel West =

- Mount Carmel Health System
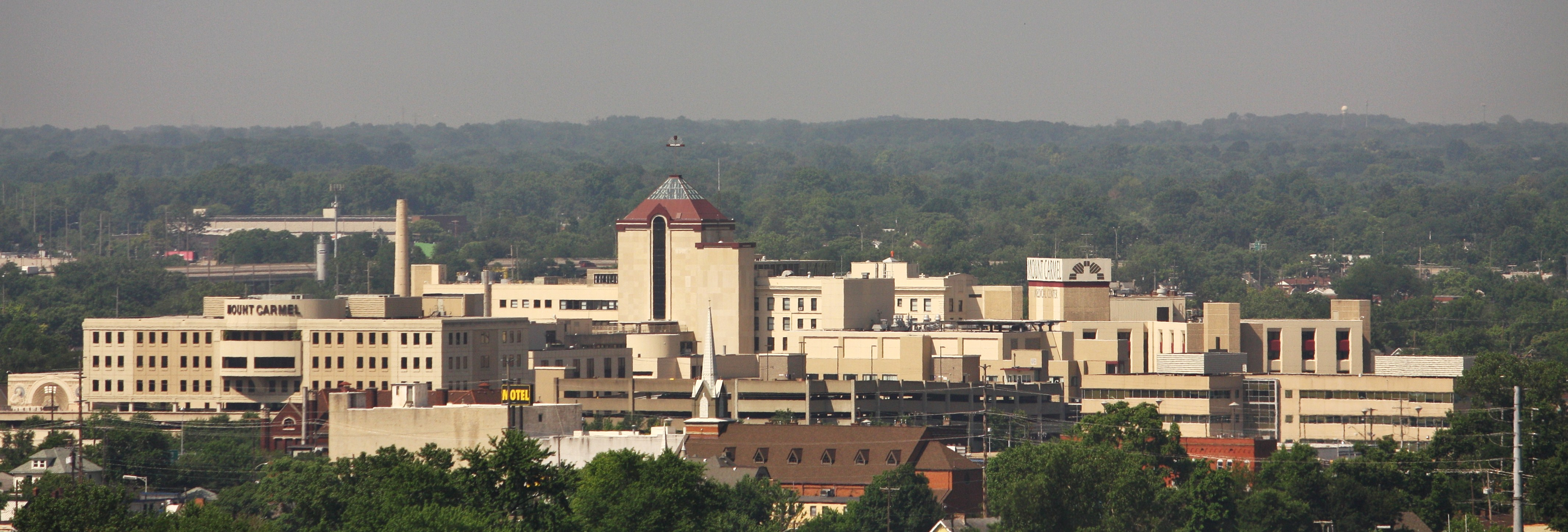
- Mount Carmel West in Franklinton, 2011

Geography
- Location: Columbus, Ohio, United States
- Coordinates: 39°57′27″N 83°01′18″W

Organization
- Type: Short Term Acute Care

Services
- Emergency department: US Level II Trauma

Helipads
- Helipad: FAA LID: OI61

History
- Closed: February 24, 2019

Links
- Website: www.mountcarmelhealth.com/mount-carmel-west-hospital
- Lists: Hospitals in Ohio

Mount Carmel West was a primary care hospital located in Franklinton, Columbus, Ohio on a 37-acre campus. Mount Carmel West was the oldest hospital in the Mount Carmel Health System, founded in 1886 by the Sisters of the Holy Cross. The hospital was situated between Ohio State Route 16 and U.S. Route 62, and accessible from exits on Interstate 70 and Ohio State Route 315. The Mount Carmel College of Nursing is located on hospital grounds. U.S. News & World Report regionally ranked Mount Carmel East and West Hospitals the number 18 best performing among hospitals in Ohio and high performing in four specialties and procedures.

Mount Carmel West was a tertiary hospital with many specialties located on its grounds, but in late 2016 a $46 million plan was announced to transform it into an outpatient facility with a fully functioning emergency department in a new location on the premises. The inpatient services will be moved to a new location under construction in Grove City, while the Level II Trauma Center will be moved to the existing Mount Carmel East hospital near Reynoldsburg. The majority of the hospital will be demolished with demolition plans to be completed in 2020. This will see the expansion of the College of Nursing and closure of the inpatient Psychiatry unit with it being moved to a new facility near Mount Carmel East.

== History ==
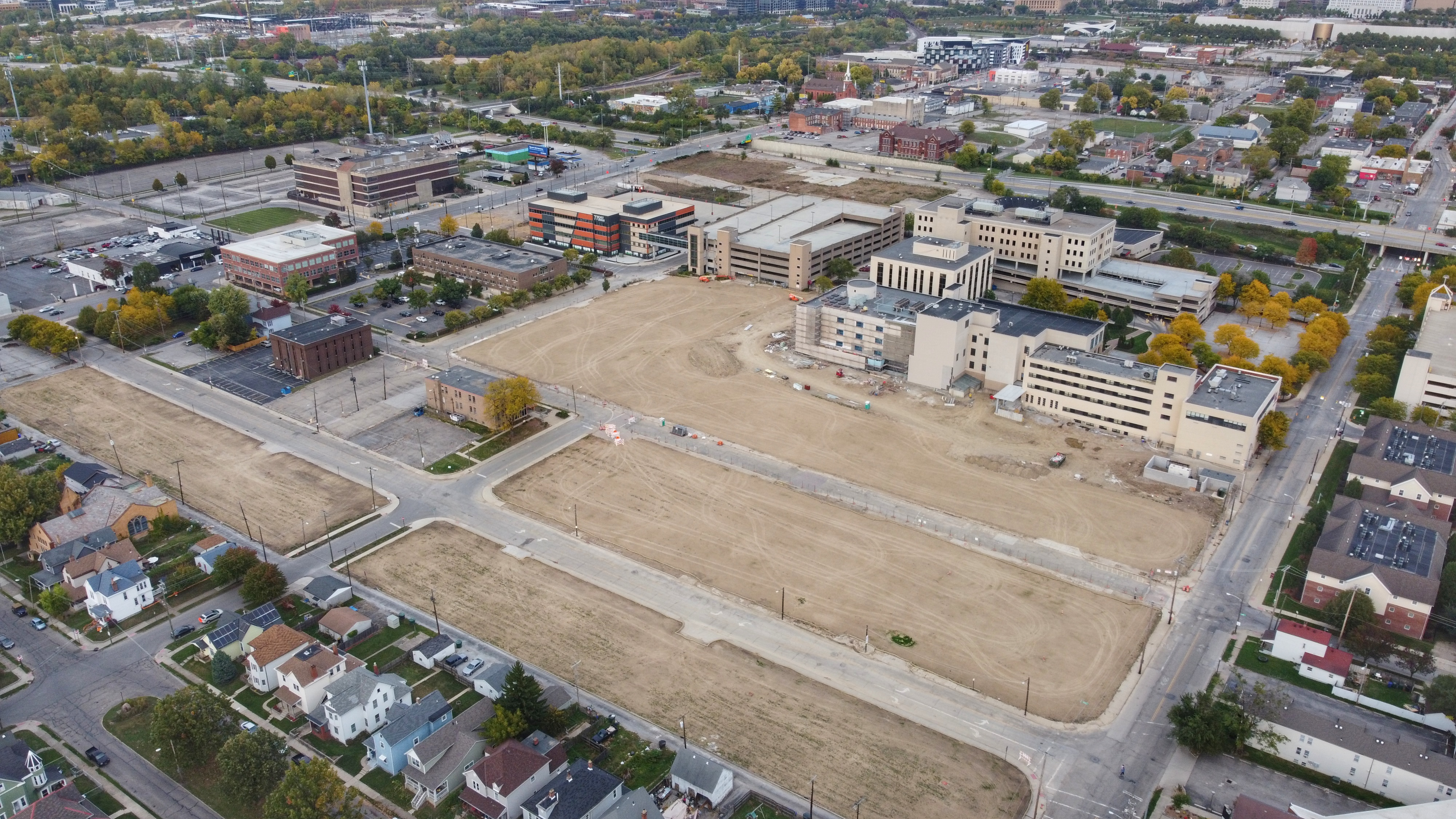
The demolished hospital site in front of the College of Nursing, 2020

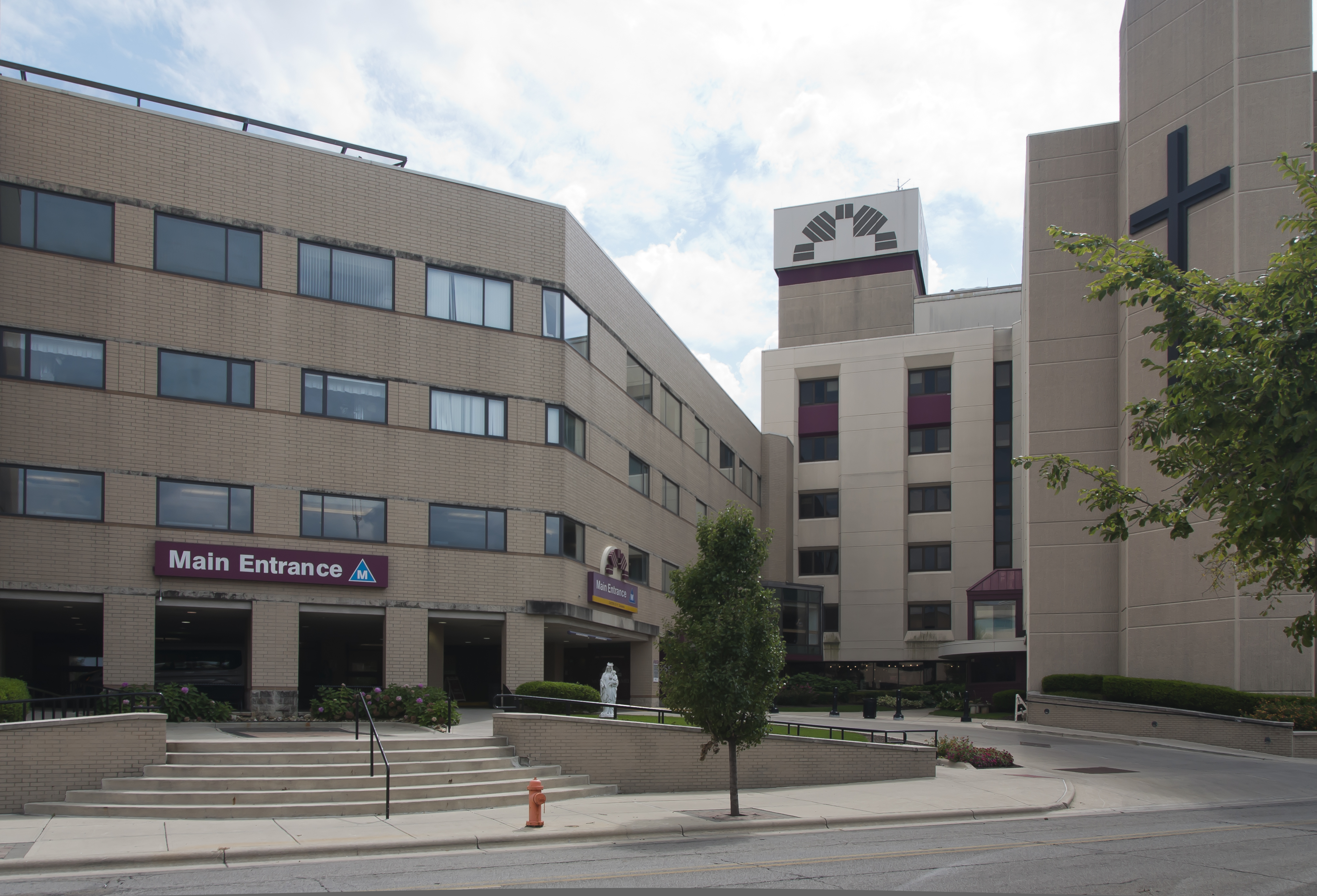
Mount Carmel West main entrance in 2017

What would become Mount Carmel West was first known as Hawkes Hospital of Mt. Carmel, and was founded by Dr. W. B. Hawkes (1812–1883). Before the building was completed, Dr. Hawkes died and was buried in Green Lawn Cemetery in Columbus, Ohio. Dr. John W. Hamilton (1823–1898) was tasked to finish construction, and secured the services of the Sisters of the Holy Cross to operate the hospital.

The hospital was formally opened in 1886. The hospital was opened intending to serve the needs of infants and women. In 1906, a second building adjoining the old one containing a chapel and 120 additional patient rooms was started. The Training School for Nurses was opened in 1903 and included eight sisters in the first graduating class. It has since become the Mount Carmel College of Nursing. It was not until 1921 that an additional 120 patient rooms were added on as well as 20 rooms with recreation halls, three classrooms, and a library to help to the Mount Carmel School of Nursing which is what the nursing school was known as at the time.

From 2014 to 2018, one of the hospital's doctors, William Husel, was to alleged to have overdosed 35 patients at Mount Carmel West and Mount Carmel St. Ann's. Husel was originally charged with the murder of 25 of them, for prescribing large doses of fentanyl, administered by nurses with no oversight. Eleven of those charges were dropped. On April 20, 2022, William Husel was acquitted of the other 14 charges. The hospital fired the doctor, paid $13 million to families in settlements, and the hospital's CEO and chief clinical officer resigned. About 20 employees were fired over the incidents.

In late 2016, a plan was agreed that will begin in 2019 of the transformation of Mount Carmel West from a full inpatient hospital to a facility based on outpatient services while still retaining a full-service emergency department. Mount Carmel Health System plans to begin demolishing the majority of Mount Carmel West hospital by spring 2019 after moving inpatient services will be moved to a new 210-bed hospital being constructed in Grove City. The Emergency department is being rebuilt in a new location. The College of Nursing will also be expanded. All planned work should be finished by 2020.

== Mount Carmel College of Nursing ==
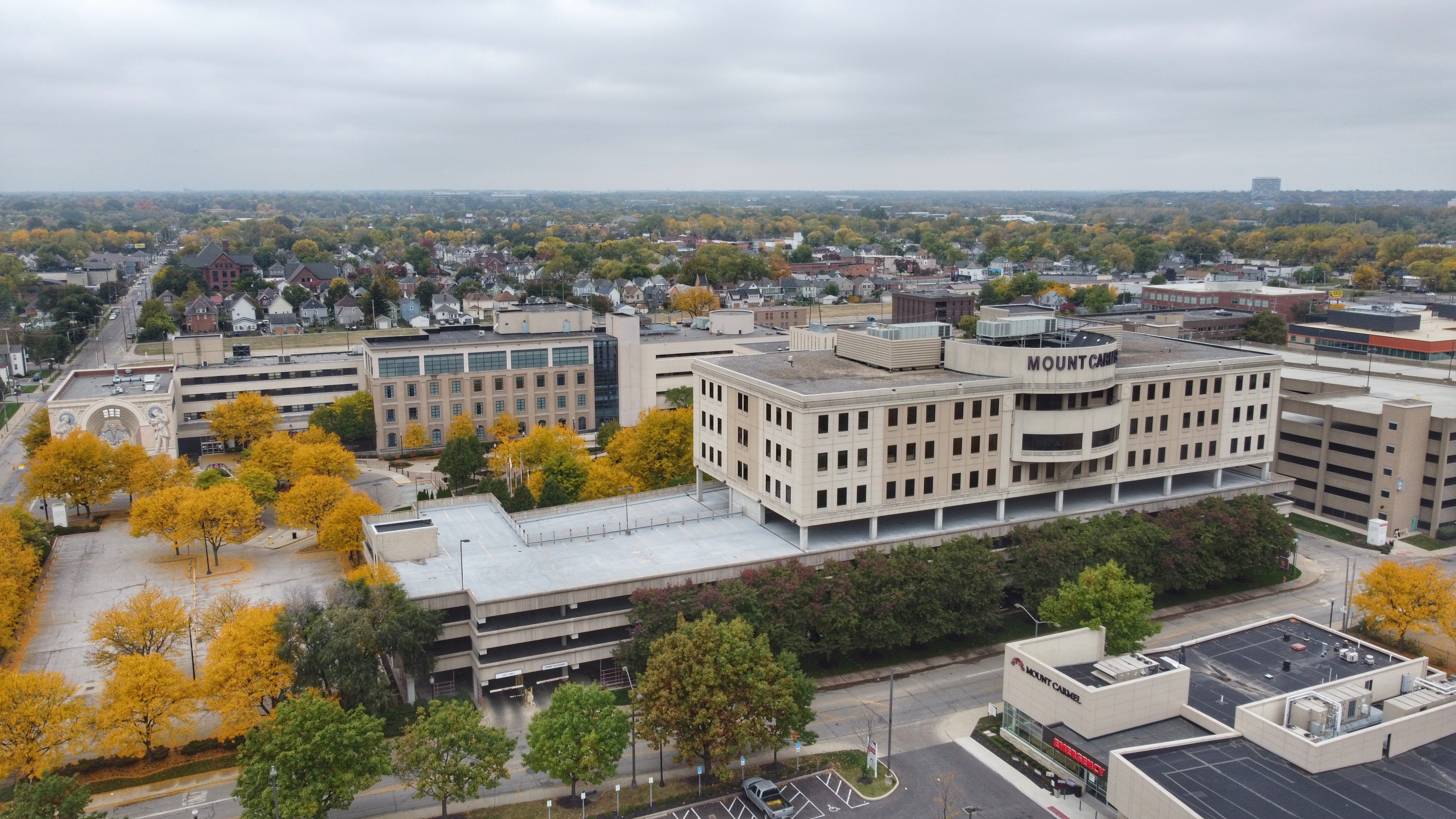
College of Nursing campus in 2020

The Mount Carmel College of Nursing was founded by the Sisters of the Holy Cross in 1903. It has since become one of the largest baccalaureate nursing programs in the state of Ohio. It is still located to this day on the campus of Mount Carmel West. Both freshmen and sophomores are required to live on campus with both coed dorms and single student apartments. Today, it is a private, coeducational and Catholic church affiliated institution with around 1100 full-time students.

It was accredited with the North Central Association of Colleges and Schools (NCA) until that body was dissolved in 2014. It has since maintained accreditation with NCA's successor organization, the Higher Learning Commission. The courses offered on campus include a Bachelor of Science in Nursing, Nursing Administration, Family Nurse Practitioner and Nursing Education, Master of Science in Adult Health, and a Dietetic Internship. During the 100 year anniversary of the College of Nursing it was announced that a Graduate program would be started with a Master of Science degree.

== Services ==
Mount Carmel West was a tertiary hospital with many specialties including:

- Bariatrics
- Cardiology
- Cardiothoracic Surgery
- Colorectal Surgery
- Critical Care
- Emergency Medicine
- Endocrinology
- Endovascular and Vascular Surgery
- ENT
- Family Practice
- Gastroenterology
- General Surgery
- Gynecology
- Infectious Disease
- Internal Medicine
- Nephrology
- Neurology
- Neurosurgery
- Obstetrics
- Oncology (Medical & Surgical)
- Ophthalmology
- Orthopedic Surgery
- Physical Medicine & Rehab
- Plastic Surgery
- Podiatry
- Pulmonology
- Psychiatry (includes inpatient unit)
- Radiology
- Thoracic Surgery
- Urology
- Urogynecology
- Women's Health

== Transformation ==
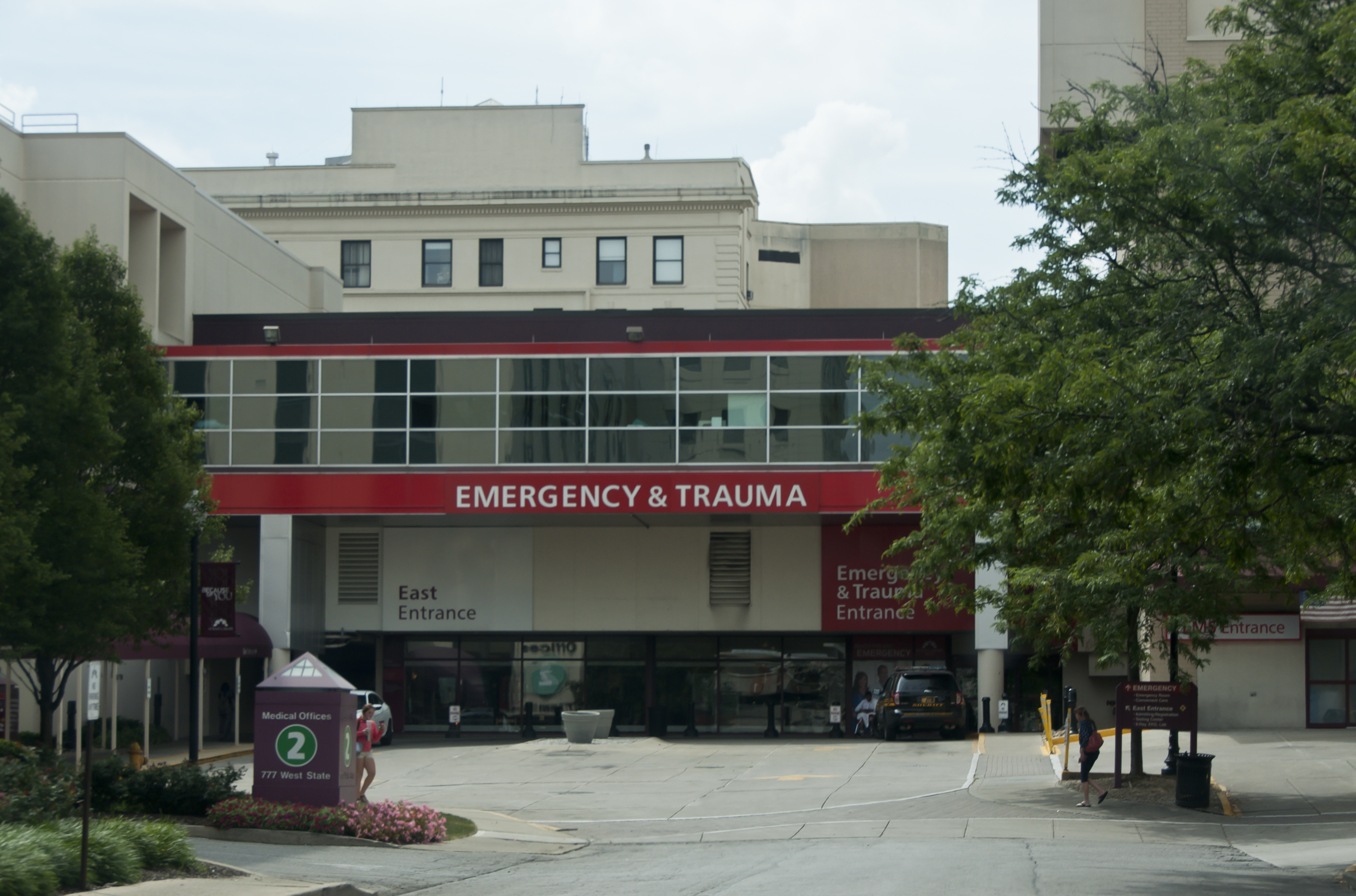
The hospital's emergency department, 2017

In late 2016 a $46 million comprehensive and controversial plan was agreed that will begin in 2019 of the transformation of Mount Carmel West from a full inpatient hospital to a facility based on outpatient services while still retaining a full-service emergency department in a new location on campus. Mount Carmel Health System plans to begin demolishing the majority of Mount Carmel West hospital by spring 2019 with all demolition work to be completed by the end of 2020.

Inpatient services are being moved to a new 210-bed hospital being constructed in Grove City. The Emergency department is being rebuilt in a new location with the Level II Trauma Center being moved to Mt. Carmel East. Plans for how to redevelop the 37-acre campus are still be being finalized while receiving local and community input. The existing plans call for Mount Carmel to keep the four parking garages, some of which directly connect to outpatient offices, and their 2011 parking spaces. The plans call for the equivalent of 1,500 full-time employees will transfer to the Grove City hospital with just 300 staying at Mount Carmel West.

This will also involve the inpatient Psychiatry unit which is being demolished and a new facility to be built on the east side with plans to build a new 80-bed behavioral-health hospital quadrupling the amount of beds at Mount Carmel West.

Investments will also be made to the College of Nursing whose enrollment is expected to grow by 200 to 400 students over the next three to five years from the 1,100 students it currently has enrolled.

Some in the community have welcomed the proposed changes to develop the college of nursing, the possible public park spaces and considerations for affordable housing on the existing hospital grounds. Not everyone in the community have welcomed the possible changes. Some of expressed concern for the amount of full-time staff Mount Carmel will keep in its Mount Carmel West emergency department and about older residents who will soon have to travel longer distances to receive treatment especially in emergencies.

The plan for the West campus is to ensure access to behavioral-health and substance-abuse treatment in Franklinton, and the surrounding area but it was unclear how those services would be provided after the transformation.

== Mount Carmel Medical Group ==
Mount Carmel West was part of Mount Carmel Medical Group, representing more than 250 primary care and specialty care providers. This is a network of providers for care that is not of an emergency nature. The hospital was also affiliated with Mount Carmel Health Partners – a network of up to "1,200 primary care and specialty physicians" – and with Anthem Blue Cross and Blue Shield. This expanded the network of care providers in the central Ohio area that were associated with Mount Carmel, although unlike the situation with providers in the Mount Carmel Health System, items such as medical records may not be transferred automatically.

== Transport ==
The hospital was accessible by public transport via COTA bus services operating throughout metropolitan Columbus, Ohio. Mount Carmel West was also situated between Ohio State Route 16 and U.S. Route 62 and close enough to be seen from Interstate 70 and Ohio State Route 315 allowing for multiple points of access in downtown Columbus. It was also able to be served by a variety of airports in the region supporting medical evacuation flights and an on-site helipad.
