= Mount Carmel Medical Group =

- Company type: Private
- Industry: Health Care
- Founded: 2003
- Defunct: 2014
- Headquarters: Naas, County Kildare, Ireland

Mount Carmel Medical Group was a private healthcare organisation based in Naas, Ireland. Founded in 2003, the group included Aut Even Hospital (Kilkenny), Mount Carmel Hospital (Dublin), and St. Joseph's Hospital (Sligo).

As of 2012, Mount Carmel Medical Group had reported debts of €50m, and was put into "liquidation". Mount Carmel Hospital itself was closed in early 2014, before being taken over by the Health Service Executive in late 2014 and reopened as a public facility in 2015. The group's hospitals in Kilkenny and Belfast were sold in 2015.
