= Mount Carmel Health System =

Health care system in Ohio, United States

- Type: faith-based
- Industry: Health care
- Headquarters: Columbus, Ohio
- Parent: Trinity Health
- Website: www.mountcarmelhealth.com

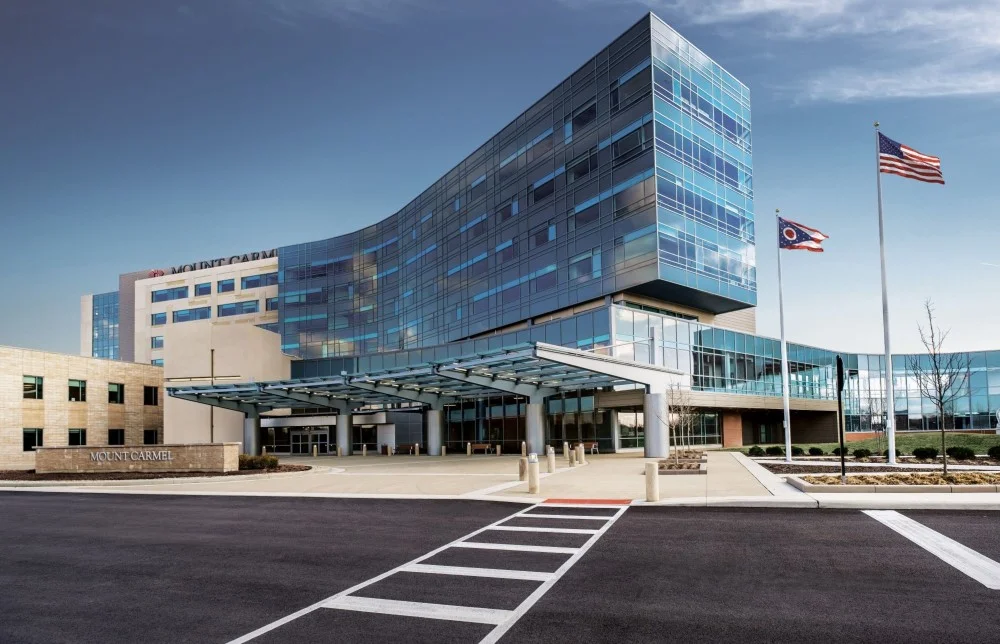
Mount Carmel Grove City

Mount Carmel Health System is a health care system in central Ohio.

== History ==
The Sisters of the Holy Cross opened the original Mount Carmel Hospital in Columbus in 1886.

== Operations ==
The company employs over 8,200 staff and 1,920 physicians in their outpatient facilities and four hospitals. Mount Carmel East opened in 1972 near Reynoldsburg. It was followed by Mount Carmel Grove City in Grove City, Mount Carmel St. Ann's in Westerville, and Mount Carmel New Albany Surgical Hospital in New Albany. Mount Carmel also operates the Medicare Advantage plan MediGold. It opened Columbus CyberKnife in 2010 at Mount Carmel St. Ann's.

Mount Carmel West operated from 1886 to 2019.

The system is the second largest member of its parent company, Trinity Health.

== Partnerships ==
Mount Carmel partners with the for-profit Acadia Healthcare, which operates its Mount Carmel Behavioral Health facility on Columbus's east side.
