= Kingsbridge Private Hospital =

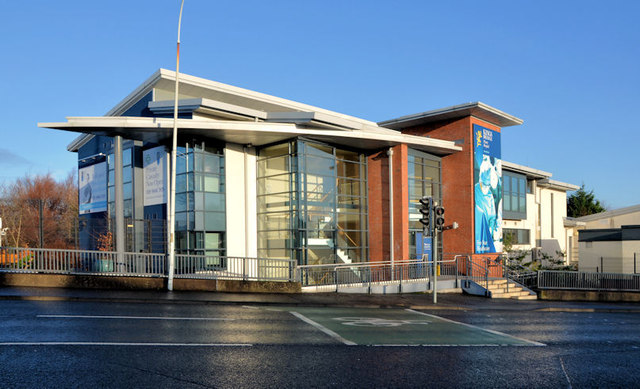
- The hospital in 2014

- Shown in Northern Ireland

Geography
- Location: Belfast, Northern Ireland
- Coordinates: 54.5693°N 5.9697°W

Organisation
- Care system: Private

Services
- Emergency department: No

History
- Founded: 2011

Links
- Website: kingsbridgeprivatehospital.com

Kingsbridge Private Hospital is a private hospital on the Lisburn Road, Belfast, Northern Ireland. It is owned by Kingsbridge Healthcare Group, the largest provider of private healthcare in Northern Ireland.

== History ==
The hospital was established on the Lisburn Road in a building previously used by two failed private clinics in 2011.

It initially concentrated on maternity services. It was used until 2014 to reduce HSC (the equivalent of the NHS within Northern Ireland) waiting lists for routine surgery. In September 2015 the Northern Ireland Health and Social Care Board admitted that waiting lists for surgery had grown and that they did not have the money to pay either NHS providers or the private sector to bring them down. According to Mark Regan, the Chief Executive, this had led to an increase in patients paying for surgery privately, particularly for orthopaedic procedures. Unlike most private hospitals in the UK it provides a minor injury clinic.

It runs the National Sports Clinic, which provides health services for 90,000 Gaelic Athletic Association (GAA) members in Ulster.

A new MRI scanner, Philips Ingenuity 1.5, was installed in August 2015. The hospital charges £400 for a private scan.

The hospital provides primary care services, such as the Meningitis B vaccination which is not provided by the NHS for older children in the province.

The hospital reported a 66% increase in plastic surgery for breast augmentation between 2013 and 2015, the most common plastic surgery they performed.

In 2022 a new Operating Theatre and Intensive Care Unit was opened on the site.
