= Mount Carmel, Ontario =

Mount Carmel, Ontario, may refer to:

- Mount Carmel, Prince Edward County, Ontario, Prince Edward County, Ontario
- Mount Carmel, Essex County, Ontario, Essex County, Ontario
- Mount Carmel, Haldimand County, Ontario
- Mount Carmel, Middlesex County, Ontario
