= Mount Carmel Community Hospital =

Mount Carmel Hospital
- Health Service Executive
- Shown in Dublin

Geography
- Location: Churchtown, Dublin, Ireland
- Coordinates: 53.304587°N 6.265157°W

Organisation
- Care system: Public (formerly private)
- Type: General

History
- Founded: 1950

Links
- Website: mowlamhealthcare.com/mount-carmel-hospital/

Mount Carmel Community Hospital (Irish: Ospidéal Pobail Mount Carmel) is a short-stay rehabilitation hospital in Churchtown, Dublin, Ireland. It was previously the only private maternity hospital in Ireland, albeit it offered other services for most of its history.

== History ==
=== 1950-2006 ===
The hospital was founded by the Sisters of the Little Company of Mary and officially opened by John Charles McQuaid, Archbishop of Dublin, as Mount Carmel Hospital in August 1950. A purpose-built facility was completed in October 1960.

In 2002, the hospital received Joint Commission International accreditation.

=== 2006-2014 ===
It was acquired by Harlequin Healthcare, a company controlled by Gerry Conlan who also owned Aut Even Hospital in Kilkenny and St. Joseph's Hospital, Sligo, for €50 million in July 2006. Following the acquisition, Conlan's business evolved to become Mount Carmel Medical Group. After Conlan's business got into financial difficulties, the National Asset Management Agency took control of the hospital in 2010.

=== 2014-present ===
In January 2014, it was announced that the financial support from National Asset Management Agency propping up the hospital operations was being withdrawn and that the High Court had approved a request to appoint a liquidator. Following the closure of the hospital, the circumstances leading up to the closure were discussed by the Oireachtas Joint Committee on Health and Children on 18 February 2014.

The hospital was bought by the Health Service Executive for a reported €11 million in September 2014. It re-opened as a short-stay rehabilitation hospital known as Mount Carmel Community Hospital in September 2015, operated by Mowlam Healthcare for the Health Service Executive.

== Services ==
Specialities provided include dermatology, dental surgery, otolaryngology (ENT), general surgery, urology, obstetrics and gynaecology, ophthalmology, orthopaedics, pathology, plastic surgery, physiotherapy, and radiology.
