= City of London Academy Highgate Hill =

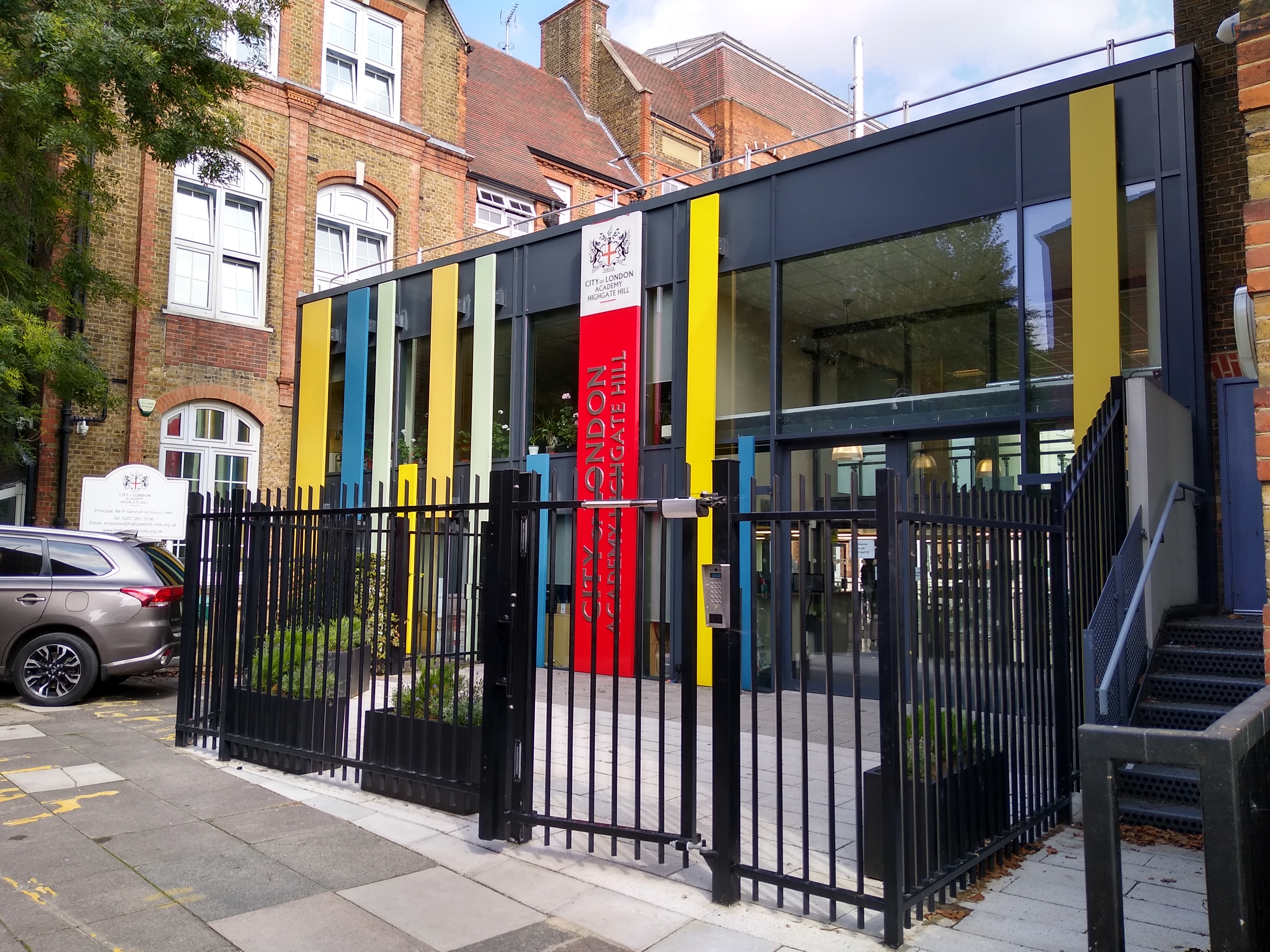

Location
- Holland Walk; Duncombe Road; Islington; London, N19 3EU; England; 51°34′05″N 0°07′47″W

Information
- Other names: COLAHH; ICS
- Type: Academy
- Established: September 2017
- Local authority: Islington
- Trust: City of London Academies Trust
- Department for Education URN: 143659 Tables
- Ofsted: Reports
- Principal: Prince Gennuh
- Gender: Mixed
- Age: 11 to 18
- Enrolment: 662 (2024)
- Houses: LSE · ICL · UCL · KCL · QMUL
- Website: www.highgatehill.cola.org.uk

City of London Academy Highgate Hill (referred to simply as COLAHH) is an 11-18 mixed secondary school and sixth form in the Islington area of London, England. It was established in September 2017, with Prince Gennuh as headteacher, after taking over from Mount Carmel Catholic College for Girls. The school achieved amongst the best A Level results in London in 2024, ranking in the top 1% in the country for value-added performance in several subjects. It has been described as "more rigorous than Eton".

== History ==
The site of the current school was previously known as Mount Carmel Catholic College for Girls. Mount Carmel was a Roman Catholic, girls-only school. It was originally located in Eden Grove, Holloway before moving to the present location. The school formally closed on 31 August 2017.

The next day City of London Academy Highgate Hill opened on the same site. City of London Academy Highgate Hill is a free school sponsored by the City of London Academies Trust.

In its first cohort of students inherited from Mount Carmel, the school achieved a 99% GCSE pass rate, with 67% at Grade 4 and above and nearly 25% of all Grades being 8 and 9.

COLAHH announced plans to expand its capacity by 200 pupils in 2021. The proposals were in part to facilitate post-16 provision at the school, with the intent to operate at a capacity of 150 sixth form students per year.

In 2022, the school's sixth form welcomed its first cohort of students, albeit in temporary accommodation nearby. Students moved to the new building in early 2024 after work had been completed.

In May 2024, COLAHH was rated "Good" by Ofsted and the sixth form provision was rated "Outstanding".

The school is partnered with MUFG as part of their "Young Minds, Brighter Futures" program. A Fun Run was organised in June 2024 to raise money for the school, accumulating £41,680 in donations.

== Academic profile ==
In its first set of GCSE results after COVID, the school achieved a 98% pass rate with 63% at Grade 4 and above and 47% at Grade 5 and above. The average A-Level grade achieved was an A−, with 59% of entries being awarded A*- A and 85% A*- B. COLAHH achieved the highest A-Level grades in Islington, and ranked as one of the highest state schools in London overall.
