= List of hospitals in Northern Ireland =

The following is a list of currently operating hospitals in Northern Ireland.

== County Antrim ==
=== Belfast ===
- Belfast City Hospital
- Knockbracken Healthcare Park
- Mater Infirmorum Hospital
- Musgrave Park Hospital
- Royal Belfast Hospital for Sick Children
- Royal Jubilee Maternity Hospital
- Royal Victoria Hospital

=== Others ===
- Antrim Area Hospital, Antrim
- Braid Valley Care Complex, Ballymena
- Dalriada Hospital, Ballycastle
- Holywell Hospital, Antrim
- Lagan Valley Hospital, Lisburn
- Moyle Hospital, Larne
- Muckamore Abbey Hospital
- Robinson Hospital, Ballymoney
- Whiteabbey Hospital, Newtownabbey

=== Former ===
- Belvoir Park Hospital, Belfast
- Shaftesbury Square Hospital, Belfast
- Forster Green Hospital, Belfast

== County Armagh ==
- Armagh Community Hospital, Armagh
- Craigavon Area Hospital, Portadown
- Lurgan Hospital, Lurgan
- St Luke's Hospital, Armagh
- Daisy Hill Hospital, Newry

== County Down ==
- Ards Community Hospital, Newtownards
- Bangor Community Hospital, Bangor
- Downe Hospital, Downpatrick
- Ulster Hospital, Dundonald

=== Former ===
- Banbridge Hospital

== County Fermanagh ==
- South West Acute Hospital, Enniskillen

=== Former ===
- Erne Hospital, Enniskillen

== County Londonderry ==
=== Derry ===
- Altnagelvin Area Hospital
- Grangewood Hospital
- Lakeview Hospital
- Waterside Hospital

=== Other ===
- Causeway Hospital, Coleraine
- Mid-Ulster Hospital, Magherafelt

=== Former ===
- Gransha Hospital
- Roe Valley Hospital, Limavady

== County Tyrone ==
- Omagh Hospital and Primary Care Complex, Omagh
- South Tyrone Hospital, Dungannon
- Tyrone and Fermanagh Hospital, Omagh

=== Former ===
- Tyrone County Hospital

== Non-NHS hospitals in Northern Ireland ==
- Fitzwilliam Clinic, Belfast
- Hillsborough Clinic, Hillsborough
- Kingsbridge Private Hospital, Belfast
- Kingsbridge Private Hospital North West, Ballykelly
- Ulster Independent Clinic, Belfast
