= Runwood Homes =

Care home group

- Industry: Residential nursing care
- Founder: Gordon Sanders
- Website: runwoodhomes.co.uk

Runwood Homes is a British care home group based in Essex and founded by its owner Gordon Sanders. In January 2023, it was the UK’s sixth largest for-profit care home group. As of January 2023 it provided a total of 5,000 beds, and 62 of its homes cared for residents with dementia.

== Finances ==
In 2017, Sanders drew a salary of 2.1 million pounds sterling as Runwood Homes' highest paid director.

The company paid a total of £57 million in directors’ salaries and dividends from 2018 to 2022. In 2020 and 2021, Runwood accepted government grants related to the COVID-19 pandemic for infection control and job retention totalling £12.3 million. During the same span of time, it awarded salary and dividends to its highest paid director totalling approximately £14.3 million. Runwood Homes accepted £2 million in furlough pay and COVID-19 grants in 2020. Its underlying profit margin widened by 37% to a profit before tax of £25.4 million the same year, the largest rise in profit margins among the 10 biggest adult social care providers in the UK. Sanders received extra £2 million in dividends in 2020, increasing his total pay that year to £3 million. In June 2022, the company "invested £7.2 million in providing new and upgraded homes during the year." In January 2023, The Guardian reported that Sanders had paid himself £21 million over five years.

== Care homes ==
From 2018 to 2022, the majority of the 60 dementia care homes under Runwood were rated "good" by Care Quality Commission (CQC) inspectors, with almost a third being rated as "requires improvement". In 2022, the CQC had rated a quarter of its homes as requiring improvement.

=== England ===
==== Mulberry Court, Luton ====
Runwood Homes' Mulberry Court home in Luton specialises in care for residents with dementia, physical disabilities and sensory impairments. A May 2018 report concerning the care home led to the CQC placing it into special measures. Luton Borough Council began an "urgent" investigation after one resident suffered abuse at the home, including bruising to his face and arms. A March 2019 report by the CQC rated the home "inadequate" in all aspects, including its safety, effectiveness, caring, responsiveness and leadership. Runwood Homes stated that it had "failed in terms of dignity within that particular service," and had put in place a "very clear and robust action plan" to remedy the issues.

==== Windmill House, Norfolk ====
In January 2022, a woman was taken to hospital from the Runwood home Windmill House in Wymondham, Norfolk after its staff copied the wrong person's details into her care plan in the weeks before she died. In response, a coroner issued a Prevention of Future Deaths report. In July 2023, the same care home was put into special measures after the CQC downgraded it from a rating of 'requires improvement' to 'inadequate', giving it six months to improve.

=== Northern Ireland ===
Runwood Homes ran a number of homes in Northern Ireland. In 2021, the company Kathryn Homes was established to manage the 12 homes that had been owned by Runwood until that point.

==== Clifton Nursing Home, Belfast ====
Nine COVID-19 related deaths were reported on 25 May 2020 at Clifton Nursing Home in north Belfast. After multiple failed inspections by the Regulation and Quality Improvement Authority (RQIA) which had ongoing concerns about the home concerning governance, management and leadership, a number of residents were relocated from the home the same month. Runwood reached an agreement with Healthcare Ireland, which took over management of the home in "an interim management arrangement".

==== Dunmurry Manor, Belfast ====
In November 2016 the Police Service of Northern Ireland began investigating a report of neglect at Dunmurry Manor (later renamed Oak Tree Manor), a Belfast care home run by Runwood Homes since 2014, in which a worker at the home told police that residents were being locked inside their rooms. The case was referred to the South Eastern Trust in December 2016, and new admissions to the home were suspended. The Trust then referred the matter to Dunmury Manor for an internal investigation. The decision of the police to refer the investigation to the Trust was later criticized by experts, though the police stated that it had not investigated because "there was no criminal evidence."

A second investigation of the home was launched in February 2017 by the Commissioner for Older People for Northern Ireland (COPNI) after the home received three failure to comply notices from the RQIA and other health trusts. In June 2018, the Commissioner reported a "horrific catalogue of inhuman and degrading treatment" which dated back to 2014, with residents "spending their last few months living in appalling circumstances." Runwood Homes issued an apology. A company spokesperson stated that Logan Logeswaran, the company's managing director, had resigned due to the findings of the report, though Logeswaran later stated that he resigned for unlinked personal reasons. Sanders later stated that the findings of the report had been "flawed" and "inaccurate", and insisted that the cases were "isolated".

In August 2018, police began a criminal investigation into the allegations of mistreatment in the 2018 COPNI report, and in March 2019 began examining the cases of 183 families of residents who lived in the home between June 2014 and July 2017. COPNI published another report in March 2022 which found that Runwood Homes "did not seek to engage" with relatives "to fully understand their complaints". Health Minister Robin Swann stated that residents were "badly let down" by the compliaints procedures at the home. Control of the home, renamed Oak Tree Manor, was taken over by new company Kathryn Homes in 2021.

==== Glenabbey Manor, County Antrim ====
A Runwood home in Glengormley, County Antrim recorded 14 COVID-19 related deaths in May 2020. In October 2020, police and the Northern Health and Social Care Trust launched a joint investigation into the home after claims of a breach of COVID-19 legislation, which they stated was unrelated to the May deaths. In November 2021, the Commissioner for Older People called for a public enquiry into the May deaths, and former employees of the care home spoke about their experiences, with some stating that residents had been discharged to the home without being tested for the disease.

==== Rose Court, County Antrim ====
In September 2018, a resident was discharged from Runwood Homes' Rose Court in Ballymena, County Antrim less than 12 hours after she had fallen down in the home and had been taken to Antrim Area Hospital. This was due to the home being changed into a full residential home without a nursing unit, as a result of a "shortage of nursing staff." A number of nurses at the home had resigned the previous month, forcing the re-designation of the home.
