= Whiteabbey Hospital =

- Northern Health and Social Care Trust
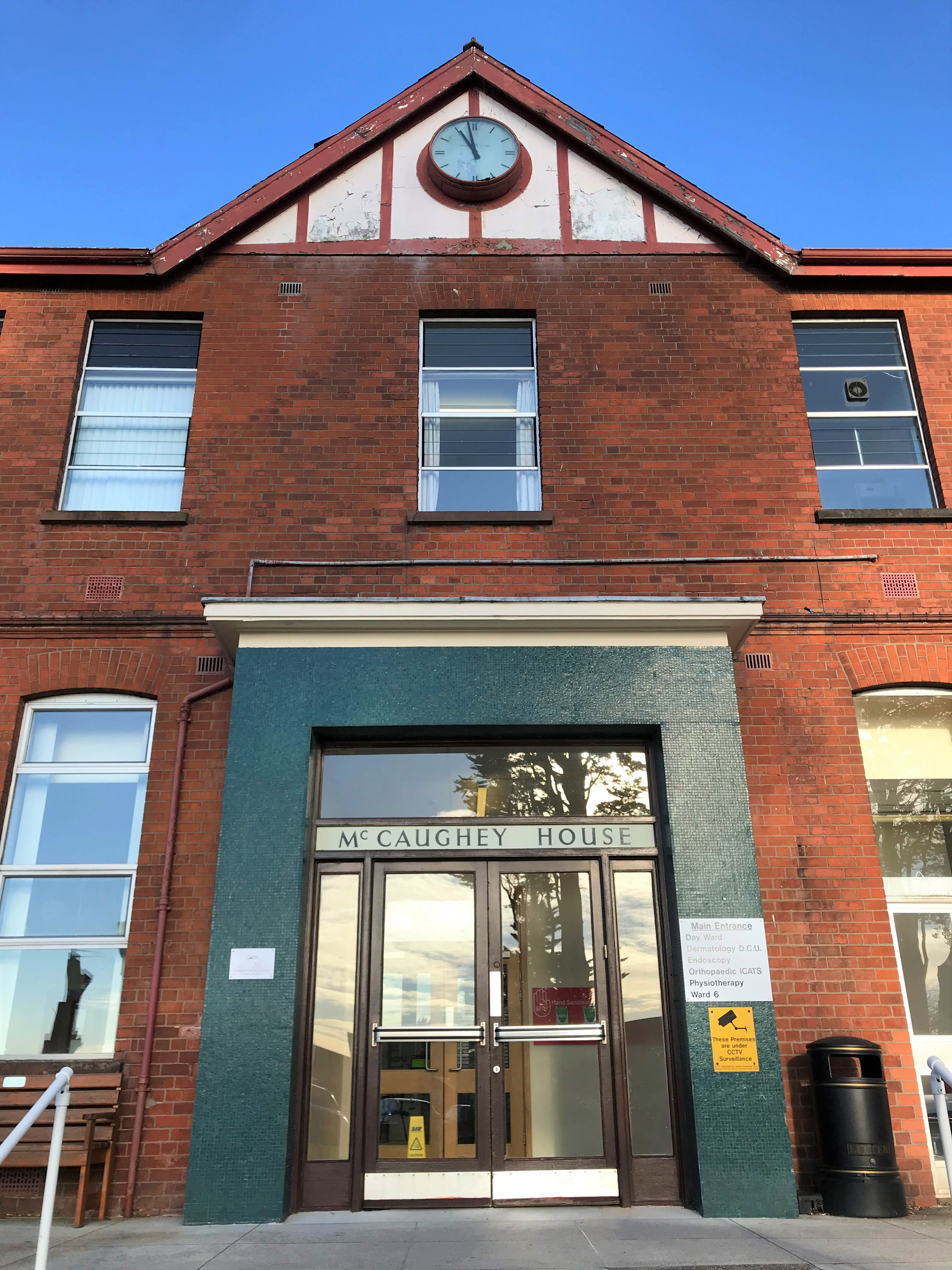
- Entrance to McCaughey House, 2019

- Shown in Northern Ireland

Geography
- Location: Doagh Road, Newtownabbey, Northern Ireland, United Kingdom
- Coordinates: 54°40′20″N 5°54′34″W

Organisation
- Care system: Health and Social Care in Northern Ireland
- Type: Non-acute Hospital

Services
- Emergency department: No Accident & Emergency

History
- Founded: 1907

Links
- Website: www.northerntrust.hscni.net/hospitals/311.htm
- Lists: Hospitals in the United Kingdom

Whiteabbey Hospital is a hospital located close to the village of Whiteabbey, within the town of Newtownabbey, Northern Ireland. The hospital first opened in 1907 as The Abbey Sanitorium, centred around a country house known as 'The Abbey'. The house has stood on the site from 1850, and was once the residence of prominent architect Charles Lanyon. The hospital was extended and several buildings added throughout the early 20th century, and it was renamed Whiteabbey Hospital in 1947. The hospital is managed by the Northern Health and Social Care Trust. Many healthcare services have been withdrawn from the hospital, most recently with the closure of the Minor Injuries Unit in 2014.

== History ==
=== The Abbey, Whiteabbey ===
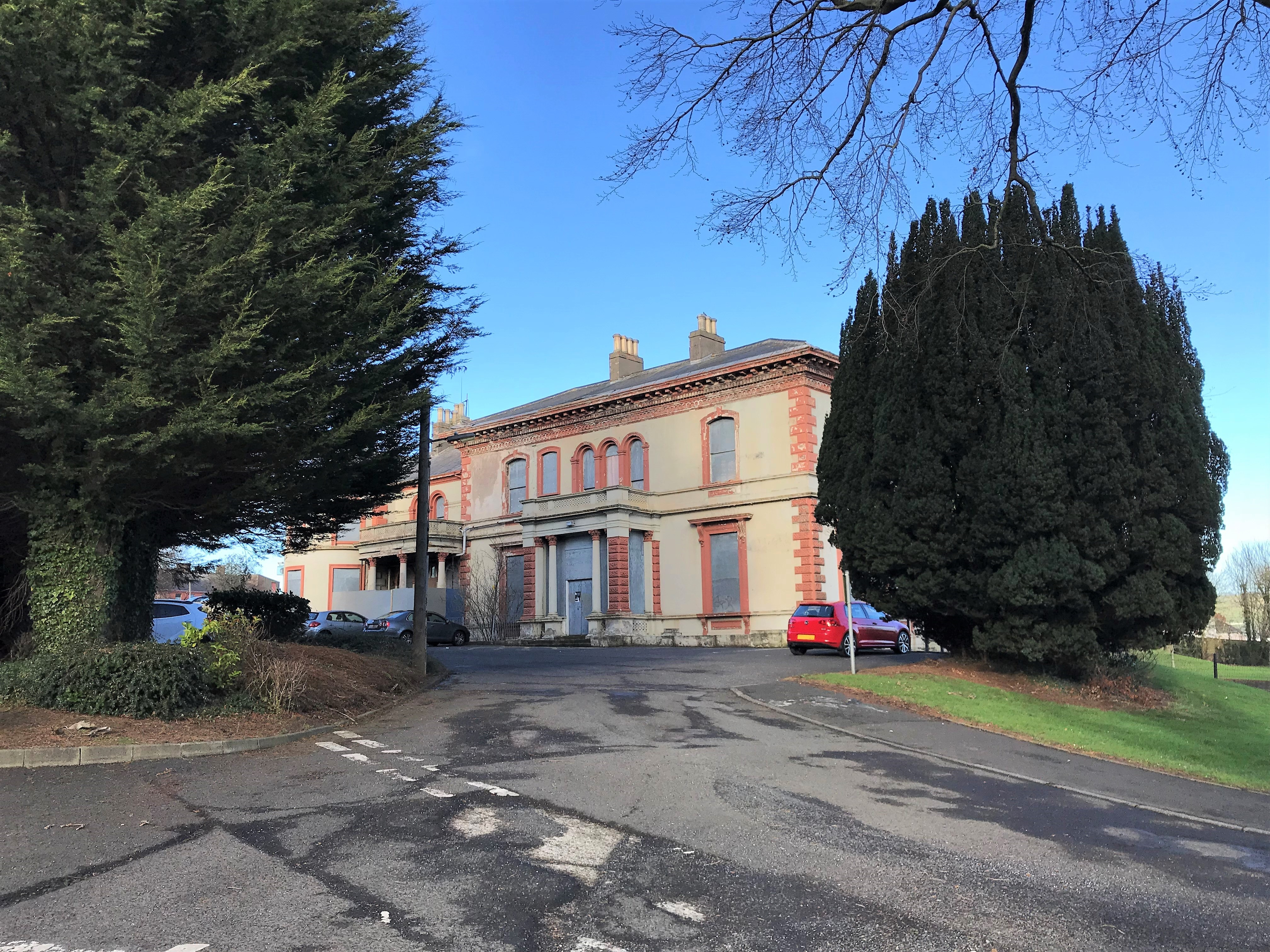
The Abbey, located within the grounds of Whiteabbey Hospital.

The Abbey was designed by the renowned architect Charles Lanyon in 1850 for Richard Davison, the Conservative MP for Belfast at the time. The house is a large two storey mansion with an Italian architectural style. Charles Lanyon bought the house himself in 1862 and lived in the house with his family until his death in 1889. Following Lanyon's death, the house was sold at auction in Belfast, and lay derelict until 1897 when it was purchased by the Granville Hotel Company, who intended to convert the house into a private tuberculosis treatment centre. By the turn of the century, tuberculosis was the most pressing health problem in the UK and Ireland, but the hospitals of the time were unable to cope with the volume of patients who had the disease. Most TB patients were nursed in cramped, crowded hospital wards. It was soon realised that Belfast needed a dedicated hospital for the treatment of tuberculosis, and in 1904 The Abbey was purchased by Belfast Union to function as a sanitorium.

=== Whiteabbey Sanitorium ===
Plans were drawn up to build 4 pavilions and a two-storey hospital block to accommodate 265 patients, with work commencing in March 1906. The Abbey was converted into an administration block with accommodation for doctors and nurses also provided. The sanitorium opened in 1907 as an auxiliary workhouse for the treatment of tuberculosis. The 1907 annual report for 'The Abbey Sanitorium for pulmonary tuberculosis' stated that 311 patients were treated at the hospital, and 31 of those patients had died over the course of the year. The visiting physician (doctor in charge) at the time was Robert Hall, who had first suggested in 1900 it would be better for tuberculosis patients to be treated in their own specialised hospital. On 1 October 1913, the management of the sanitorium was transferred to Belfast Corporation (Belfast City Council), who decided to rename the hospital 'Belfast Municipal Sanitorium' to reflect its role as the main treatment centre for tuberculosis in Belfast. The numbers of patients treated at Whiteabbey each year grew steadily with 519 patients admitted in 1928, and the average duration of residence lasting 176 days.

By the 1930s it had become clear that the pavilions were unsuitable for nursing seriously ill patients, and widespread criticism was made of the standard of care received by some patients. In 1941 a six-month inquiry identified a catalogue of failings at the sanitorium, blaming the Belfast Corporation for its poor management of the facility. In 1943, Brice Clark was appointed chief physician, and in 1946 the newly established Northern Ireland Tuberculosis Authority took over the running of the sanitorium. The sanitorium was renamed Whiteabbey Hospital in 1947.

==== Whiteabbey Hospital School ====
An open air school existed within the grounds of the hospital, allowing the children to continue their education and spend time outside in the fresh air, which at the time was one of the main treatments available for tuberculosis. The school was closed in 1949, with the remaining pupils transferred to the school at Crawfordsburn Hospital, a nearby children's hospital. The number of children residing at Whiteabbey hospital increased following the school's closure, and in 1954 the school was re-established until the children's tuberculosis ward was closed in 1968.

=== Expansion ===
In the years that followed, in part due to the formation of the NHS in 1948, patients other than those with tuberculosis were treated at the hospital, with a particular focus on respiratory disease. Land adjacent to the existing hospital site was purchased in 1951 to allow future expansion of the existing hospital site to take place. In 1959 control of the hospital was transferred to the Northern Ireland Hospitals Authority. It was decided that the rapidly expanding population of Newtownabbey required a general hospital, so the main hospital building underwent substantial refurbishment and extension to become suitably equipped to provide general medical and surgical care. This modern facility opened in 1964 and was renamed McCaughey House. The operating theatres which had been opened in 1956 were also modernised at this time. By this time 'The Abbey' was being used exclusively as an administration building, and it also underwent repairs in 1967. The number of tuberculosis patients had steadily declined over the years, and in August 1968 the last few TB patients were transferred to Forster Green Hospital in south Belfast.

As the hospital increased in size it became apparent that a large, modern nurse's accommodation block would be required to ensure the hospital was adequately staffed. The new nurse's home and a school of nursing were opened in 1969. The nurse's home was named Norah Bain House, after a Sister Tutor who worked at the hospital for many years. An Outpatient's department building was opened in 1972, followed by a Casualty and X-Ray department which although completed in 1974, didn't open until 1975 due to staff shortages.

=== Recent Years ===
With the opening of Antrim Area Hospital in 1993, it was inevitable that some services would be centralised and withdrawn from Whiteabbey Hospital. Several wards and services were either closed or relocated to other hospitals, including the inpatient surgical unit, which was relocated to Antrim in 2009. The accident and emergency department was downgraded to a minor injuries unit in May 2010, with this facility ultimately closing in December 2014.

The Northern Ireland Hospice temporarily relocated to one of the disused wards in the grounds of the hospital in November 2012 whilst its Somerton House site was rebuilt. Some of the disused buildings at the hospital have been used by production companies, with scenes for TV series The Fall, starring Gillian Anderson and Jamie Dornan, being filmed here in 2012.

It was proposed in August 2017 that two rehabilitation wards consisting of 44 beds were to be closed as part of £70 million budget cuts across the Northern Ireland health service, but these plans were shelved following public consultation.

== Services ==
Woodlands Wellness Hub is a facility offering adults with mental health conditions the opportunity to take part in a range of recovery programmes. It aims to support people on leaving hospital and to prevent admission to hospital.
