= Mid-Ulster Hospital =

Local general hospital in Magherafelt

- Northern Health and Social Care Trust
- Location in Northern Ireland

Geography
- Location: Magherafelt, County Londonderry, Northern Ireland
- Coordinates: 54.7617°N 6.6167°W

Organisation
- Care system: Health and Social Care in Northern Ireland
- Type: District General

Services
- Emergency department: Minor injuries unit

History
- Founded: 1842

Links
- Website: www.northerntrust.hscni.net/hospitals/307.htm
- Lists: Hospitals in Northern Ireland

Mid-Ulster Hospital is a local general hospital in Magherafelt, County Londonderry, Northern Ireland. It is managed by the Northern Health and Social Care Trust.

== History ==
The hospital has its origins in the Magherafelt Union Workhouse and Infirmary which was designed by George Wilkinson and completed in 1842. A fever hospital was built on the site in 1847. The infirmary became Magherafelt and District Hospital in August 1945 and subsequently evolved to become the Mid-Ulster Hospital. In February 2003 the hospital was designated as a local hospital in support of the network of nine acute hospitals in Northern Ireland on which healthcare would be focused under the government health policy 'Developing Better Services'. The maternity department closed in 2006 and the accident & emergency department was closed (losing the hospital its acute status) and replaced with a minor injuries unit in 2010.
