= Musgrave Park Hospital =

- Belfast Health and Social Care Trust
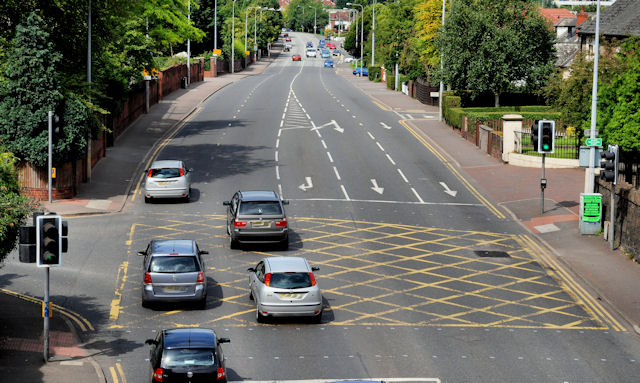
- Entrance to the hospital (on the left)

- Location in Northern Ireland

Geography
- Location: Ballygammon, Belfast, County Antrim, Northern Ireland, United Kingdom
- Coordinates: 54°34′03″N 5°58′37″W

Organisation
- Care system: Health and Social Care in Northern Ireland
- Type: Specialist
- Affiliated university: Queen's University Belfast

Services
- Speciality: Orthopaedics, Rheumatology, Acquired Brain Injury Unit, Sports Medicine

History
- Founded: 1920

Links
- Website: www.belfasttrust.hscni.net/hospitals/MusgraveParkHospital.htm
- Lists: Hospitals in Northern Ireland

Musgrave Park Hospital is a specialist hospital in Belfast, Northern Ireland. It specialises in orthopaedics, rheumatology, sports medicine and rehabilitation of patients of all ages. These specialties are spread out across a large site in the leafy suburbs of South Belfast. The hospital is named after the 48 acres (19 ha) of adjacent municipal parkland known as Musgrave Park, first opened to the public in 1920. The hospital is managed by the Belfast Health and Social Care Trust.

== History ==
The hospital opened in 1920. The United States Army constructed nissen huts on the site during the Second World War to create a temporary base for soldiers preparing to take part in the Normandy Landings.

The hospital has played its part in the history of The Troubles. On 15 December 1980, Sean McKenna, one of the original seven hunger strikers was moved to Musgrave Park Hospital.

On 2 November 1991, a bomb planted by the Provisional IRA exploded in the Military Wing at Musgrave Park hospital. Two soldiers were killed (one Royal Army Medical Corps, named Phil Cross, the other Royal Corps of Transport, named Craig Pantry) and 11 other people were injured, among them a five-year-old girl and a baby of four months. The 20 lb (9.1 kg) of Semtex exploded in a service tunnel connecting the Withers block, containing orthopaedic and children's wards and the Military Wing. The dead and injured were watching a rugby match on television in the Military Wing's social club.

The original military nissen huts, which had housed various hospital departments during their lifetime, were demolished to make way for the new Regional Acquired Brain Injury Unit which opened in 2006.

== Hospital Services ==
Hospital services include:

=== Specialist units ===
- The Orthopaedics Unit (the Withers Wards) makes the hospital one of the leading orthopaedic and musculoskeletal centres of excellence in Europe. It consists of 6 orthopaedic wards; 4 adult, 1 children and 1 ward specialising in spinal injuries. The wards are named for Mr. J Withers, orthopaedic surgeon and one of the founders of the Northern Ireland Council for Orthopaedic Development.
- The Rheumatology Unit treats people with bone and joint disease. It is the leading centre for the treatment of rheumatic disease in Northern Ireland.
- The Diagnostic Imaging Services Unit offers a new (second) full-body MRI scanner which aims to scan an additional 5,500 patients each year.
- The Duke of Connaught Unit is a Medical Unit primarily serving military personnel based in Northern Ireland.

=== Rehabilitation ===
- Meadowlands is a rehabilitation unit which specialises in Care of Old People. It has a particular focus on the rehabilitation of patients following fractures.
- The MITRE Trust Rehabilitation Unit (MRU) was officially opened in May 2005 by Ireland Rugby player, David Humphreys. The 40,000 ft^{2} building cost £3.5 million to build and is purpose-built to provide regional orthopaedic and rehabilitation physiotherapy services. Musgrave Park also boasts a custom hip-manufacturing unit on-site, one of only five such facilities in the world.
- The Acquired Brain Injury Unit was opened by the Prince of Wales and the Duchess of Cornwall on 14 May 2006. The £9 million pound state-of-the-art complex provides specialist care and intensive rehabilitation physiotherapy for 25 inpatients and 15 outpatients with traumatic brain injuries. These patients were previously being treated in Forster Green Hospital. The centre is also surrounded by high quality landscaped gardens designed to play a role in healing and patient rehabilitation.
