= Lagan Valley (disambiguation) =

The Lagan Valley is a valley in Northern Ireland between Belfast and Lisburn.

Lagan Valley may also refer to:

- Lagan Valley (Assembly constituency), a current constituency in the Northern Ireland Assembly (since 1996)
- Lagan Valley (UK Parliament constituency), a current constituency in the Westminster parliament (since 1983)
- Lagan Valley (Northern Ireland Parliament constituency), a constituency in the former Parliament of Northern Ireland (1969–1973)
- Lagan Valley Hospital, in Lisburn, Northern Ireland
