= Craigavon Area Hospital =

- Southern Health and Social Care Trust
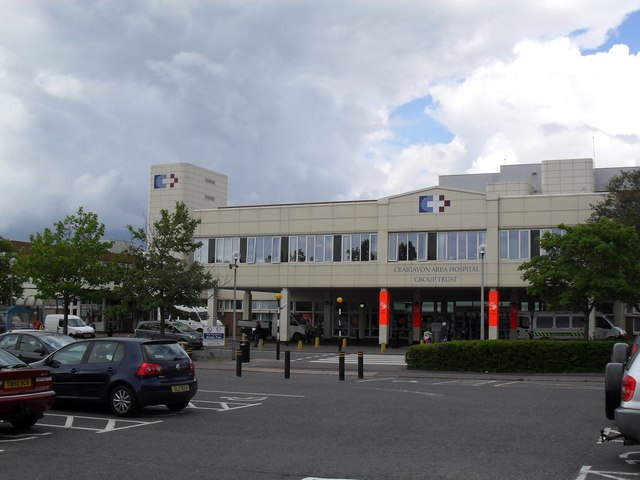
- Entrance to Craigavon Area Hospital

- Location in Northern Ireland

Geography
- Location: Portadown, Craigavon, Northern Ireland, United Kingdom
- Coordinates: 54.4349°N 6.4103°W

Organisation
- Care system: Health and Social Care in Northern Ireland
- Type: Teaching hospital
- Affiliated university: Queens University, Belfast

Services
- Emergency department: Yes (Trauma Centre)
- Beds: 450

History
- Founded: 1972

Links
- Website: www.southerntrust.hscni.net/1539.htm
- Lists: Hospitals in Northern Ireland

Craigavon Area Hospital is a large teaching hospital in Portadown, Craigavon, County Armagh, Northern Ireland. It is the main Hospital in the South of Northern Ireland and serves an estimated 241,000 people from the boroughs/districts of Craigavon, Banbridge, Armagh and Dungannon–South Tyrone. It is managed by the Southern Health and Social Care Trust and is located within the townland of Lisnisky, beside the A27 road, at the north-eastern edge of Portadown.

== History ==
The hospital, which was commissioned to take on acute services previously carried out at Carleton House, Lurgan Hospital and Banbridge Hospital, opened in 1972. In February 2003 the hospital was designated as one of the nine acute hospitals in the acute hospital network of Northern Ireland on which healthcare would be focused under the government health policy 'Developing Better Services'.

It was granted University Teaching Hospital status by Queen's University Belfast in June 2011 and a new pediatric ward, built at a cost of £7 million, opened in October 2017.

== Ambulance services ==
The Southern Division of the Northern Ireland Ambulance Service (NIAS) is headquartered at the Ambulance Station that is located within the hospital grounds.
