= Lagan Valley Hospital =

- South Eastern Health and Social Care Trust
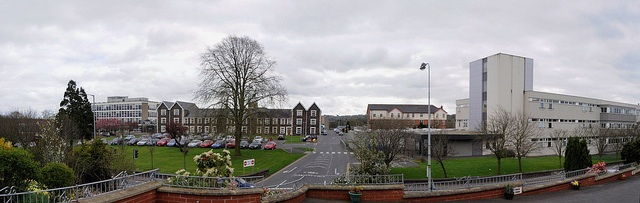
- Panoramic view of Lagan Valley Hospital, Lisburn

- Location in Northern Ireland

Geography
- Location: Lisburn, County Antrim/Down, Northern Ireland, United Kingdom
- Coordinates: 54.50599°N 6.04590°W

Organisation
- Care system: Health and Social Care in Northern Ireland
- Type: District General

Services
- Emergency department: Yes, A&E daytime only since 2011

History
- Founded: 1947

Links
- Website: www.setrust.hscni.net/hospitals/1984.htm
- Lists: Hospitals in Northern Ireland

The Lagan Valley Hospital is a hospital in Lisburn, County Antrim, Northern Ireland. It provides services to people from Greater Lisburn, the Lisburn City Council area and other parts of South East Ulster. It is managed by the South Eastern Health and Social Care Trust.

== History ==
The hospital has its origins in the Lisburn Union Workhouse and Infirmary that opened during the famine in 1841. It became the Lisburn and Hillsborough District Hospital in 1921. After a major extension, the hospital was renamed Lagan Valley Hospital in 1947. Following the closure of the geriatric units at Killowen and Lissue in the 1980s, further expansion took place.

In February 2008, the trust announced that maternity services were to cease at the hospital in 2009. The decision sparked major controversy and heralded the 'Save our Services' campaign, which was backed by local politicians and local newspaper, the Ulster Star. The move was part of measures to cut costs; however it has been claimed that the closure will put other hospitals in the region into 'meltdown'. A senior member of maternity liaison committee stated that it would have a 'detrimental impact', as hospitals in Belfast and Craigavon were already 'bursting'. Such claims were rejected by Health minister Michael McGimpsey, who deemed them 'unhelpful'. The closure came only two years after the decision to strip the hospital of acute services.

Similar controversy was caused by limiting the opening hours of the accident and emergency unit to daytime hours of 8.00am to 8.00pm in 2011. Local politicians and members of the community complained vociferously about the limited opening hours and demanded a full accident and emergency service be restored, and although it was reported in June 2012 that Health Minister Edwin Poots was poised to restore a comprehensive service, this never happened.
