= British health service =

There is no single British Health Service. However, England, Scotland, Wales and Northern Ireland each has a separate public healthcare system that is commonly referred to as the National Health Service or NHS.

- National Health Service (England)
- NHS Scotland
- NHS Wales
- Health and Social Care in Northern Ireland
