= South Tyrone Hospital =

- Southern Health and Social Care Trust
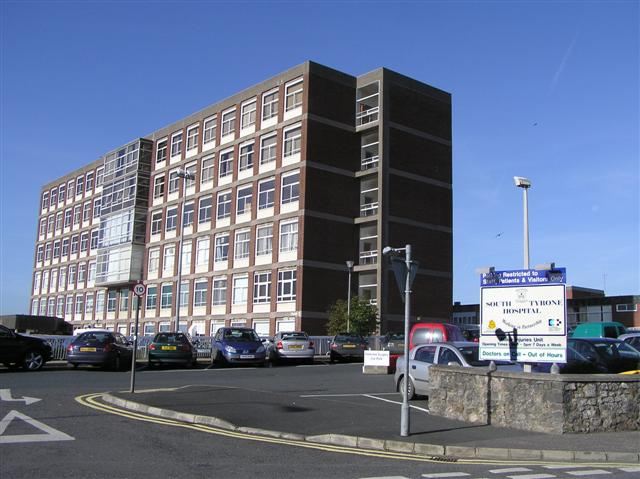
- Tower block at South Tyrone Hospital

- Location in Northern Ireland

Geography
- Location: Dungannon, County Tyrone, Northern Ireland
- Coordinates: 54.5100°N 6.7687°W

Organisation
- Care system: Health and Social Care in Northern Ireland
- Type: District General

Services
- Emergency department: Minor injuries unit
- Beds: 150

History
- Founded: 1842

Links
- Website: www.southerntrust.hscni.net/SouthTyroneHospital.htm
- Lists: Hospitals in Northern Ireland

South Tyrone Hospital is a district general hospital located in Dungannon, County Tyrone, Northern Ireland. It is managed by the Southern Health and Social Care Trust.

== History ==
The hospital originated as the Dungannon Union Workhouse and Infirmary, designed by George Wilkinson, and opened in 1842. A fever hospital was added to the site in 1846. Over time, the infirmary evolved into South Tyrone Hospital and, in the 1960s, a distinctive red-brick tower block was erected—a feature that remains prominent today.

== Services ==
As well as the usual range of services provided by a district general hospital, South Tyrone Hospital has a minor injuries unit.

== See also ==
- Health and Social Care in Northern Ireland
- List of hospitals in Northern Ireland
