= Braid Valley Care Complex =

Hospital and care centre in Northern Ireland

- Northern Health and Social Care Trust
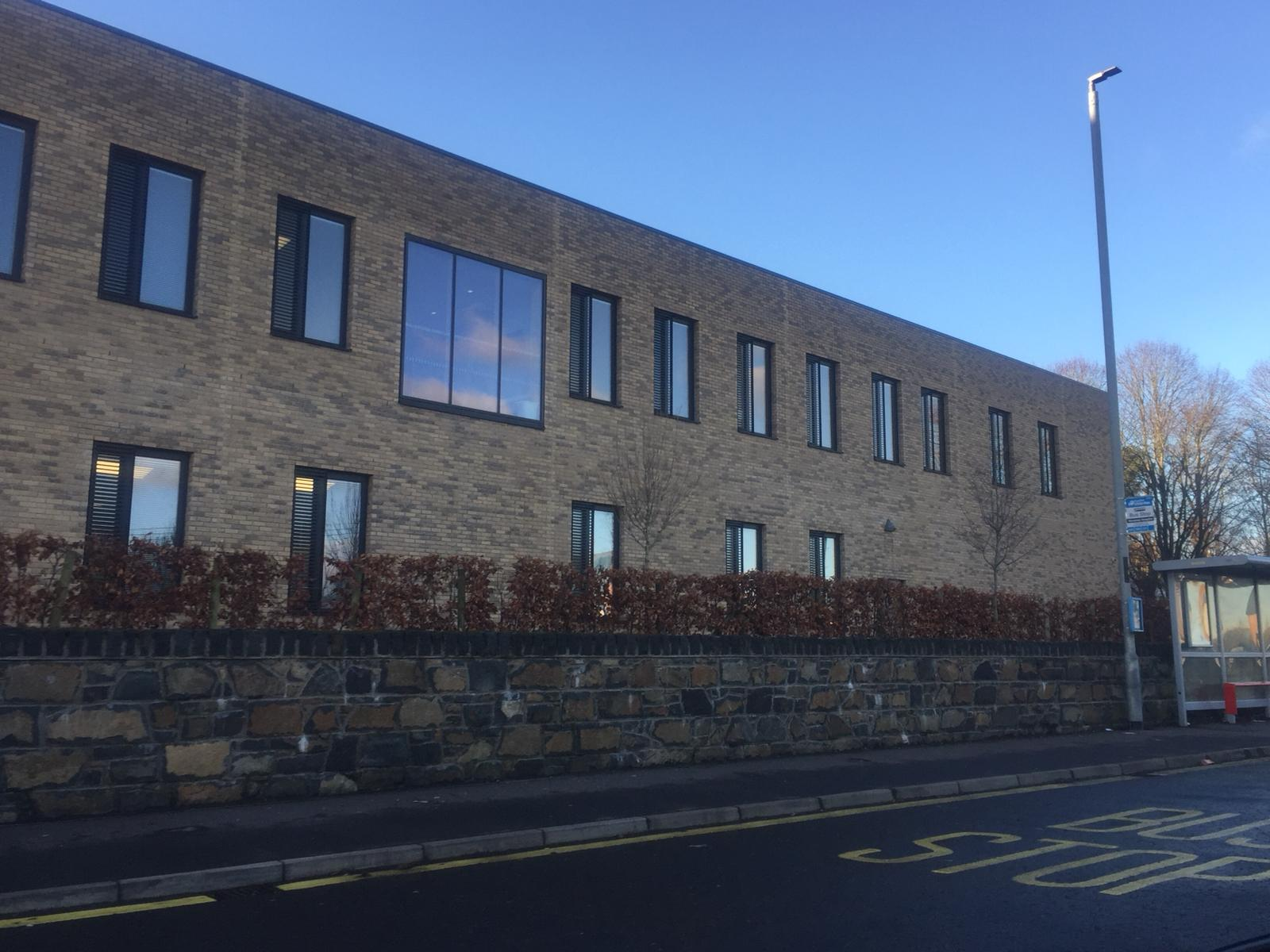
- The new Ballymena Health and Care Centre at the Braid Valley Care Complex

- Shown in Northern Ireland

Geography
- Location: Ballymena, County Antrim, Northern Ireland, United Kingdom
- Coordinates: 54°52′30″N 6°16′21″W

Organisation
- Care system: Health and Social Care in Northern Ireland
- Type: Community

History
- Founded: 1843

Links
- Lists: Hospitals in Northern Ireland

The Braid Valley Care Complex is a community hospital and care centre, situated on the Cushendall road in Ballymena in Northern Ireland. It provides services to the people of Ballymena and County Antrim and is managed by the Northern Health and Social Care Trust.

== History ==
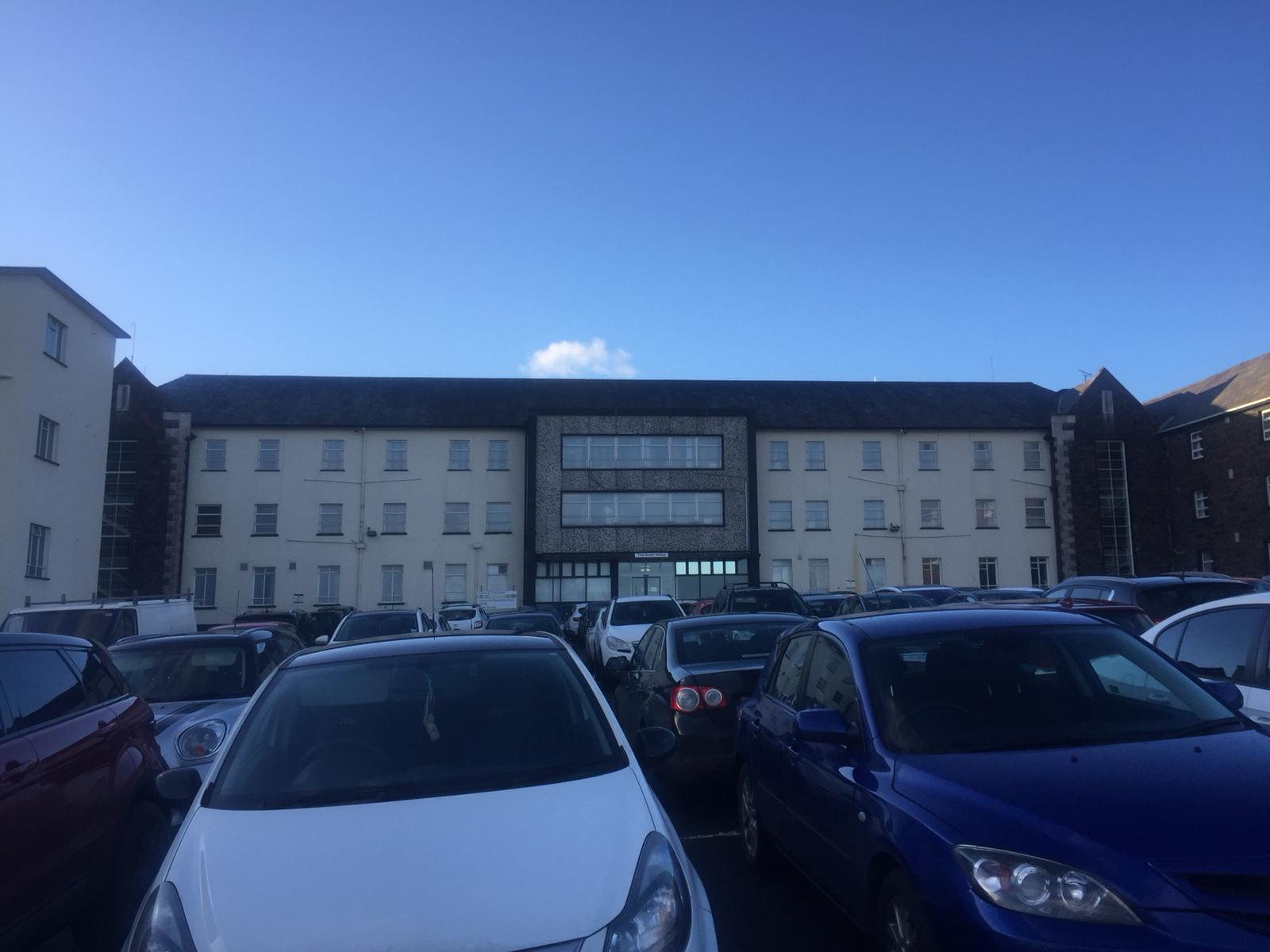
The original Braid Valley building

The hospital has its origins in the Ballymena Union Workhouse and Infirmary which was designed by George Wilkinson and completed in 1843. The building cost £7,800, including furnishing of the interior of the building. On 3 November 1843, the building was officially declared suitable for opening. Following this, two weeks later on 17 November, the first inmates were admitted to the workhouse. The entrance block was subsequently demolished but the main building and the fever building survived and evolved to become the Braid Valley Hospital.

A business case for a new Ballymena Health and Care Centre on the Braid Valley Hospital Site was approved by the Department of Health in March 2012. The building, which was designed by a combination of Glaswegian practices Keppie Design and Hoskins Architects, was built by O'Hare and McGovern, who are based in Newry in Northern Ireland, at a cost of £25 million. Covering an area of approximately 9,000m^{2}, it is the largest of its kind in Northern Ireland. The Health Minister, Simon Hamilton officially opened the new facility in 2016.
