= Holywell Hospital =

- Northern Health and Social Care Trust
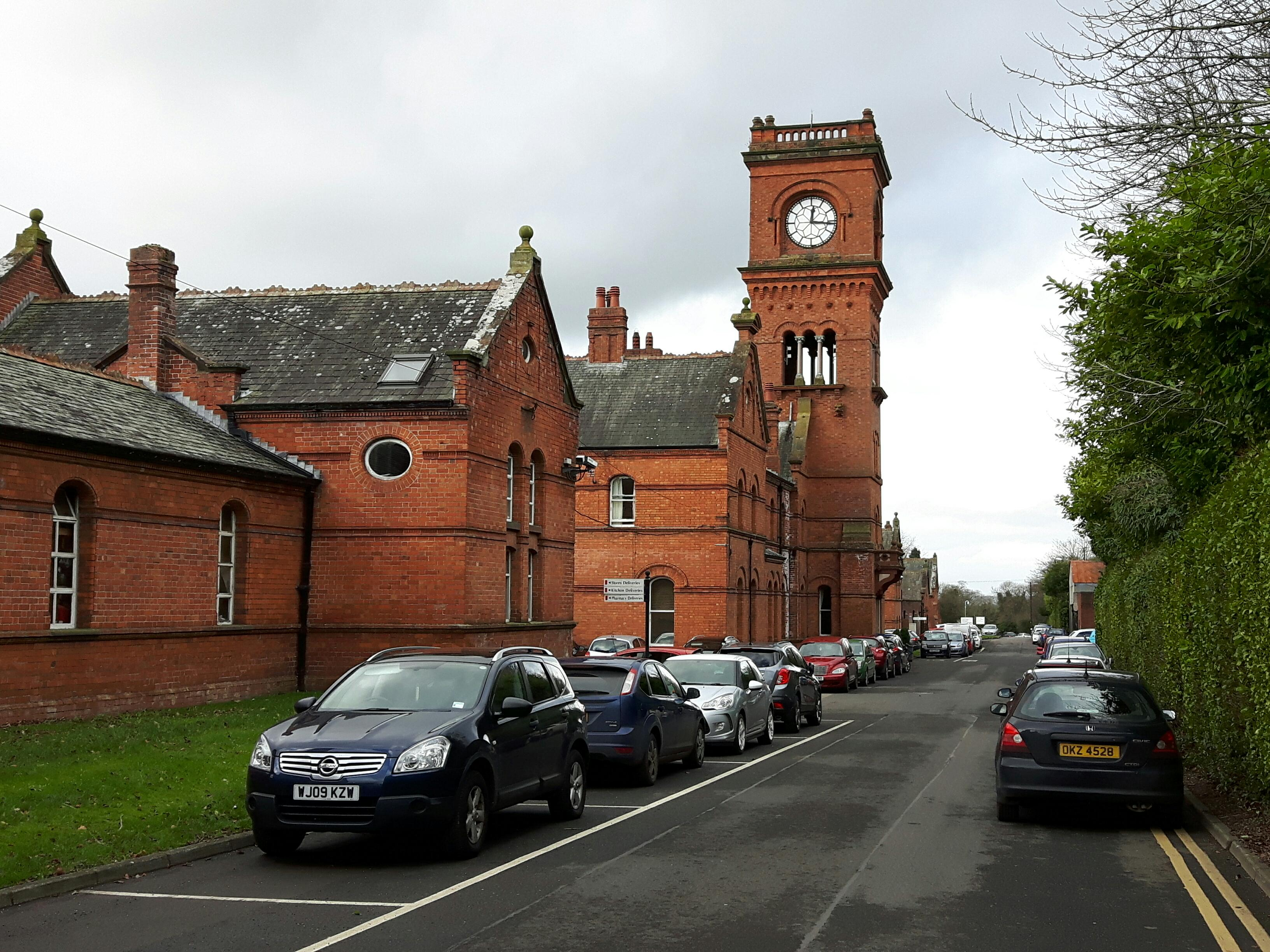

- Shown in Northern Ireland

Geography
- Location: Steeple Road, Antrim, County Antrim, Northern Ireland, United Kingdom
- Coordinates: 54°44′01″N 6°12′33″W

Organisation
- Care system: Health and Social Care in Northern Ireland
- Type: Psychiatric hospital

History
- Founded: 1899

Links
- Website: www.northerntrust.hscni.net/hospitals/306.htm
- Lists: Hospitals in the United Kingdom

Holywell Hospital is a 149-bed mental health facility on a 140-acre site in Antrim, operated by the Northern Health and Social Care Trust.

== History ==
Holywell Hospital was first opened with over 400 beds available for mental health in 1899. Initially called the County Antrim Lunatic Asylum, the need was based on the massive pressures already existing at the time in Belfast’s former mental hospital which was then based on the site of the current Royal Maternity Hospital on the Grosvenor Road.

The site was originally selected in 1891 and construction later began in around 1894 under the direction of architect John Lanyon, the son of Charles Lanyon, and builders H & J Martin of Belfast. It was set to be open by 1896 but due to contractual difficulties completion delayed until 1899. In 1900, all County Antrim patients were transferred from Belfast to Holywell and it began to accept its first direct admissions.

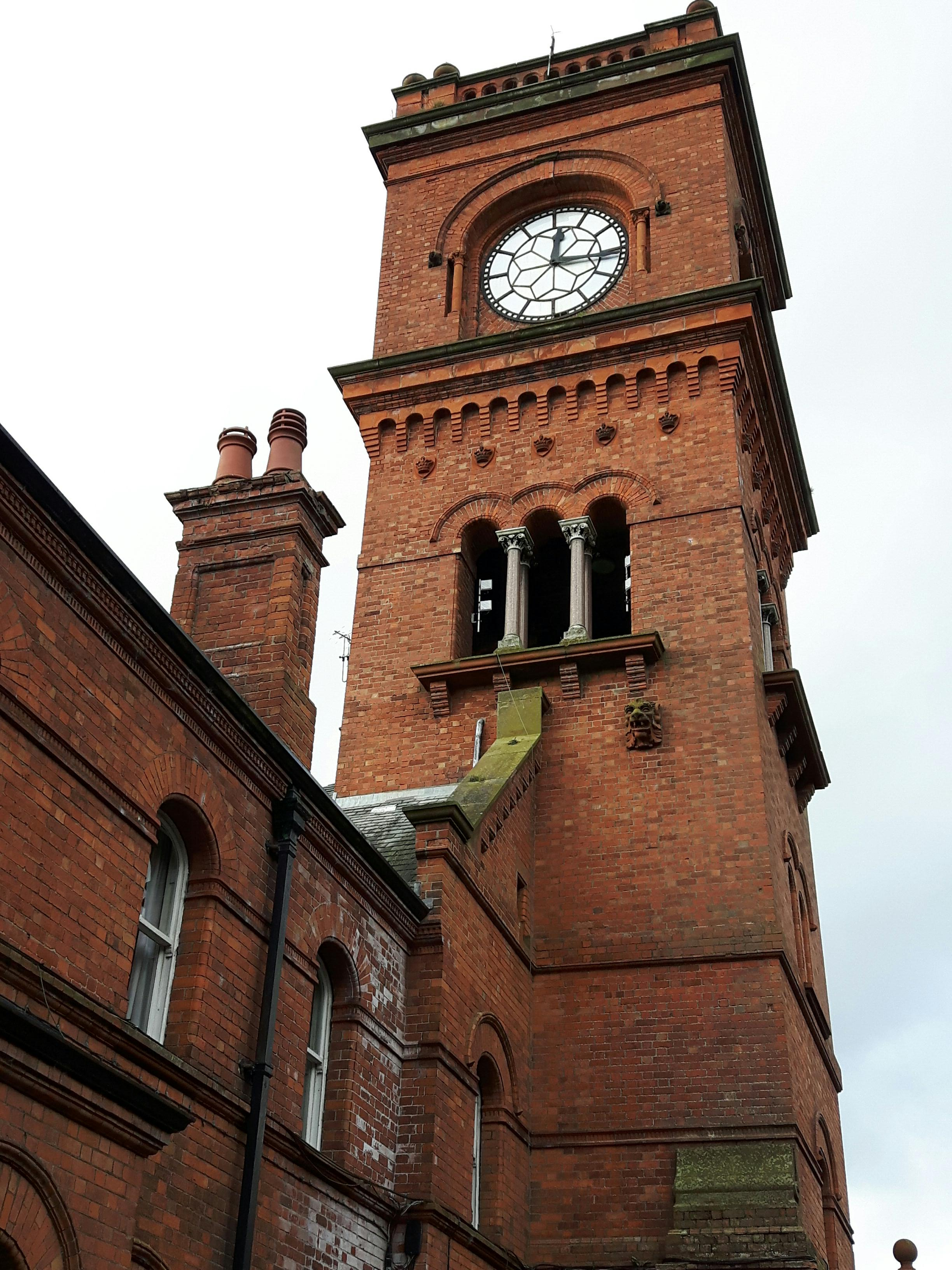
The clock tower at Holywell Hospital.

The hospital features a clock tower, construction of which was overseen by Lanyon and which, when illuminated at night, was used by boats to navigate the mouth of the nearby Six Mile Water river.

The very original layout of the hospital as first built in the late 1800s included admin and ward complexes, detached Roman Catholic and Protestant Churches, a mortuary, and a separate residence for the Medical Superintendent of the hospital. In the 1930s after a fire destroyed parts of the building, multiple refurbishments were carried out including the dining hall, kitchen and laundry buildings being rebuilt but also the addition of conventional heating via radiators throughout the complex. Towards the end of the 1930s extensions to the male and females sides of the hospital were completed.

In 1948, the NHS took over the running of the facility however patient numbers in Holywell Hospital grew and grew until the end of 1950s where it is thought there were over 800 inpatients in a hospital that was originally designed to house 400. In 1958 it was documented that there were 827 inpatients present in the facility.

The hospital was a huge source of employment for the local area on the estate farm, in the laundry and in the kitchens and as a result became integrated into the local community. Community dances and social events were often held in Holywell, attended by multiple locals and staff every month. Records indicate that Holywell hosted a dance at the end of every month with well over 500 members of the public in attendance, entertained by the various popular showbands of the era. At the time, it even boasted its own beauty salon and branch of the Women's Institute.

Following the introduction of Care in the Community in the early 1980s the hospital went into a period of decline and concerns have been raised by local politicians about the state of the aging facilities.

== The Speedwell Magazine ==
The Speedwell Magazine was first published in 1959 and continued to be published every three months up until the end of 1973. It was the brainchild of the Resident Medical Superintendent at the time, Dr G.M Smith and its purpose was to create a ‘therapeutic community’ within Holywell. Each quarterly edition of the magazine included sections about hospital activities, information of health and beauty, sports, competitions, outings and holidays. It differed from many other hospital magazines at the time as both staff but also patients could submit material for the consideration of the publishing committee made up of exclusively staff members. During the 1950s, antipsychotic drugs were introduced which made care in the community a real possibility. It was a time of changing attitudes towards mental health and patients with mental health. The Speedwell magazine, for patients, was a method of talking about their lives, including their treatment for mental ill health and how it didn't define them through the medium of literature and poems.

== Services ==
Facilities include:

- The Tobernaveen Centre which is a 14-bed acute admission ward within Holywell Hospital that provides mental health care and treatment to elderly patients.
- The Rehabilitation and Addiction Unit which aims to tackle alcohol and drug abuse in male and female adult patients. Services provided include alcohol detox assistance, opiate abuse substitute therapy and stabilisation treatment.
- The Intensive Care Unit which treats, among others, patients detained in accordance with the Mental Health (Northern Ireland) Order 1986.
