= List of acts of the Northern Ireland Assembly from 2009 =

This is a list of acts of the Northern Ireland Assembly passed in 2009. Acts of the Northern Ireland Assembly are enacted by the Northern Ireland Assembly, which has legislative authority over devolved matters in relation to Northern Ireland under the authority of the Northern Ireland Act 1998. Acts are cited by calendar year, in the same fashion as acts of Parliament of the United Kingdom. Each act passed in a respective year is given a chapter number (abbreviated "c.") denoted by Arabic numerals, and citations are usually followed by the suffix "(N.I.)" so as to prevent confusion with acts of Parliament of the United Kingdom.

9 acts of the Northern Ireland Assembly were passed in 2009.

indicates that an act has been transcribed on Wikisource, indicates that an act is available to view at legislation.gov.uk, and indicates the location of the original act in the Parliamentary Archives.

== Acts of the Northern Ireland Assembly ==
Short title	Citation	Royal assent
Long title
Health and Social Care (Reform) Act (Northern Ireland) 2009	2009 c. 1 (N.I.)	21 January 2009
An Act to make changes to the administrative structures for health and social care; and for connected purposes.
Financial Assistance Act (Northern Ireland) 2009	2009 c. 2 (N.I.)	4 February 2009
An Act to enable the making by Northern Ireland departments of schemes for financial assistance in certain circumstances.
Public Authorities (Reform) Act (Northern Ireland) 2009	2009 c. 3 (N.I.)	16 February 2009
An Act to make provision for, or in connection with, the abolition of certain public authorities.
Building Regulations (Amendment) Act (Northern Ireland) 2009	2009 c. 4 (N.I.)	2 March 2009
An Act to amend the Building Regulations (Northern Ireland) Order 1979. (Note: Building Regulations (Northern Ireland) Order 1979 (SI 1979/1709))
Budget Act (Northern Ireland) 2009 (repealed)	2009 c. 5 (N.I.)	6 March 2009
An Act to authorise the issue out of the Consolidated Fund of certain sums for the service of the years ending 31st March 2009 and 2010; to appropriate those sums for specified purposes; to authorise the Department of Finance and Personnel to borrow on the credit of the appropriated sums; to authorise the use for the public service of certain resources for the years ending 31st March 2009 and 2010; and to revise the limits on the use of certain accruing resources in the year ending 31st March 2009. (Repealed by Budget (No. 2) Act (Northern Ireland) 2012 (c. 4 (N.I.)))
Presumption of Death Act (Northern Ireland) 2009	2009 c. 6 (N.I.)	2 July 2009
An Act to make provision in relation to the presumed deaths of missing persons; and for connected purposes.
Budget (No. 2) Act (Northern Ireland) 2009 (repealed)	2009 c. 7 (N.I.)	8 July 2009
An Act to authorise the issue out of the Consolidated Fund of certain sums for the service of the year ending 31st March 2010; to appropriate those sums for specified purposes; to authorise the Department of Finance and Personnel to borrow on the credit of the appropriated sums; to authorise the use for the public service of certain resources (including accruing resources) for the year ending 31st March 2010; and to repeal certain spent provisions. (Repealed by Budget (No. 2) Act (Northern Ireland) 2012 (c. 4 (N.I.)))
Rates (Amendment) Act (Northern Ireland) 2009	2009 c. 8 (N.I.)	3 November 2009
An Act to amend the Rates (Northern Ireland) Order 1977; (Note: Rates (Northern Ireland) Order 1977 (SI 1977/2157)) to make provision relating to the sharing of certain social security information with the Department of Finance and Personnel and others; and to confer a temporary power to make grants to district councils.
Financial Provisions Act (Northern Ireland) 2009	2009 c. 9 (N.I.)	15 December 2009
An Act to confer absolute privilege on certain reports of the Comptroller and Auditor General for Northern Ireland; to enable the Department of Enterprise, Trade and Investment to incur expenditure for certain purposes; to enable the Office of the First Minister and deputy First Minister to incur expenditure for certain purposes; and to repeal the requirement on the Department of Finance and Personnel to prepare Finance Accounts.
