= Roe Valley Hospital =

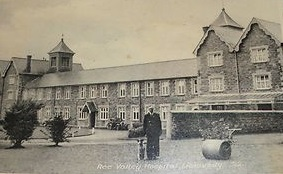
- Roe Valley Hospital

- Location in Northern Ireland

Geography
- Location: Benevenagh Drive, Limavady, Northern Ireland
- Coordinates: 55.0480°N 6.9410°W

Organisation
- Care system: Health and Social Care in Northern Ireland
- Type: Community

History
- Founded: 1842
- Closed: 1997

Roe Valley Hospital is a health facility in Benevenagh Drive, Limavady, Northern Ireland, managed by the Western Health and Social Care Trust. It currently offers local health services, such as diabetes services, occupational therapy and urology services.

== History ==
The facility has its origins in the Newtown Limavady Union Workhouse which was designed by George Wilkinson and was completed in March 1842. It became the Limavady District Hospital in 1932 and, after joining the National Health Service in 1948, the facility evolved to become Roe Valley Hospital. After services transferred to Altnagelvin Area Hospital, Roe Valley Hospital closed in 1997. The buildings were subsequently restored by the Limavady Community Development Initiative, a local charity, allowing visitors to see the original gatehouse and one of the dormitories as well as access some of the salvaged archive. In 2011 the facility was used as the venue for a play by a local theatre company and it continues to be used for local health services such as diabetes clinics.

== Services ==
Roe Valley Hospital currently offers local health services, such as diabetes services, occupational therapy and urology services. Limavady Ambulance Station is located on the hospital grounds, and Limavady Health Centre is located beside the hospital. Additionally to the diabetes services, Roe Valley Hospital hosts support groups such as the Limavady Diabetes Support Group, with one of the volunteers being nominated for the Supporting Others Award at the national Inspire Awards by Diabetes UK.
