= Armagh Community Hospital =

- Southern Health and Social Care Trust
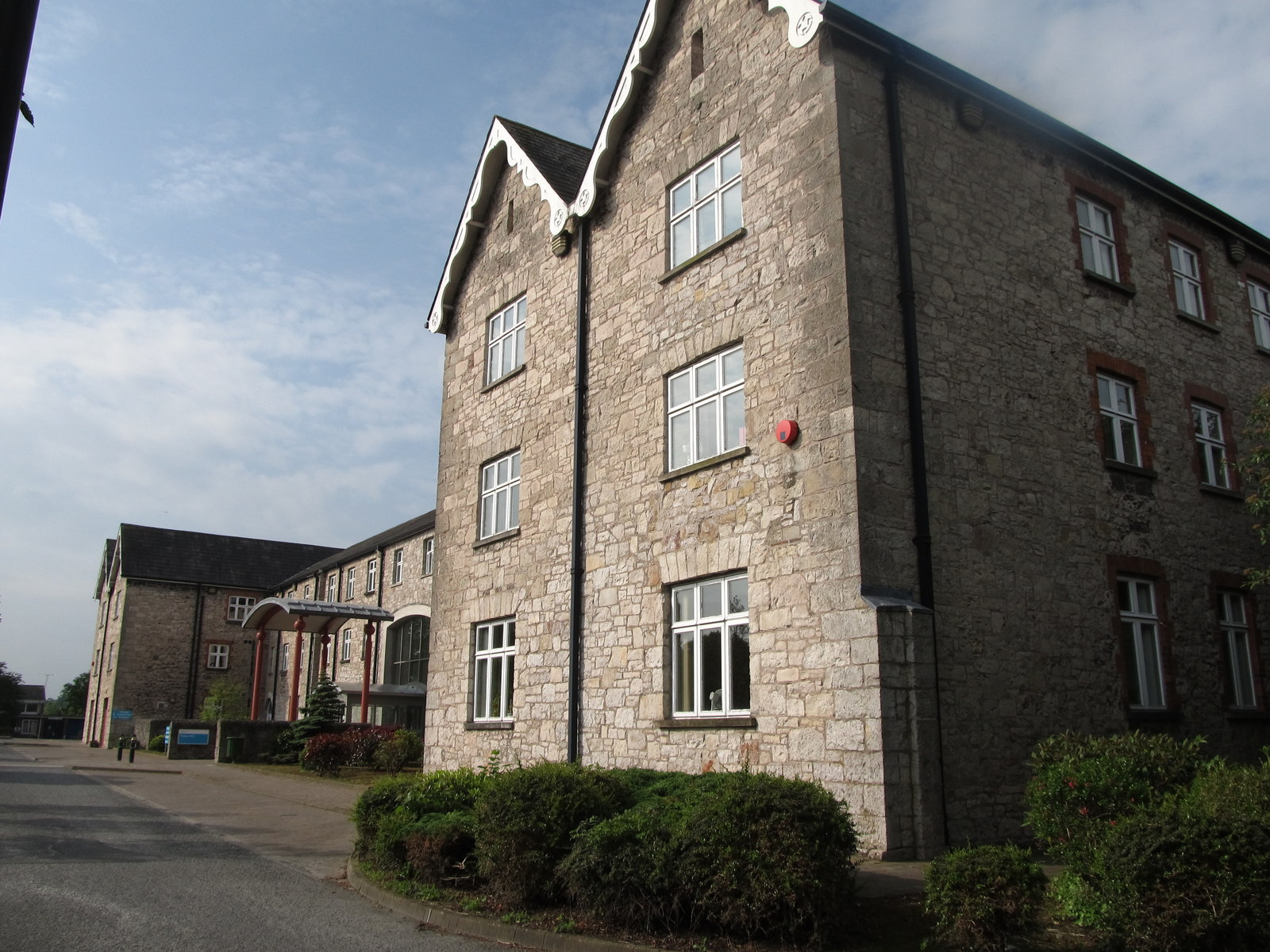
- Armagh Community Hospital

- Location in Northern Ireland

Geography
- Location: Tower Hill, Armagh, Northern Ireland
- Coordinates: 54.3508°N 6.6431°W

Organisation
- Care system: Health and Social Care in Northern Ireland
- Type: Community

History
- Founded: 1841

The Armagh Community Hospital is a health facility at Tower Hill, Armagh, Northern Ireland. It is managed by the Southern Health and Social Care Trust. The Armagh Workhouse that it is based within was once the largest such facility in Ulster.

== History ==
The facility has its origins in the Armagh Union Workhouse which was designed by George Wilkinson and was completed in December 1841. After joining the National Health Service as Tower Hill Hospital in 1948, it evolved to become Armagh Community Hospital. The old workhouse infirmary, known as Riverside House, which became the headquarters of the headquarters of the local health and social services board in the 1990s, was marketed for sale in May 2016.

During the 2010s, a number of medical departments were closed or withdrawn from Armagh Community Hospital. In 2014, the minor injuries unit was closed temporarily due to the hospital regularly breaching Accident & Emergency time targets set by the Northern Ireland Health and Social Care Board. In 2016, the ophthalmology unit was closed due to shortage of staff and the ear, nose and throat department was closed due to a consultant's retirement. In 2018, following a closure of audiology units and a leaked memo claiming that ophthalmology would not return to the hospital, the Newry and Armagh Social Democratic and Labour Party MLA Justin McNulty accused the hospital's board of engaging in "downgrading by stealth". This was due to the removals of outpatient units and continued closure of the minor injuries unit.
