= Moyle Hospital =

- Northern Health and Social Care Trust
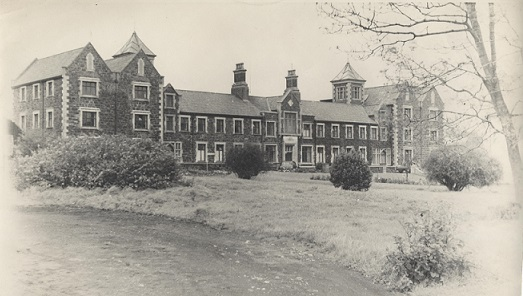
- Moyle Hospital

- Location in Northern Ireland

Geography
- Location: Gloucester Avenue, Larne, Northern Ireland
- Coordinates: 54.8546°N 5.8174°W

Organisation
- Care system: Health and Social Care in Northern Ireland
- Type: General

History
- Founded: 1842

The Moyle Hospital is a health facility in Gloucester Avenue, Larne, Northern Ireland. It is managed by the Northern Health and Social Care Trust.

== History ==
The facility has its origins in the Larne Union Workhouse which was designed by George Wilkinson and was completed in October 1842. It became Larne District Hospital in 1929 and, after joining the National Health Service in 1948, became known as Moyle Hospital. X-Ray services were suspended at the hospital in January 2017.
