= Harriett Cassells =

Irish nurse (1926–2017)

- Born: 1926; County Donegal, Ireland
- Died: 24 November 2017 (aged 90–91); Belfast, Northern Ireland
- Occupation: Nurse
- Employer: Belvoir Park Hospital
- Organization: Royal College of Nursing

Harriett Cassells SRN FRCN (née Thompson; 1926 – 24 November 2017) was a nurse from Northern Ireland recognised for her contributions to fever nursing and infection control.

== Early life and education ==
Cassells was born in 1926 near Lifford in County Donegal, Ireland. Her father was gassed in World War I and in about 1940 developed a respiratory illness. Cassells helped to look after him and stated later in interview this made her this made her think about nursing.

== Nursing career ==
Cassells began her nursing career on 19 October 1943 at the Purdysburn Fever Hospital Belfast, where she qualified as a registered Fever Nurse in 1946. She then transferred to Belfast City Hospital and completed her General Training, qualifying as a State Registered Nurse in 1949. After qualifying, she worked for nearly a year in the operating theatre department of Belfast City Hospital.

In 1950, she returned to Purdysburn (then The Northern Ireland Fever Hospital) and was appointed a sister on the Meningitis Ward. During this time, Cassells made infection control one of her specialities. In 1951, she introduced new aseptic techniques and modern methods of sterilisation. She was involved in obtaining steam sterilisers and introducing paper towels.

In 1964, after a career break to start a family, Cassells became a nursing sister at the Belvoir Park Hospital. Cassells contributed to improving services for children and parents at ward level. In 1974, she introduced a procedure to allow parents into infectious areas, instructing them more closely in the care of their children. Previous to this, parents had not been allowed direct contact with their children who were being barrier nursed to prevent infection spreading. This situation had resonated with Cassells during her years of training.

== Other clinical and professional contributions ==
Cassells contributed to clinically based research and collaborated with medical teams researching Pertussis in Northern Ireland.

Cassells worked to see the introduction of the clinical nurse specialist and throughout her career maintained an interest in nursing education at patient level.

She regularly worked in curriculum planning for post-registration courses in infectious diseases. She lectured at Queen's University Belfast on the subject of infectious disease control and maintained an active teaching presence within her own hospital for student nurses and other staff.

She was Chair of the RCN Belfast Branch of the Royal College of Nursing (RCN) in 1976.

She is mentioned as a Deputy RCN Steward Northern Ireland on the Stewards Newsletter of 1982.

== Personal life ==
She was married to Joe Cassells in 1951 and was mother of Andrew, John and Joseph. Cassells died on 24 November 2017 at the Royal Victoria Hospital in Belfast after a short illness.

== Honours ==
In 1985 Harriett Cassells was awarded fellowship of the Royal College of Nursing. The Fellowship was granted to her when a ward sister at Belvoir Park Hospital, Belfast. She is acknowledged as having made a significant contribution to the development of infection control and services for parents and children at ward level. In 2009, she was selected to be interviewed for an oral history for the Royal College of Nursing archives.
