= Belvoir Park Hospital =

- Belfast City Hospital Trust
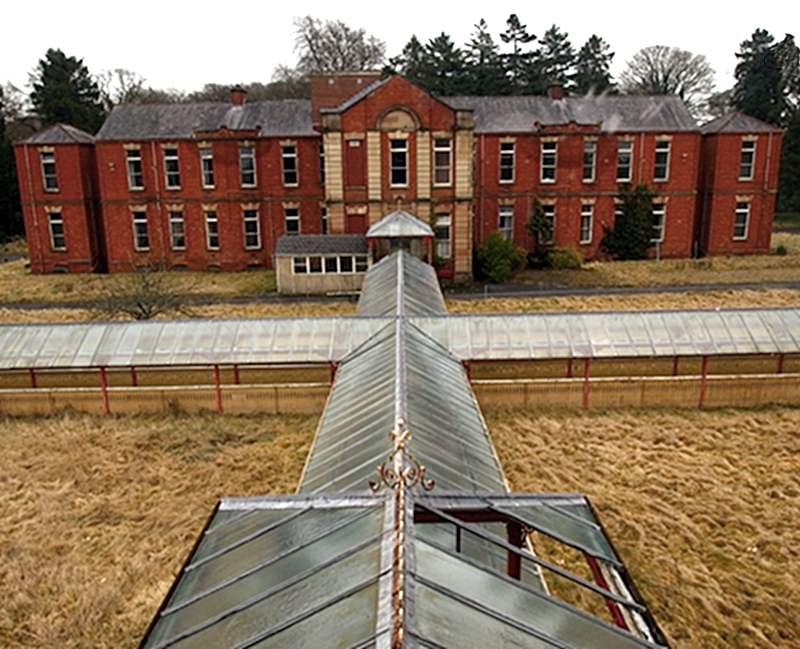
- Belvoir Park Hospital in 2010

- Location in Northern Ireland

Geography
- Location: Newtownbreda, Belfast, Northern Ireland, United Kingdom
- Coordinates: 54.54409°N 5.93223°W

Organisation
- Care system: Health and Social Care in Northern Ireland
- Type: Specialised

Services
- Emergency department: No Accident & Emergency

History
- Founded: 1906
- Closed: March 2006

Links
- Lists: Hospitals in Northern Ireland

Belvoir Park Hospital was a cancer treatment specialist hospital situated in Newtownbreda, South Belfast, Northern Ireland. Belvoir Park held Northern Ireland's only radiotherapy unit, until the opening of a new cancer treatment centre in Belfast City Hospital.

== History ==
The hospital, which was designed by Young and McKenzie, opened as the Purdysburn Fever Hospital in 1906. The facility became known as Montgomery House in 1953 and it then became Belvoir Park Hospital in the 1960s.

The hospital became the main regional centre for oncology, offering radiotherapy and chemotherapy treatments and in 1983, the hospital was the first in the province to take delivery of a CT scanner. Friends of Montgomery House, a charity founded by Dr Gerard Lynch to help cancer sufferers and their families, was established in 1984 and the hospital's Gerard Lynch Centre held many cancer support groups, in order to aid both sufferers and their families.

After services had been transferred to Belfast City Hospital, the hospital closed in March 2006. In June 2014 the site was sold to a private developer known as the Neptune Group. Neptune Group have since restored some of the original buildings to function as modern townhouses, and the first showhomes were opened in June 2017.

== See also ==
- Cancer treatment

== Notable staff ==
Harriett Cassells 1943–2017 was a sister at Belvoir Park Hospital commencing the role in 1964. Among other clinical contributions in 1974 she led an initiative to allow parents to remain with children who were being barrier nursed when suffering from infectious diseases. Cassells an active member of the RCN (Royal College of Nursing) and was Chair of the Belfast Branch of the RCN in 1976. She was made a Fellow of the RCN in 1985.
