= Robinson Hospital =

- Northern Health and Social Care Trust
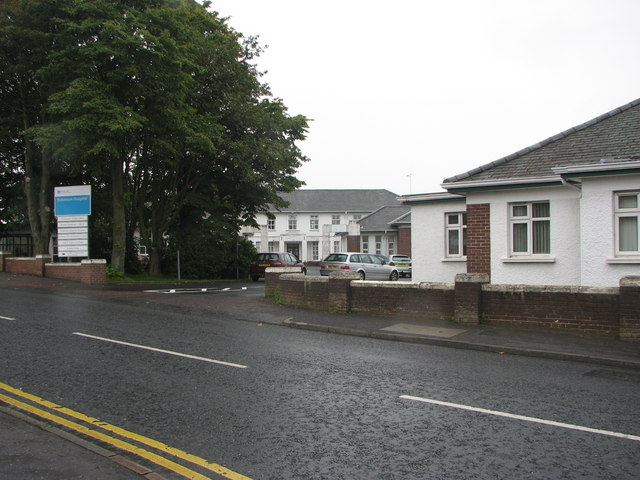
- Robinson Hospital

- Location in Northern Ireland

Geography
- Location: Newal Road, Ballymoney, Northern Ireland
- Coordinates: 55.0721°N 6.5060°W

Organisation
- Care system: Health and Social Care in Northern Ireland
- Type: General

History
- Founded: 1933

The Robinson Hospital is a health facility in Newal Road, Ballymoney, Northern Ireland. It is managed by the Northern Health and Social Care Trust.

== History ==
The facility was financed by a gift from Samuel Robinson of Philadelphia, a founder of American Stores, in memory of his parents who came from Cloughmills. It was designed by Thomas Houston and was officially opened by the Duchess of Abercorn in September 1933. It joined the National Health Service in 1948. A new health centre adjacent to the hospital was opened by Lord Grey in May 1970 and an old x-ray department was converted into a hydrotherapy pool in 1975.
