= Downe Hospital =

- South Eastern Health and Social Care Trust
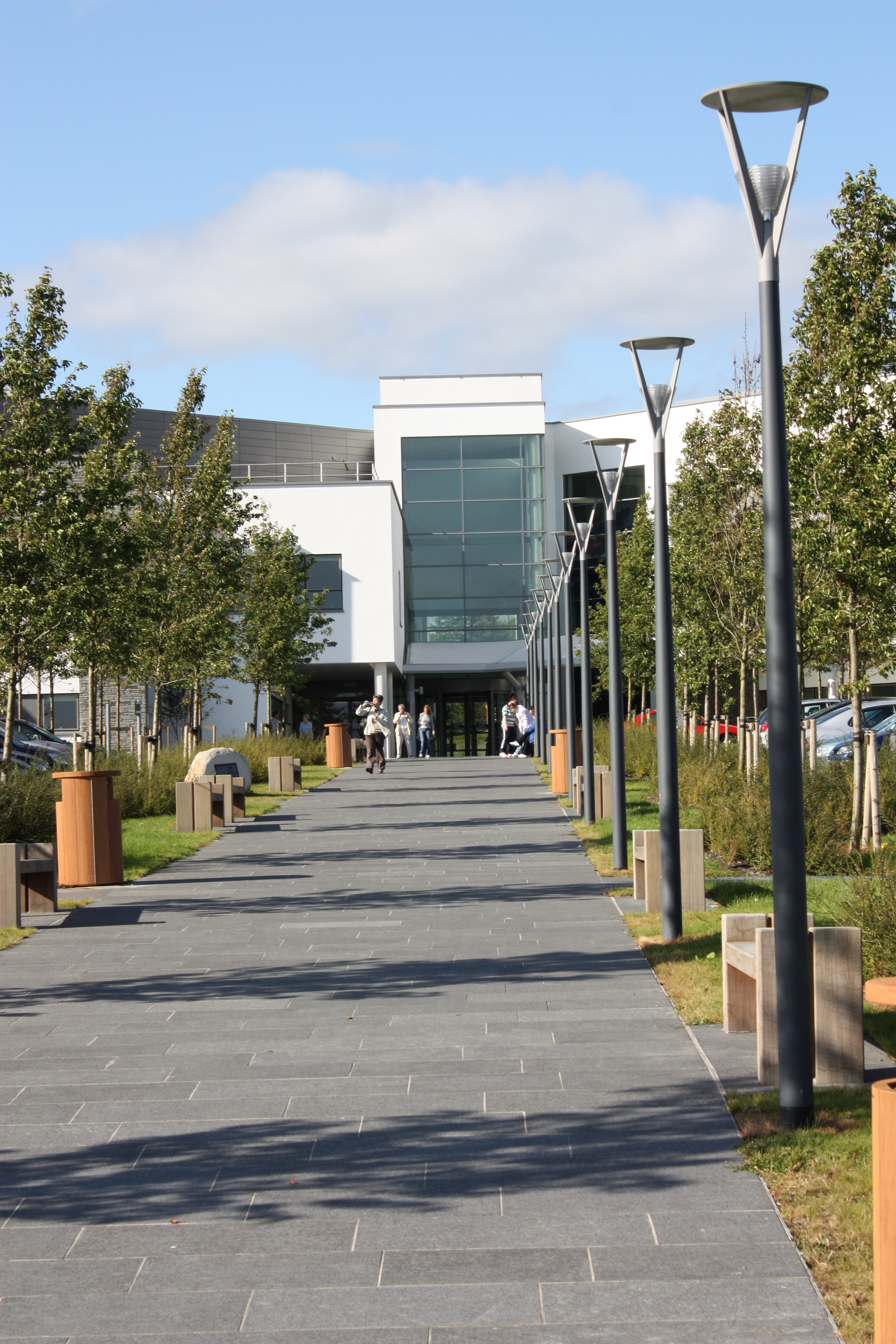
- Entrance to Downe Hospital

- Location in Northern Ireland

Geography
- Location: Downpatrick, County Down, Northern Ireland, United Kingdom
- Coordinates: 54.3208°N 5.6930°W

Organisation
- Care system: Health and Social Care in Northern Ireland
- Type: District General

Services
- Emergency department: No (Temporarily closed 2020)

History
- Founded: 1767

Links
- Website: Official website

Downe Hospital is a local hospital in Downpatrick, County Down, Northern Ireland. It is managed by the South Eastern Health and Social Care Trust.

== History ==
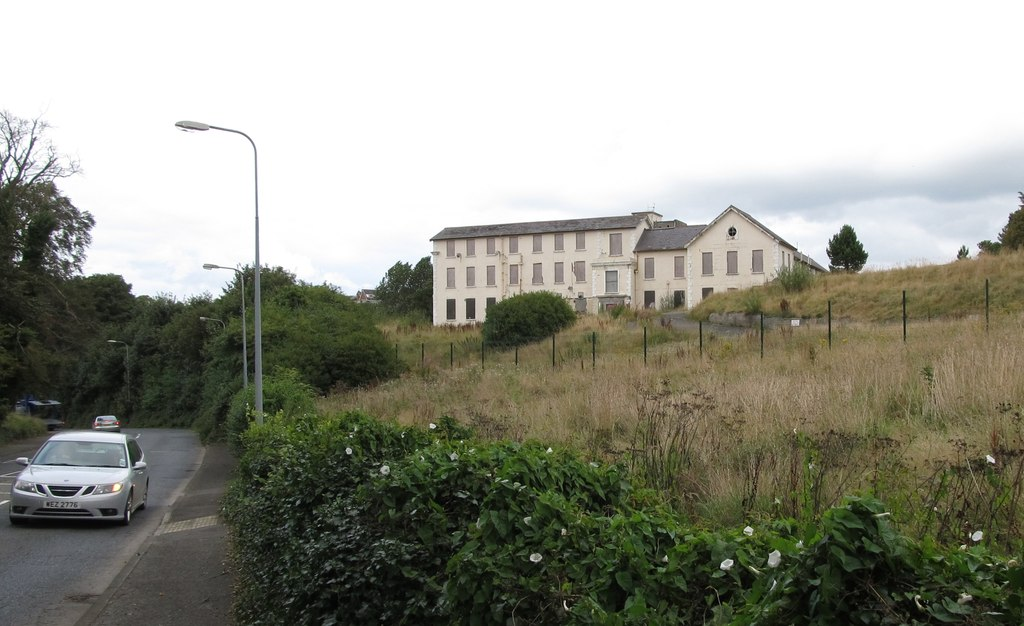
The derelict old Downe Hospital at Pound Lane

The hospital has its origins in the Down County Infirmary which opened in Saul Street in October 1767. It moved to the site of the old horse barracks in Barrack Lane, now Fountain Street, in 1774.

A new infirmary was established at Pound Lane in 1834 but by the late 1970s it was already becoming apparent that it was incapable of further expansion.

A modern hospital, which was designed by Scott Wilson Group and built on Ardglass Road at a cost of £64 million, opened in June 2009.

After services transferred to the new hospital, the old infirmary on Pound Lane closed and was acquired by a developer in November 2014.

The redevelopment of the former hospital site at Pound Lane began in May 2018. The development includes a range of new social houses in the form of apartments, two and three storey homes and bungalows.

The Infirmary Building which fronts Pound Lane is a Grade B2 listed building and had received various small additions over the years. Most of these were stripped back after its closure to reveal the original Victorian Hospital. The Fever Hospital at the rear is also Grade B2 listed. Both buildings have been incorporated into the development plan as apartment blocks and work began on their restoration in April 2021.

The Downe's emergency department was temporarily closed on 30 March 2020 due to a lack of funding. A consultant led urgent care center opened in its place, offering non-life threatening treatment for unscheduled medical care.
