= Lurgan Hospital =

- Southern Health and Social Care Trust
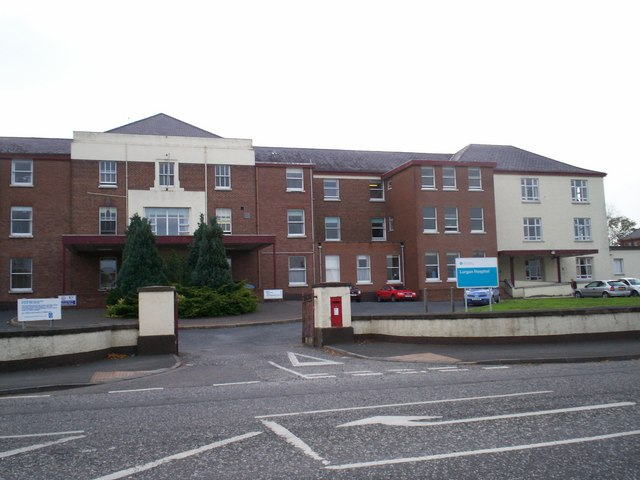
- Lurgan Hospital

- Location in Northern Ireland

Geography
- Location: Sloan Street, Lurgan, Northern Ireland
- Coordinates: 54.4565°N 6.3389°W

Organisation
- Care system: Health and Social Care in Northern Ireland
- Type: Community

History
- Founded: 1841

The Lurgan Hospital is a health facility in Sloan Street, Lurgan, Northern Ireland. It is managed by the Southern Health and Social Care Trust.

== History ==
The facility has its origins in the Lurgan Union Workhouse which was designed by George Wilkinson and was completed in January 1841. It became the Lurgan and Portadown District Hospital in 1929 and, after joining the National Health Service in 1948, evolved to become Lurgan Hospital. Nurse training, which had been established at Lurgan during the Second World War transferred to the Craigavon Area Hospital in 1970. In June 2014 the trust began a consultation on the transfer of stroke inpatient services from Lurgan Hospital to Craigavon Area Hospital.
