= Ards Community Hospital =

- South Eastern Health and Social Care Trust
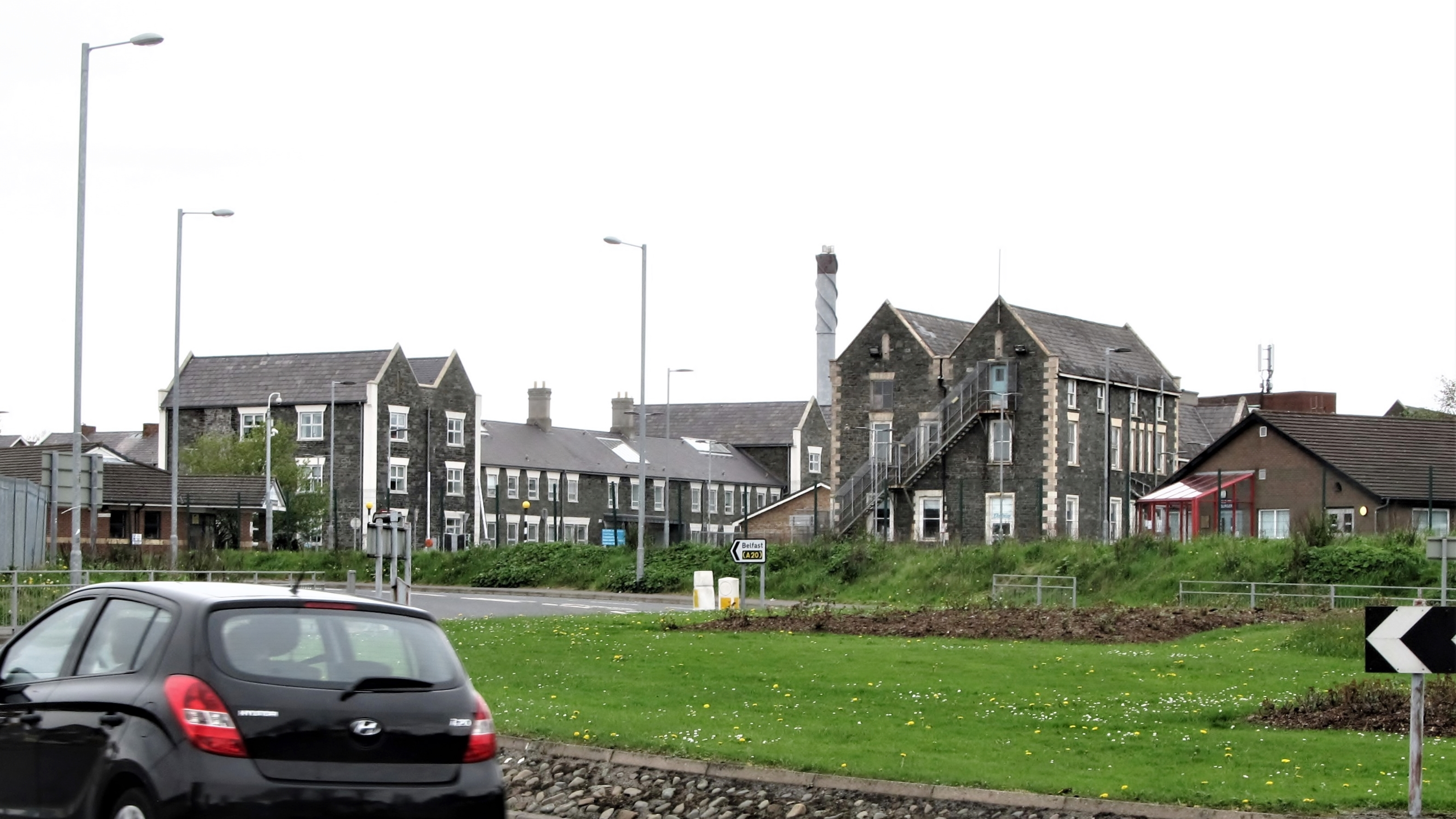
- Ards Community Hospital

- Location in Northern Ireland

Geography
- Location: Church Street, Newtownards, Northern Ireland
- Coordinates: 54.5934°N 5.7056°W

Organisation
- Care system: Health and Social Care in Northern Ireland
- Type: Community

History
- Founded: 1841

The Ards Community Hospital is a health facility in Church Street, Newtownards, Northern Ireland. It is managed by the South Eastern Health and Social Care Trust.

== History ==
The facility has its origins in the Newtownards Union Workhouse which was designed by George Wilkinson and was completed in December 1841. It became the Ards District Hospital in 1932 and, after joining the National Health Service in 1948, evolved to become Ards Community Hospital. In 2016 the gate lodge for the hospital was refurbished to create a social enterprise café. The hospital was used as a location for the filming of Dublin Murders in 2018.
