= W. J. Barre =

Irish architect (1830–1867)

William Joseph Barre
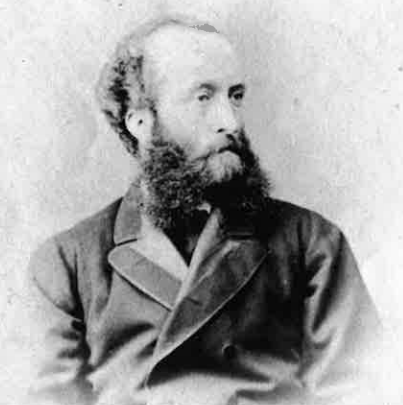
- Born: 1830; Newry, County Down
- Died: 23 September 1867 (aged 36–37); Belfast
- Occupation: architect

William Joseph Barre (1830 – 23 September 1867) was an Irish architect who built many notable buildings in Belfast in a Gothic Revival style, but was largely overshadowed by Charles Lanyon. He designed several of Ulster's most significant and distinctive buildings during the Victorian period, many of which are churches but also include secular buildings.

== Life and education ==
William Joseph Barre was born in Newry, County Down, in 1830. Having worked for a local builder, he was initially articled to Thomas Duff of Newry from 1847 to 1848, and then to Edward Gribbon of Dublin from 1848 to 1850. He established his own practice in 1850 in Newry. He moved to Belfast in 1860.

He was a freemason, being a member of numerous lodges, and was master 3 times of Lodge 23 Newry.

Barre contracted a lung infection in 1865, which led him to travel to France in 1866 seeking a cure. Some sources indicate this developed in tuberculosis. He returned to Belfast in 1867 and began to work, but died in his home in Fisherwick Place on 23 September 1867. Barre was buried in St Patrick's churchyard, Newry. His tombstone, in elaborate Gothic style, was one he had designed for his father, but it now marks his and his mother's graves.

== Career ==
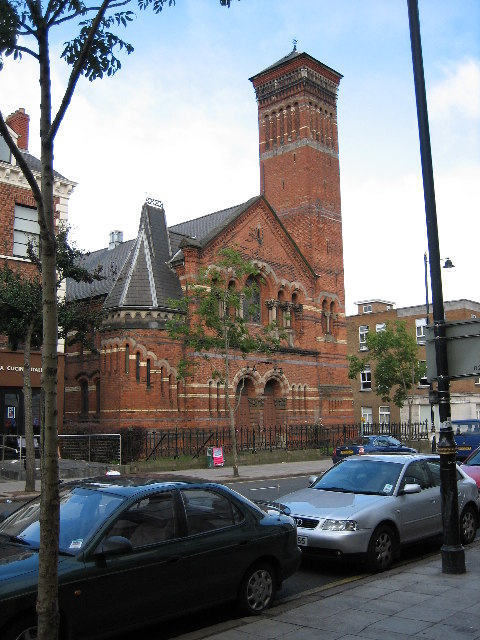
University Road Methodist Church. Built in 1864–65 to the Italianate design of W J Barre, this church is now disused.

His early work in Newry gained him recognition with buildings such as the decorated Gothic-revival style church, Needham Place. Barre used ornament and polychrome brick and sandstone, as shown in his 1865 Lombard Romanesque style Methodist church, University Road, Belfast.

In 1859, he won the competition to design the Ulster Hall, Belfast, against 41 other designs. At the time of its construction, it was the largest music hall in Ireland or Britain. Once he moved to Belfast, Barre designed numerous buildings including mansion, mills, banks, warehouses and schools. He also designed the 1861 memorial to Captain F. R. M. Crozier, with four mourning polar bears supporting the statue of Crozier by Joseph Robinson Kirk.

He did not win the competition in 1856, to design the monument for the 3rd Marquess of Londonderry, which resulted in the building of the Scrabo Tower. Although his design took first place, the decision was overturned based on the costs, the commission ultimately awarded to Charles Lanyon, whose design had come fourth. Lanyon was county surveyor at the time.

In 1865, the selection committee choosing a design for the monument to Prince Albert picked Barre's clock. Later, the General Committee, of which Lanyon was a member, chose to overrule in favour of Lanyon's design. However, public outcry was sufficient to restore the original decision, with Barre's Albert clock tower.

Barre was a council member of the Royal Institute of the Architects of Ireland from 1863 to 1864.

== Works ==
Barre's best known work is the Albert Memorial Clock, in the centre of Belfast, built 1865–1870. He also designed:

- Ulster Hall, Bedford Street, Belfast, 1859–62. Italianate music hall.
- University Road Methodist Church, Belfast, 1864
- Bryson House, Bedford Street, Belfast, 1865–67. Former High Victorian linen warehouse in medieval Italian palazzo style.
- Shaftesbury Square Hospital, Belfast, 1868
- the Provincial Bank of Ireland in Castle Place, Belfast
- Clanwilliam House, now called Danesfort, in Belfast, 1864
- ceiling renovation of St George's Church, Belfast, 1865
- The Moat, Belfast
- remodel of Roxborough Castle in County Tyrone
- Newry Non-subscribing Presbyterian church
- Riverside Presbyterian Church, Newry
- St Anne's Church of Ireland Church (Drumglass), Dungannon
