= Shaftesbury Square Hospital =

- Belfast Health and Social Care Trust
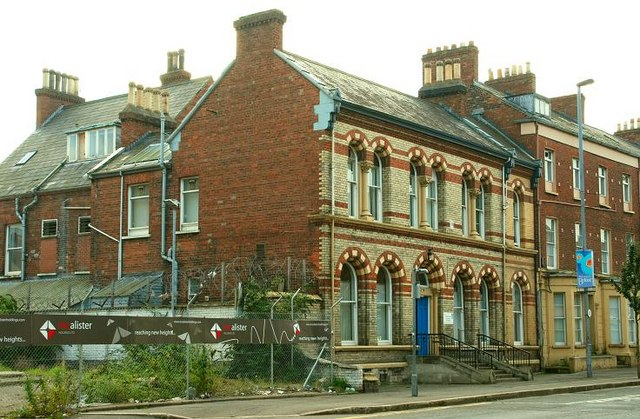
- Shaftesbury Square Hospital

- Location in Northern Ireland

Geography
- Location: Great Victoria Street, Belfast, Northern Ireland
- Coordinates: 54.5911°N 5.9340°W

Organisation
- Care system: Health and Social Care in Northern Ireland
- Type: Specialist

Services
- Speciality: Ophthalmic

History
- Founded: 1868
- Closed: 2010

Shaftesbury Square Hospital was a health facility in Great Victoria Street, Belfast, Northern Ireland. It was managed by the Belfast Health and Social Care Trust.

== History ==
The facility, which was financed by Sir William Johnson and his wife, Lady Johnson, was designed by W. J. Barre and opened as the Shaftesbury Square Ophthalmic Hospital in January 1868. It was extended in 1927 and, after joining the National Health Service in 1948, it became Shaftesbury Square Hospital in 1969. The building was used by the local drug and substance abuse services before it closed in 2010.
