= Southern Health and Social Care Trust =

State body in Northern Ireland

- Type: Health and social care trust
- Headquarters: Craigavon Area Hospital; 68 Lurgan Road; Portadown; Craigavon; BT63 5QQ
- Hospitals: Armagh Community Hospital; Craigavon Area Hospital; Daisy Hill Hospital; Lurgan Hospital; South Tyrone Hospital; St Luke's Hospital
- Staff: 10,754 (2018/19)
- Website: www.southerntrust.hscni.net

The Southern Health and Social Care Trust provides health and social care services in Northern Ireland. It runs Craigavon Area Hospital, Daisy Hill Hospital in Newry, Lurgan Hospital and South Tyrone Hospital as well as Armagh Community Hospital and St Luke's Hospital in Armagh. The trust serves an estimated population of 380,312 (June 2017 estimates).

== History ==
The trust was established on 1 April 2007 when the Health and Social Services Trusts in the five local government districts of Newry & Mourne, Banbridge, Armagh, Craigavon, and Dungannon were dissolved under the Dissolution Orders 2007.

The Trusts in the Southern Health and Social Services Board Area that were abolished were:

- Craigavon Area (Lurgan/Portadown) Hospitals Trust
- Craigavon and Health and Social Services Trust
- Armagh and Dungannon Health and Social Services Trust
- Newry & Mourne Health and Social Services Trust
