= South Eastern Health and Social Care Trust =

State health organisation in Northern Ireland

- Type: Health and social care trust
- Established: 1 April 2007
- Headquarters: Upper Newtownards Road; Dundonald; Belfast; BT16 1RH
- Population: 346,911
- Hospitals: Ards Community Hospital; Bangor Community Hospital; Downe Hospital; Lagan Valley Hospital; Ulster Hospital
- Website: www.setrust.hscni.net

The South Eastern Health and Social Care Trust (SEHSCT) is a health organisation in Northern Ireland. Hospitals served by the Trust include Downe Hospital, Lagan Valley Hospital and Ulster Hospital. It has 14,000 employees and 800 patient beds. It has created a comprehensive electronic record system and uses a fleet of mobile medical carts supplied by Ergotron which are said to have improved the quality of nurses’ daily ward rounds.

== History ==
The trust was established as the South Eastern Health and Social Services Trust on 1 August 2006, and became operational on 1 April 2007. In July 2021, the trust announced the appointment of Roisin Coulter as its next chief executive.

== Performance ==
In April 2022 there were 4,513 children who had been waiting a year or more for a first consultant led outpatient appointment.

== Population ==
The area covered by South Eastern Health and Social Care Trust has a population of 346,911 residents according to the 2011 Northern Ireland census.
