= Bangor Community Hospital =

- South Eastern Health and Social Care Trust
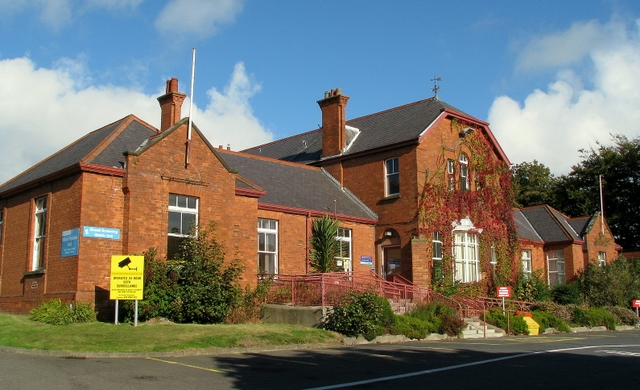
- Bangor Community Hospital

- Location in Northern Ireland

Geography
- Location: Castle Street, Bangor, Northern Ireland
- Coordinates: 54.6587°N 5.6626°W

Organisation
- Care system: Health and Social Care in Northern Ireland
- Type: Community

History
- Founded: 1910

The Bangor Community Hospital is a health facility in Castle Street, Bangor, Northern Ireland. It is managed by the South Eastern Health and Social Care Trust.

== History ==
The facility, which was designed by Young and MacKenzie in the neo-Georgian style, was opened as Bangor Cottage Hospital in 1910. It was extended in 1925 and, after joining the National Health Service in 1948, it evolved to become Bangor Community Hospital. Despite a local campaign to stop the closure, a 20-bed inpatient ward was closed in June 2015.
