= Causeway Hospital =

- Northern Health and Social Care Trust
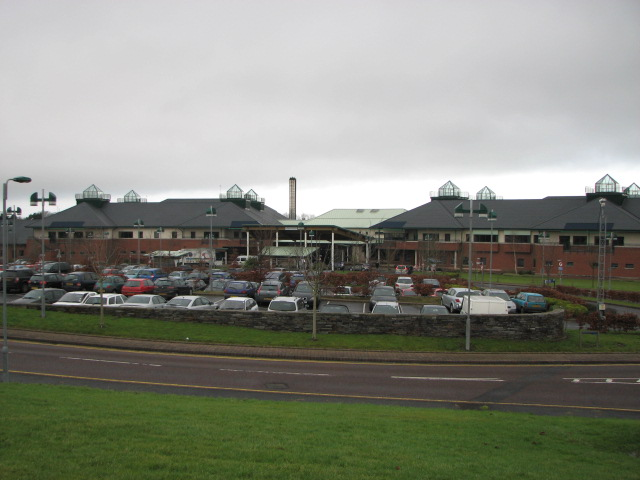
- Causeway Hospital

- Location in Northern Ireland

Geography
- Location: Coleraine, County Londonderry, Northern Ireland
- Coordinates: 55.1233°N 6.6512°W

Organisation
- Care system: Health and Social Care in Northern Ireland
- Type: District General

History
- Founded: 2002

Links
- Website: www.northerntrust.hscni.net/hospitals/209.htm

Causeway Hospital is an acute general hospital in Coleraine, County Londonderry, Northern Ireland. It is managed by the Northern Health and Social Care Trust.

== History ==
The hospital, which replaced Coleraine Hospital and the Route Hospital in Ballymoney, was built at a cost of £55 million. It was officially opened by First Minister David Trimble and Deputy First Minister Mark Durkan in April 2002. In February 2003 it was designated as one of the nine acute hospitals in the acute hospital network of Northern Ireland on which healthcare would be focused under the government health policy 'Developing Better Services'.
