= Daisy Hill Hospital =

- Southern Health and Social Care Trust
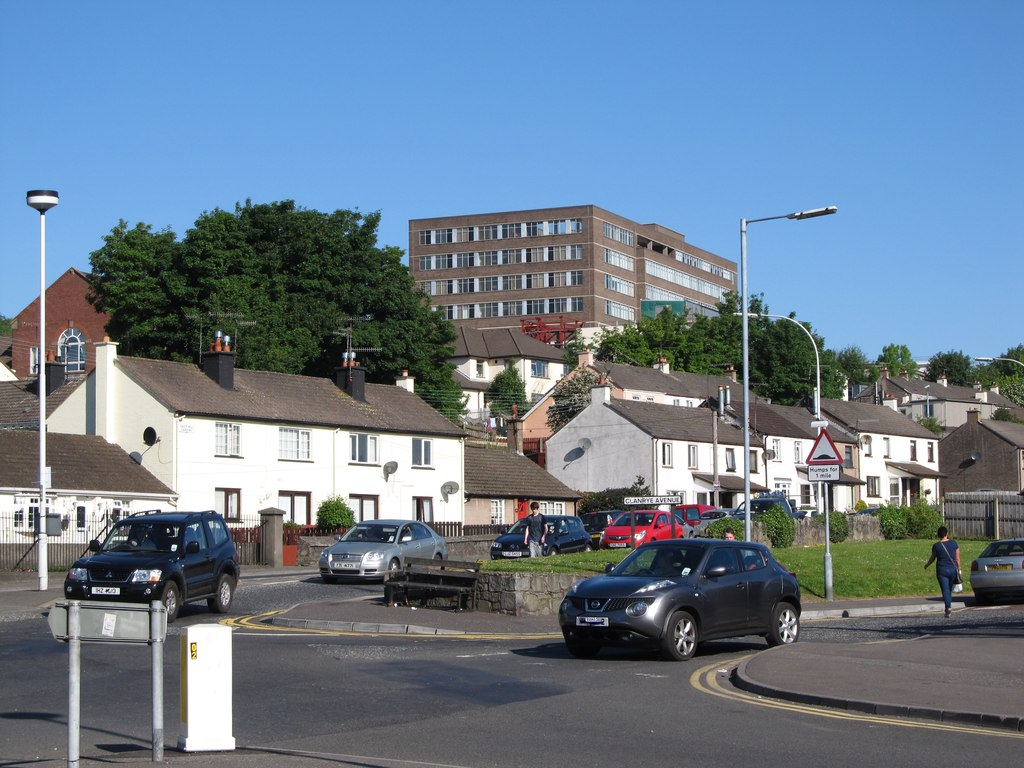
- Daisy Hill Hospital towering above Camlough Road

- Location in Northern Ireland

Geography
- Location: Newry, County Armagh, Northern Ireland
- Coordinates: 54.180°N 6.351°W

Organisation
- Care system: Health and Social Care in Northern Ireland
- Type: District General

Services
- Emergency department: Yes
- Beds: 150

History
- Founded: 1841

Links
- Website: www.southerntrust.hscni.net/1540.htm

Daisy Hill Hospital is an acute teaching hospital located in Newry, County Armagh, Northern Ireland.

It is situated on the Hospital Road and backs onto the A25 Camlough Road. It is managed by the Southern Health and Social Care Trust.

== History ==
The hospital has its origins in the Newry Union Workhouse and Infirmary completed in 1841. Following a major fire, the facilities were rebuilt in 1902. The facility was renamed Daisy Hill Hospital in the 1930s and a modern medical block was added in 1973.

In February 2003 the hospital was designated as one of the nine acute hospitals in the acute hospital network of Northern Ireland on which healthcare would be focused under the government health policy 'Developing Better Services'.

== University affiliations ==
The hospital is associated with the Queen's University Belfast Medical School.
