= Roxborough Castle =

Former building in County Tyrone, Northern Ireland

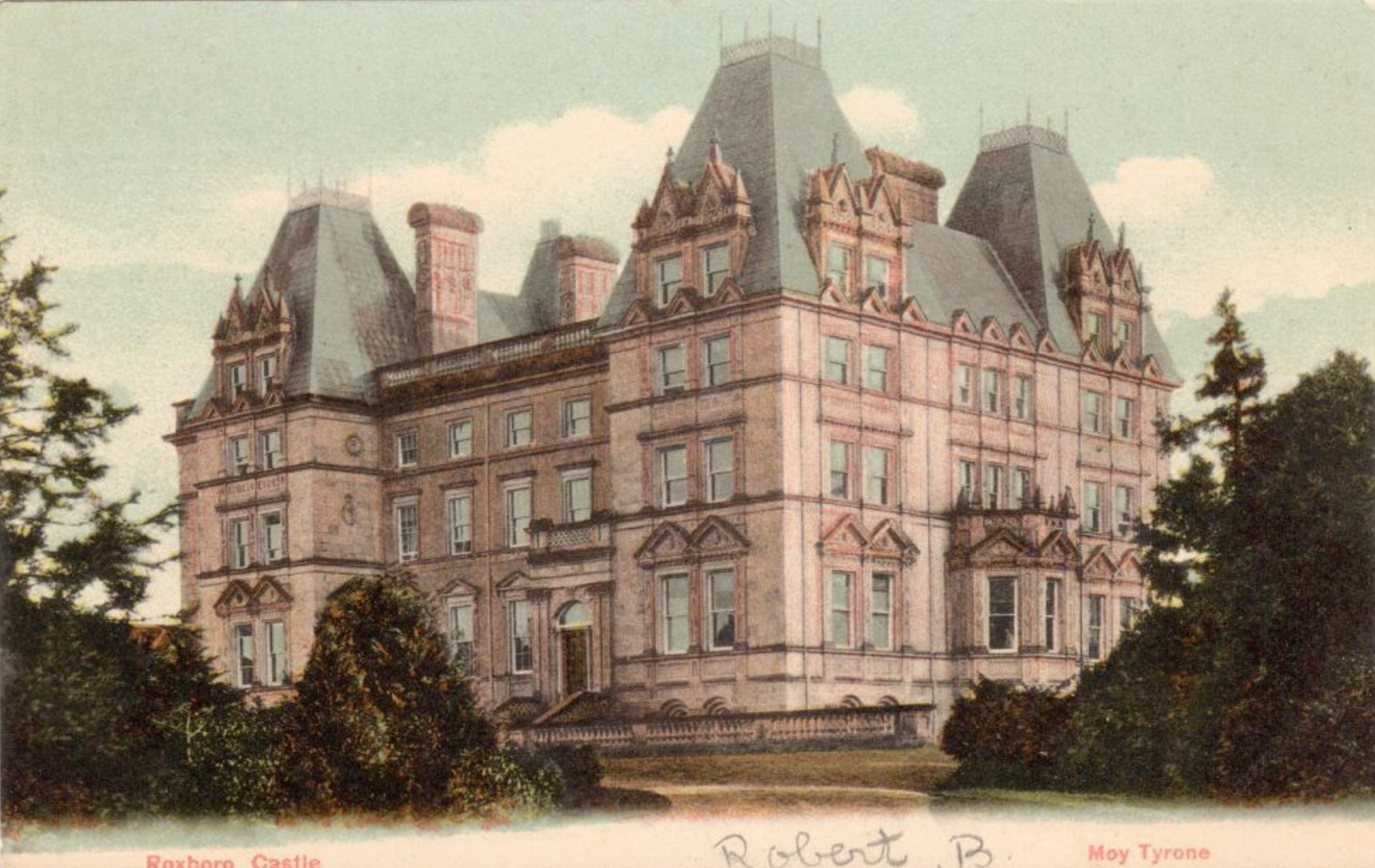
- Pre-1918 postcard of Roxborough Castle (Roxboro)
- Interactive map of the Roxborough Castle area

General information
- Location: Moy, County Tyrone
- Coordinates: 54.447°N 6.692°W
- Year built: 18th century
- Renovated: 1842; 1850-1855; 1864
- Destroyed: 1922

Renovating team
- Architects: Richard Turner; William Barre

Roxborough Castle was a castle in Moy, County Tyrone, Northern Ireland originally built in 1738. It was the seat of the Earls of Charlemont, along with Charlemont Fort, and was burned out by the Irish Republican Army in 1922.

Originally built in the 18th century it was remodelled by architect William Murray in 1842 for the second earl of Charlemont. Wings were added of one bay and two storeys over a basement, running the full length of the original block; these were in Murray's rather restrained Italianate style. The original block was given triangular window pediments and similar features so as to match the new wings. The entrance was moved round to the side of one of these wings, which became the new entrance front consisting of three bays with a low portico. The result was a house in the style of a French château. A conservatory, by Richard Turner, was added between c. 1850 and 1855.

In 1864 the third Earl began further remodelling, with some fittings being installed from the family's Dublin home, Charlemont House. The architect this time was William Barre.
