= Dalriada Hospital =

- Northern Health and Social Care Trust
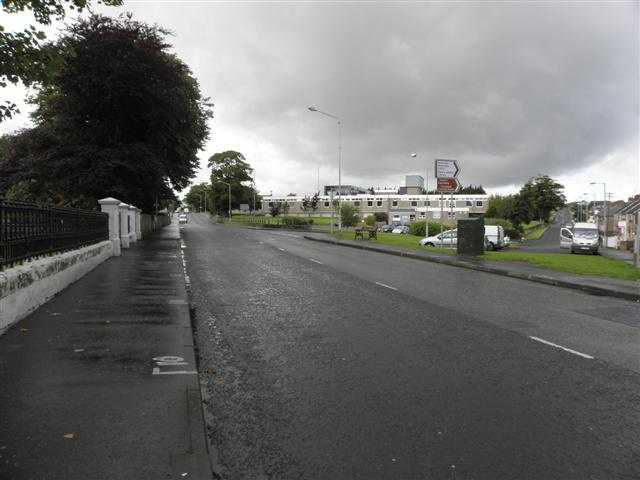
- Dalriada Hospital

- Location in Northern Ireland

Geography
- Location: Ballycastle, County Antrim, Northern Ireland
- Coordinates: 55.2003°N 6.2577°W

Organisation
- Care system: Health and Social Care in Northern Ireland
- Type: General

History
- Founded: 1842

The Dalriada Hospital is a health facility in Ballycastle, County Antrim, Northern Ireland. It is managed by the Northern Health and Social Care Trust.

== History ==
The facility has its origins in the Ballycastle Union Workhouse which was designed by George Wilkinson and was completed in October 1842. It became Dalriada District Hospital in 1924 and, after joining the National Health Service in 1948, became known as Dalriada Hospital. After the Trust announced the closure of the multiple sclerosis respite unit at the hospital, campaigners won a reprieve in the High Court in December 2014.
