= Antrim Area Hospital =

- Northern Health and Social Care Trust
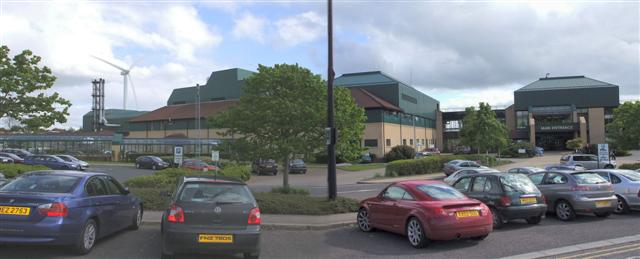
- Antrim Area Hospital

- Location in Northern Ireland

Geography
- Location: Antrim, County Antrim, Northern Ireland
- Coordinates: 54.7188°N 6.2229°W

Organisation
- Care system: Health and Social Care in Northern Ireland
- Type: District General

Services
- Emergency department: Yes

History
- Founded: 1994

Links
- Website: www.northerntrust.hscni.net/hospitals/303.htm
- Lists: Hospitals in Northern Ireland

The Antrim Area Hospital is a general hospital in Antrim, County Antrim, Northern Ireland. It is managed by the Northern Health and Social Care Trust.

== History ==
The hospital was commissioned to create extra healthcare capacity in the Antrim area. It was built at a cost of £40 million and was opened by the Prince of Wales in July 1994. In February 2003 it was designated as one of the nine acute hospitals in the acute hospital network of Northern Ireland on which healthcare would be focused under the government health policy 'Developing Better Services'. An extension to the emergency department and an extra 24 bed ward were completed in June 2013.
