= Northern Health and Social Care Trust =

Northern Ireland Health and Social Care Trust

- Type: Health and social care trust
- Established: 1 August 2006
- Headquarters: Bush Road; Antrim; BT41 2RL
- Population: 463,297
- Hospitals: Antrim Area Hospital; Braid Valley Care Complex; Causeway Hospital; Dalriada Hospital; Holywell Hospital; Mid-Ulster Hospital; Moyle Hospital; Robinson Hospital; Whiteabbey Hospital
- Staff: 10,370 (2018/19)
- Website: www.northerntrust.hscni.net

The Northern Health and Social Care Trust is a health and social care trust in Northern Ireland, responsible for providing services at various health facilities including Antrim Area Hospital, Braid Valley Care Complex, the Causeway Hospital and Mid-Ulster Hospital.

== History ==
The trust was established as the Northern Health and Social Services Trust on 1 August 2006, and became operational on 1 April 2007.

== Population ==
The area covered by Northern Health and Social Care Trust has a population of 463,297 residents according to the 2011 Northern Ireland census.
