= Banbridge Hospital =

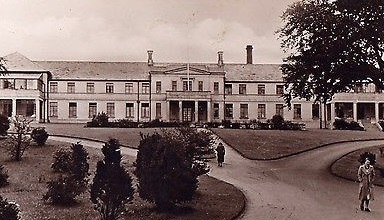
- Banbridge Hospital

- Location in Northern Ireland

Geography
- Location: Meeting House Road, Banbridge, Northern Ireland
- Coordinates: 54.3480°N 6.2766°W

Organisation
- Care system: Health and Social Care in Northern Ireland
- Type: Community

History
- Founded: 1841
- Closed: 1995

Banbridge Hospital was a health facility in Meeting House Road, Banbridge, Northern Ireland.

== History ==
The facility has its origins in the Banbridge Union Workhouse which was designed by George Wilkinson and was completed in June 1841. It became Banbridge District Hospital in 1932 and, after joining the National Health Service in 1948, it evolved to become Banbridge Hospital. Despite some investment in surgical wards in the 1980s, the hospital closed in 1995. The old hospital was subsequently demolished and the new Banbridge Health and Care Centre opened on part of the site in 2016.
