= St Luke's Hospital, Armagh =

St Luke's Hospital
- Southern Health and Social Care Trust
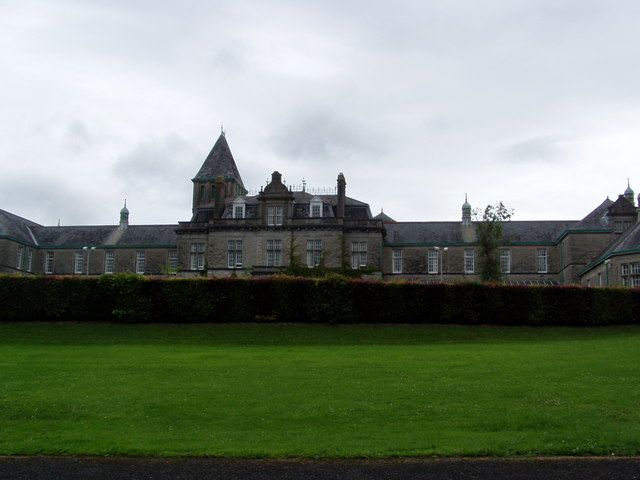
- The Hill Building

- Shown in Northern Ireland

Geography
- Location: Armagh, County Armagh,, Northern Ireland
- Coordinates: 54.36209°N 6.65225°W

Organisation
- Type: Specialist

Services
- Speciality: Psychiatric hospital

History
- Founded: 1825

Links
- Website: www.southerntrust.hscni.net/1551.htm

St Luke's Hospital is a psychiatric hospital in Armagh, County Armagh, Northern Ireland.

== History ==
The hospital, which was designed by Francis Johnston and William Murphy, opened as the Armagh Asylum in 1825. It expanded with the opening of the Hill Building in 1898. Following the introduction of Care in the Community in the early 1980s the hospital went into a period of decline and various facilities including inpatient dementia care and inpatient addiction services have been progressively withdrawn.
