= Health and Social Care (Northern Ireland) =

Publicly-funded healthcare system in Northern Ireland

Agency overview
- Formed: 6 July 1948; 78 years ago
- Jurisdiction: Northern Ireland
- Minister responsible: Robbie Butler, MLA
- Parent department: Department of Health
- Website: online.hscni.net

Health and Social Care (HSC) is the publicly funded healthcare system in Northern Ireland. The HSC grew out of the Health Services Act (Northern Ireland) 1948, which provided for a comprehensive health service similar to that introduced in England, Scotland and Wales the same year. Northern Ireland's health service, however, came to be modelled differently to that implemented in other parts of the United Kingdom. The Northern Ireland Executive through its Department of Health is responsible for its funding, while the Public Health Agency is the executive agency responsible for the provision of public health and social care services across Northern Ireland. It is free of charge to all citizens of Northern Ireland and the rest of the United Kingdom.

While sometimes called or considered part of the NHS, the HSC differs from the NHS in England, in Scotland and in Wales, in that the HSC provides not only health care but also social care. Social services are provided by local authorities in England and Wales.

== Organisation ==
Health Services Act (Northern Ireland) 1948
- Act of Parliament
- Parliament of Northern Ireland
- Citation: 1948 c. 3 (N.I.)

Dates
- Royal assent: 4 February 1948

The Health and Social Care service was created by the Parliament of Northern Ireland in 1948 after the Beveridge Report.

From 1948 to 1974, hospitals in the region were managed by the Northern Ireland Hospitals Authority and hospital management committees, and then transferred to four health and social services boards, along with responsibility for social care. The pattern of local government in the region was of 26 single-tier local authorities which, apart from Belfast, covered small populations ranging from 13,000 to 90,000 and were not considered an adequate base for the provision of personal social services.

Health and Social Care (Reform) Act (Northern Ireland) 2009
- Act of the Northern Ireland Assembly
- Northern Ireland Assembly
- Long title: An Act to make changes to the administrative structures for health and social care; and for connected purposes.
- Citation: 2009 c. 1 (N.I.)

Dates
- Royal assent: 21 January 2009

Text of statute as originally enacted

Text of the Health and Social Care (Reform) Act (Northern Ireland) 2009 as in force today (including any amendments) within the United Kingdom, from legislation.gov.uk.

The Health and Social Care (Reform) Act (Northern Ireland) 2009 (c. 1 (N.I.)) led to a reorganisation of health and social care delivery in Northern Ireland, reducing the number of organisations involved. This act established the Health and Social Care Board and five health and social care trusts which are responsible for the delivery of primary, secondary and community health care. The act also established five local commissioning groups which work in parallel with the health and social care trusts.

As of 2016, the Department of Health was organised under a Permanent Secretary into several groups and one agency. These are the Planning and Resources Group, Strategic Planning and Modernisation Group and Primary, Secondary and Community Care Group and the five professional groups. The department's executive agency responsible for the oversight, coordination and overall provision of health and social care services is the Public Health Agency.

The five professional groups are:

- Medical and Allied Services
- Social Services Inspectorate
- Nursing and Midwifery Advisory Group
- Dental Services
- Pharmaceutical Advice and Services

=== Trusts ===
A map showing the area of the five regional trusts, the Northern Ireland Ambulance Service Health and Social Care Trust is not shown as it covers all of Northern Ireland.

Trusts are the statutory bodies responsible for the management of staff, health and social care services on the ground and have control their own budgets. The 19 health and social services trusts were merged into six health and social care trusts, which became operational on 1 April 2007. The six trusts are:

- Belfast Health and Social Care Trust
- Northern Health and Social Care Trust
- Northern Ireland Ambulance Service Health and Social Care Trust
- South Eastern Health and Social Care Trust
- Southern Health and Social Care Trust
- Western Health and Social Care Trust

== Primary care ==
As of 2012, there were about 350 GP practices in the region.

In 2016 Michelle O'Neill produced a plan to install a named district nurse, health visitor and social worker in every practice. 54 pharmacists were to start in practices in December 2016 with one in every practice by 2021, with the number of GP training places to increase to 111.

The British Medical Association voted to start collecting undated resignations from Northern Ireland GPs in January 2017 in protest against the underfunding of general practice in the province. Less than 60% were collected. There was a decline in partners take-home pay in 2016/17, to £90,500. An investment package of £22 million was announced in 2018. £12.3 million is for pharmacists in practices. In May 2018 a £100 million Health and Social Care transformation funding package was announced, including £5 million for Multi Disciplinary Teams in two areas initially, each of about 100,000 people, which will involve the establishment of practice-based physiotherapists, mental health specialists and social workers working alongside doctors and nurses.

The first community hub for primary care in the province was to be established in Cookstown in 2018, backed by four local GP practices and the health board. It was to incorporate scanning facilities, a minor surgery suite, a pharmacy, out-of-hours consultations and community healthcare partnerships, with the possibility of developing supported living accommodation for older people.

In 2019 a £26,760,000 increase in funding for GPs was provided under the new contract. which is to support the recruitment of advanced nurse practitioners, practice-based pharmacists and other staff to support GPs.

== Pay parity ==
In November 2019 Unison members began industrial action in Belfast City Hospital, Craigavon, Musgrave Park and Omagh hospitals over unsafe staffing levels and the lack of pay parity with NHS staff in the rest of the UK. The Royal College of Nursing is also planning industrial action.

== Prescription charges ==
On 29 September 2008, Michael McGimpsey, the then Minister of Health, Social Services and Public Safety, announced that Prescription charges were to be phased out by April 2010, being first reduced to £3.00 in January 2009. This was widely accepted by the then four main parties of the Northern Ireland Executive plus the Alliance Party of Northern Ireland. The move brought Northern Ireland in line with the Scottish and Welsh systems which had already abolished charges.

== Performance ==
In Northern Ireland, health and social care have been part of the same structure since 1974; however, according to Terry Bamford in 2015, "integration has failed to address a reliance on hospitals and institutional care, which is significantly greater than elsewhere in the UK." He said that there are various reasons for this. It is difficult to get resources out of acute care without closing buildings, which is a political problem particularly in rural areas. Information technology systems may not be compatible and patient confidentiality hinders the sharing of information. Health services are free but social care is means tested. But, "the greatest difficulties lie in the different cultures and values of health and social care."

Until 2014, the Kingsbridge Private Hospital in Belfast was used to reduce waiting lists for routine surgery. In September 2015 the Northern Ireland Health and Social Care Board admitted that waiting lists for surgery had grown and that they did not have the money to pay either NHS providers or the private sector to bring them down.

In 2015, the NHS waiting list target in Northern Ireland was 52 weeks, not 18 as in England and 10% of healthcare provided in the region was paid for privately.

A report by the Nuffield Trust in 2017 showed that though spending per head in the province at £2,200 a year was much the same as the rest of the UK the performance of the system was much worse. Using the NHS targets more than 20% of patients waited more than 4 hours in A&E departments, and sometimes 30%. About 16% of the population were on a waiting list, compared with around 7% for the rest of the UK. More than 64,000 of them, around a quarter, had been waiting over a year for their first outpatient appointment. In the last 16 years there had been seven government reports calling for a move to more stress on prevention and away from hospital based care.

In 2018, hospital performance in the province was worse than the rest of the United Kingdom. All the five trusts failed their targets for A&E, cancer and routine operations for the whole of 2017–18. The Northern Ireland Audit Office reported in December 2018 that "the health and social care system, as currently configured, is simply unable to cope with the demands being placed on it." There is a deficit of £160 million and waiting times were unacceptable. None of the NHS targets have been met since 2015. 204 patients died in hospital in 2018 while waiting to be discharged largely because of a lack of domiciliary care packages.

In 2019, 205 homeless people in Northern Ireland died in an 18-month period, according to the Bureau of Investigative Journalism accounting for more than 25% of the 800 homeless deaths in the UK. Northern Ireland's population of 1.9 million is 2.8% of the UK total. The BBC reported in 2019 the case of a woman with multiple health problems who moved from County Armagh to Swansea and said the doctor she encountered in Bristol "was shocked" at the standard of medical care she had received from the Southern Health and Social Care Trust.

As of 2019, one in five Northern Irish cancer patients received their cancer diagnosis while attending an emergency department, because some patients wait too long on hospital lists and get taken to an emergency department instead. Heather Monteverde of Macmillan Cancer Support described the statistics as, "shocking and extremely worrying". Monteverde said emergency departments are unable to give the highly specialised care cancer patients need and that just 55% of Northern Irish cancer patients begin treatment within the 62-day target, and the number was, "deteriorating month-by-month". Cancer patients presenting via emergency departments have the lowest survival rates. 74% of the 4316 patients who died from cancer in 2015 were admitted to emergency departments during the last year of their lives. Only 85% of suspected breast cancer patients were seen within the target period of a fortnight.

=== Health care crisis, 2022–2024 ===
In May 2022 waiting times for outpatient appointments, hospital procedures, emergency care, GPs and community health services reached record levels. Tom Black chair of the British Medical Association Northern Ireland said the crisis boiled down to "workload and workforce" issues. Nearly one-in-five of the total population were on hospital waiting lists. For a hip replacement patients can wait between five or six years to be assessed, and up to another five years for the operation. In February 2022, 16.3% of attendees spent more than 12 hours in an emergency department. From February 2022-January 2024 Northern Ireland was without a devolved government. The DUP had boycotted the executive in protest over Brexit. In 2024, £3.3bn were to be spread across the public sector.

== Information technology ==
The Northern Ireland Electronic Care Record, developed from 2013, was extended to community optometrists in July 2019. Cloud21 (British) and Tegria (American) were engaged in 2022 to deliver the Encompass programme which will have a fully-integrated electronic health and care record across acute physical services, mental health, community care, and social services. This is the second such system in Western Europe.

== See also ==
- Healthcare in the United Kingdom
- Health & Social Care Business Services Organisation
- List of government departments, their agencies and their ministers in Northern Ireland
- List of hospitals in Northern Ireland
- National Health Service (England)
- NHS Scotland
- NHS Wales
- Health Service Executive (Ireland)
