= Timeline of the COVID-19 pandemic in Northern Ireland (2021) =

Daily Northern Irish events related to the COVID-19 pandemic during 2021

The following is a timeline of the COVID-19 pandemic in Northern Ireland during 2021. There are significant differences in the legislation and the reporting between the countries of the UK: England, Scotland, Northern Ireland, and Wales.

== Timeline ==
=== January 2021 ===
- 1 January –
  - Police in Northern Ireland issue 126 fines relating to illegal New Year house parties.
  - AQE, which administers post-primary tests in Northern Ireland, confirms its examination, scheduled for Saturday 9 January, will go ahead as planned.
  - Post-primary pupils will be required to wear face coverings in the classroom once the new school term begins, the Department of Education has announced.
- 2 January – Northern Ireland records a further 3,500 positive COVID tests and 26 deaths in the most recent 48 hours.
- 4 January – Rollout of the Oxford/AstraZeneca vaccine begins in Northern Ireland, with 11,000 doses planned to be given in the first week.
- 5 January –
  - The Northern Ireland Executive announces that a stay at home order will become law from Friday 8 January.
  - Figures indicate that almost 10,000 care home residents in Northern Ireland have received their first dose of the Pfizer/BioNTech vaccine.
- 6 January – Education Minister Peter Weir announces that GCSE, AS Level and A Level exams scheduled for summer 2021 will be cancelled because of the COVID-19 pandemic.
- 7 January –
  - Belfast Health Trust says it has had no choice but to cancel urgent cancer operations because of the demand on its hospitals from COVID-19 cases.
  - The major religious denominations in Northern Ireland have announced the suspension of public church services until February.
- 8 January –
  - At a meeting of the Northern Ireland Executive, ministers fail to agree on whether school transfer tests should be postponed because of COVID.
  - Guidelines issued by the Education Authority indicate there will be no school meals for vulnerable children or those of key workers until mid-February at the majority of schools in Northern Ireland, and no transport to and from school unless it is requested.
- 9 January – Lorry drivers from Northern Ireland travelling directly to France from the Irish Republic have been told they will need a recent negative COVID test in order to do so. Drivers have been using a route from Rosslare to Cherbourg to avoid UK delays caused by COVID.
- 10 January – All of Northern Ireland's six health trusts have forecast that the number of patients in hospital with COVID could double by the third week of January.
- 11 January – The Department of Health confirms that 91,954 doses of COVID vaccine have been administered in Northern Ireland.
- 12 January –
  - Chief Scientific Adviser Professor Ian Young says that Northern Ireland's R number has fallen "significantly" after the rate reached 1.8 following a relaxation of rules at Christmas. First Minister Arlene Foster the fall is down to people "doing the right thing".
  - The Department of Health publishes details of its vaccination plan.
- 13 January –
  - Health Minister Robin Swann confirms that over 100,000 COVID vaccines have been given in Northern Ireland.
  - The AQE transfer test for Year Seven pupils, which had been rescheduled for 27 February, has been cancelled.
  - Chief Medical Officer Dr Michael McBride apologises as demand for intensive care beds in Belfast means there are no facilities available for kidney transplant operations.
- 14 January –
  - First Minister Arlene Foster confirms that the Executive have agreed plans to require international travellers arriving in Northern Ireland from outside the UK and Republic of Ireland to produce a negative COVID test before departure.
  - Dr Nick Magee, a respiratory doctor at Belfast's Mater Hospital, warns oxygen supplies are under "extreme pressure".
- 15 January –
  - NISRA, Northern Ireland's statistics agency, records its highest number of weekly COVID deaths to date, with 145 recorded in the first week of January 2021.
  - First Minister Arlene Foster and deputy First Minister Michelle O'Neill hold talks with retailers in Northern Ireland over the sale of non-essential goods after Justice Minister Naomi Long called on them to stop selling non-essential items during lockdown.
  - The majority of hospital visits are suspended in Northern Ireland in a bid to halt the spread of COVID.
- 17 January – Jennifer Welsh, Chief Executive of the Northern Health and Social Care Trust, says that hospitals are preparing for a peak in admissions from COVID during the coming week.
- 18 January –
  - Justice Minister Naomi Long confirms that a number of prisoners released early because of the COVID-19 pandemic have been returned to prison due to criminal activity.
  - Finance Minister Conor Murphy unveils Northern Ireland's draft budget for the coming year, describing it as "difficult".
- 19 January – Health officials say that 154,000 doses of vaccine have been administered in Northern Ireland.
- 20 January –
  - Health Minister Robin Swann asks the Ministry of Defence to help medical staff out, primarily in hospitals.
  - The Western Trust cancels all urgent cancer surgery because of the COVID-19 pandemic.
- 21 January –
  - The lockdown restrictions for Northern Ireland are extended until 5 March.
  - Education Minister Peter Weir proposes prioritising headteachers for COVID vaccination to "enable continuity of learning".
  - "A £2m fund is announced for pig farmers financially affected by the closure of a meat processing factory in spring 2020 due to an outbreak of COVID.
- 22 January –
  - Health Minister Robin Swann says it is unrealistic to expect all lockdown restrictions to be lifted on 5 March.
  - BBC News Northern Ireland reports that plans are being drawn up by health trusts to ensure more urgent cancer treatment is provided in the coming week.
- Following the cancellation of transfer tests, it is reported that grammar schools in Northern Ireland will not use academic tests to admit pupils in 2021.
- 24 January – BBC News reports that testing capacity for the new COVID variant is limited, though testing is taking place.
- 25 January –
  - Finance Minister Conor Murphy confirms that almost £300m of funding set aside for tackling the impact of COVID-19 in the present financial year remains unspent.
  - First Minister Arlene Foster has described Northern Ireland's ability to test for variants of COVID as "massively more advanced" than that of the Republic of Ireland.
  - Police begin an investigation into possible breaches of COVID regulations at the funeral in Derry of Eamon McCourt, a member of the Provisional IRA who died from COVID-19.
  - The Safeguarding Board for Northern Ireland has reported a "sustained, noticeable drop" in the number of child protection referrals since schools were closed at the beginning of the present lockdown.
- 26 January –
  - The Department of Health confirms plans to vaccinate everyone in Northern Ireland over the age of 65 by the end of February.
  - It is confirmed that Professor Ian Young, Northern Ireland's Chief Scientific Adviser and a prominent figure during the pandemic, is on leave from his post due to health grounds.
- 27 January –
  - Health and Social Care confirms that people aged 65–69 can begin booking their COVID vaccinations.
  - Health Minister Robin Swann confirms that healthcare workers are to get a "special recognition" payment of £500 in recognition of their work during the pandemic.
- 28 January –
  - The Northern Ireland Executive agrees that most schools in Northern Ireland will not return until at least Monday 8 March.
  - The Department of Health confirms that Northern Ireland is to receive a "significant supply" of the Oxford–AstraZeneca vaccine the following week, allowing those aged over 70 to attend their local surgery for vaccination.
  - First Minister Arlene Foster confirms that the Kent variant of COVID accounts for between 40% and 50% of cases.
- 29 January –
  - Amid an ongoing row over vaccine shortfalls in the European Union, the European Commission announces the introduction of controls on vaccines made in the bloc, including to Northern Ireland. Responding to the announcement, Prime Minister Boris Johnson says the EU must "urgently clarify its intentions", while First Minister Arlene Foster describes the move as "an incredible act of hostility". The Commission later reverses the decision, which overrides the Northern Ireland Protocol element of the Brexit Agreement, and says that Northern Ireland will not be affected.
  - A further 182 COVID deaths were recorded in the week ending 22 January, making it the highest weekly death rate of the pandemic so far.
- 30 January – Cabinet Office Minister Michael Gove says he is "confident" vaccine supplies and the UK's vaccine programme can continue as planned, and that the EU "made a mistake" by triggering emergency provisions in the Brexit agreement.
- 31 January –
  - Police are warning the public to be aware of a scam offering a fake COVID vaccination; the recipient receives a text message inviting them to click on a link which asks for their bank details.
  - Police are reported to be investigating potential COVID breaches after a large crowd gathered for the funeral of senior Ulster Volunteer Force figure Hugh Hill in North Belfast two days earlier.

=== February 2021 ===
- 1 February –
  - Health Minister Robin Swann confirms that as of Sunday 31 January, 246,421 COVID vaccinations had been given in Northern Ireland.
  - BBC News reports that some staff members at special schools will be prioritised for COVID vaccination.
  - The Orange Order postpones a parade celebrating the centenary of the establishment of Northern Ireland that was scheduled for 29 May. It has also advised that no parades should take place in June.
- 2 February – GCSE, AS and A Level qualifications will be calculated by schools in 2021, it is confirmed.
- 3 February –
  - Health Minister Robin Swann confirms that COVID cases are falling in Northern Ireland, but that they are still "too high".
  - Figures published by the Department of Health show that 4,000 "red flag" cancer procedures, including surgery and endoscopies, have been cancelled since the beginning of the pandemic.
- 4 February – First Minister Arlene Foster confirms that 263,735 people in Northern Ireland have received their first COVID vaccination.
- 5 February –
  - The police watchdog launches an investigation after a victim of the 1992 Sean Graham bookmakers' shooting was arrested for COVID rule breaches at a memorial service marking the anniversary of the shooting. An officer is subsequently suspended over the incident, and another redeployed to other duties.
  - The number of vaccinations delivered in Northern Ireland stands at 301,279, with 275,232 first doses and 26,047 second vaccines. But announcing these figures, Health Minister Robin Swann warns people against complacency.
- 8 February – People from Northern Ireland crossing the border into the Republic of Ireland without a reasonable excuse are being sent back by Gardai, and face a fine of €100 (£88).
- 9 February –
  - At a medical briefing, Dr Michael McBride, Northern Ireland's Chief Medical Officer, says it will not be possible to fully lift COVID restrictions until between 70% and 80% of people have been vaccinated. At present, 22% of Northern Ireland's population have been vaccinated, with most care home residents having received their second vaccination.
  - The Irish Government has said talks are ongoing with the European Union to prevent further difficulties for Northern Ireland when receiving COVID-19 vaccinations from Europe.
  - A report published by the British Red Cross highlights the effect the pandemic has had on loneliness in Northern Ireland, and urges the Executive to develop a strategy for dealing with loneliness.
- 10 February – Health Minister Robin Swann says that Northern Ireland must "tread carefully" when it comes to easing COVID restrictions, and that some measures may need to stay in place for a while.
- 11 February – Minister of Finance Conor Murphy says the Executive will take a "collective approach" to the upcoming review of Northern Ireland's lockdown, which will occur on Thursday 18 February.
- 12 February – The 80,000 people who received GPs letters advising them to shield are told they can now book appointments for COVID vaccinations.
- 14 February – Dr Tom Black, chairman of the British Medical Association in Northern Ireland, says it would be a "big ask" to reopen secondary schools on 8 March, but that he believes primary schools could reopen then.
- 15 February –
  - The number of recorded deaths linked to COVID-19 reaches 2,000.
  - BBC News reports that at a meeting with school principals, the Public Health Agency has said that schools are not a major source of transmission of COVID-19.
- 17 February – The rollout of the vaccination programme is extended to carers and those with underlying health conditions.
- 18 February – Lockdown is extended in Northern Ireland until 1 April amid concerns that there could be a rise in cases prompted by St Patrick's Day celebrations, but schools will begin to reopen from 8 March, with Primary Years One to Three reopening.
- 19 February – Health Minister Robin Swann downplays the possibility of easing lockdown restrictions in time for Easter, saying that plans to reopen society, due to be published on 1 March, will be led by data rather than dates.
- 21 February – After Prime Minister Boris Johnson announces new vaccination targets to offer every adult in the UK their first vaccine by the end of July, officials in Northern Ireland have said the COVID vaccination programme in Northern Ireland is "ahead of schedule".
- 22 February –
  - First Minister Arlene Foster wants the Northern Ireland Executive to "revisit" the timetable for reopening schools after Prime Minister Boris Johnson announced all schools in England will reopen on 8 March. Currently only primary schools are scheduled to reopen on that date.
  - Health Minister Robin Swann announces that Belfast's SSE Arena is to become a mass vaccination centre.
- 23 February –
  - Education Minister Peter Weir says there is a "strong case" for reopening all schools in Northern Ireland on 8 March.
  - The Department of Health confirms that three cases of South African variant COVID-19 have been detected in Northern Ireland.
- 24 February –
  - The Department of Health confirms that more than half a million COVID vaccinations have been given in Northern Ireland, 478,235 of them first doses.
  - As the Northern Ireland Executive prepares to publish its exit strategy from lockdown in the next few days, Health Minister Robin Swann says it is better to be "too cautious than reckless" over easing the restrictions, and urges people not to jump to conclusions on the matter.
- 25 February –
  - First Minister Arlene Foster says she has complete confidence in Dr Michael McBride, Northern Ireland's Chief Medical Officer, after the Democratic Unionist Party said health officials had acted too cautiously over their advice on opening schools.
  - DUP MP Sammy Wilson is criticised for describing Health Minister Robin Swann as a "poodle for the unaccountable chief medical officer" on social media.
  - Education Minister Peter Weir confirms GCSE, AS Level and A Level results will be published earlier in August, mirroring a decision made in England, with AS and A Level results published on 10 August and GCSE results two days later.
- 26 February – Health Minister Robin Swann tells the BBC that delayed decisions and party politics during the COVID-19 pandemic have inevitably cost lives, while the public health message has been damaged by politicians failing to stand together.
- 27 February – On the date that marks a year since the first positive COVID case in Northern Ireland, figures show that 35% of people have been vaccinated against the virus.
- 28 February – Police break up a crowd of 250 gathered to watch an "organised fight" in a yard in County Tyrone, an event in breach of COVID rules.

=== March 2021 ===
- 1 March –
  - A change in rules regarding hospitals and other care settings allows care home residents to receive at least one face-to-face visit per week from one person. Daily one-hour visits to hospices are also permitted, while women attending maternity appointments can take someone with them.
  - Ministers meet to discuss easing lockdown restrictions, but delay the publication in order to finalise their plans.
  - People aged 60–64 are invited to book online for a COVID vaccination.
- 2 March – Northern Ireland unveils what deputy First Minister Michelle O'Neill describes as a "hopeful and cautious" exit strategy from lockdown, but unlike England and Scotland there is timetable for lifting the measures. Instead ministers will meet each week to assess the information available to them and decide which restrictions can be lifted. First Minister Arlene Foster acknowledges the frustration felt by people but says the Northern Ireland Executive has learnt a lot about the virus over the past year.
- 3 March –
  - Chancellor Rishi Sunak unveils the 2021 budget, with an extra £410m for Northern Ireland. However, Finance Minister Conor Murphy claims as most of the funding is COVID-related, in real terms the additional funding for Northern Ireland only amounts to £4m.
  - Health Minister Robin Swann acknowledges people's frustration at the lack of dates in the Executive's lockdown exit strategy, but says there are too many uncertainties to give specific dates.
- 4 March – Health Minister Robin Swann rules out the idea of vaccine passports for people visiting pubs or restaurants, saying the idea is "not something that sits comfortably" with him.
- 5 March – Figures published by the Northern Ireland Statistics and Research Agency (NISRA) indicate COVID deaths have fallen for a fifth consecutive week, with the virus mentioned on 55 death certificates in the week up to 26 February.
- 7 March – Speaking to RTÉ Radio 1's This Week programme, First Minister Arlene Foster says she is "alarmed" at the slower rate of COVID vaccination rollout in the Republic of Ireland, and says there should be greater co-operation between the Northern Ireland Executive and Irish Government on the issue of vaccine deployment.
- 8 March –
  - Pupils in Years P1 to P3 return to school. The plan is for them to return to remote learning on 22 March, but Education Minister Peter Weir announces plans to change this to allow for them to stay in the classroom, saying the present plans do not make "enormous sense".
  - Dr Margaret O'Brien, the Head of General Medical Services at the Health and Social Care Board writes to GPs informing them Northern Ireland will shortly receive a "significant" delivery of COVID vaccine that will need to be used before the end of March.
- 10 March – Rapid COVID tests are to be rolled out to workers in the agri-food, manufacturing, essential retail and construction sectors.
- 11 March –
  - The Northern Ireland Executive agrees to keep children in nursery, preschool and years one to three in class after 22 March, rather than reverting to remote learning as originally planned.
  - Queen's University Belfast and the University of Ulster have released figures showing the number of students suspended for breaches of COVID rules, with 229 QUB students suspended since August, and 263 from UU since September. The universities describe themselves as having "stringent" and "robust" disciplinary procedures in place for those who breach regulations.
- 12 March – The UK Government agrees to deploy 100 military medical personnel to Northern Ireland to help with the accelerated rollout of the vaccine.
- 14 March –
  - Health officials in Northern Ireland announce that use of the Oxford–AstraZeneca vaccine will continue in Northern Ireland after its use was suspended in the Irish Republic amid concerns about possible links to blood clotting events in Norway.
  - No further deaths are recorded for Northern Ireland over the preceding 24 hours; 2,098 COVID deaths have been recorded throughout the pandemic.
- 15 March –
  - People aged over 50 become eligible to book a COVID vaccine; Health Minister Robin Swann tells the Stormont Assembly that 30,000 vaccinations are booked in the first three hours of availability.
  - Swann announces that all post-primary education staff, and pupils in years 12–14 are to receive twice-weekly lateral flow tests from the week beginning 22 March.
  - The Department of Finance makes available £1.78m in business support grants.
- 16 March –
  - First Minister Arlene Foster announces some changes to COVID restrictions. All primary schools will return from 22 March, with all secondary schools returning from 12 April. From 1 April changes to meeting up will occur, along with some sports being allowed to resume. On the eve of St Patrick's Day, Foster warns the celebration "must be different" this year.
  - Health Minister Robin Swann confirms that almost 17,000 procedures, operations and diagnostic tests have been cancelled during the pandemic; these include more than 4,000 red flag cancer procedures.
- 17 March –
  - Responding to criticism about the lack of dates for releasing lockdown restrictions, First Minister Arlene Foster says she understands that people want the restrictions lifted, but at the same time she does not want to have to "step backwards" again.
  - Police are called to Belfast's Botanic Gardens to disperse crowds gathered to celebrate St Patrick's Day.
  - Northern Ireland's four main churches announce plans to resume public services by Easter, with the Catholic Church planning to resume services from Friday 26 March, and the Church of Ireland, Presbyterian and Methodist churches planning to resume services from 2 April (Good Friday).
- 18 March –
  - Health Minister Robin Swann says that all adults in Northern Ireland will get their first COVID vaccine by the end of July in spite of an expected reduction in UK vaccines.
  - Teachers will not be required to carry out COVID tests on pupils in years 12 to 14, it is confirmed.
- 20 March – Northern Ireland has another day in which no COVID deaths are recorded.
- 21 March – The Public Health Agency confirms the vaccination of Northern Ireland's homeless is underway, with 1,200 homeless people set to receive a vaccine in the coming weeks.
- 22 March –
  - All primary school pupils, and those in years 12 to 14 of secondary education return to face-to-face learning.
  - Figures released by the Police Service of Northern Ireland show that 8,000 COVID related fines have been issued by them since the start of the pandemic.
- 23 March – The Department of Education confirms that around 700 staff working at special schools in Northern Ireland have been given priority for COVID vaccination.
- 24 March –
  - No further COVID deaths are reported for the most recent 24-hour period.
  - Health Minister Robin Swann says that foreign travel over the summer holidays should be ruled out, and even travel to the Republic of Ireland is dependent on vaccine rollout.
  - The Catholic Diocese of Derry postpones First Communions amid concerns they could encourage people to have parties.
- 25 March –
  - No further COVID deaths are reported for Northern Ireland for a second day in a row.
  - Official figures show that 703,334, almost half the adult population, have had their first COVID vaccine, while 104,907 have had their second.
  - Doctors have expressed concern about the level of COVID cases in the Derry City and Strabane District Council area, which has Northern Ireland's highest COVID rates, and call for better cross-border co-operation with the Republic of Ireland.
- 26 March –
  - No COVID-related deaths are reported for Northern Ireland for a third day in a row.
  - Catholic churches in Northern Ireland reopen for public worship in what is described as "cautious and careful" return.
- 27 March – First Minister Arlene Foster is given her first COVID jab at a vaccination centre in County Fermanagh and says that she is "delighted" to receive the injection.
- 29 March –
  - Northern Ireland records another day without any COVID deaths.
  - Belfast's SSE Arena opens as a mass vaccination centre.
  - Plans are being developed by the Department of Finance and trade unions representing civil servants for what is described as an "enduring" remote work policy for Northern Ireland's civil service after the pandemic.
- 31 March – Health Minister Robin Swann receives his first COVID vaccination at a pharmacy in Ballymena.

=== April 2021 ===
- 1 April –
  - The Department of Education confirms that all children will return to school on 12 April.
  - The Northern Ireland Executive agrees a £290m plan to help economic recovery following the pandemic.
- 2 April –
  - Figures show the number of COVID-related deaths has risen slightly after falling for eight consecutive weeks, with 19 death certificates mentioning the virus in the week ending 26 March.
  - Health Minister Robin Swann urges people to stay safe over the weekend, as the "stay at home" message remains despite the lifting of some restrictions.
- 6 April – First Minister Arlene Foster says she is hopeful that dates for the reopening of hairdressers and non-essential retail will be confirmed at the next meeting of the Executive.
- 7 April – Northern Ireland records another day without any further COVID-related deaths.
- 8 April – People in Northern Ireland aged 40–44 are invited to book their COVID vaccinations.
- 10 April – As the Department of Health announces that the milestone of a million vaccinations has been reached in Northern Ireland, Health Minister Robin Swann describes it as "a landmark" and urges people to remember "how serious the situation was at the turn of the year".
- 12 April –
  - Pupils from all year groups return to face-to-face teaching.
  - The "stay at home" message is relaxed and replaced with a "stay local" message. Ten people from two households can meet in a private garden and up to 15 people are allowed to take part in sports training together.
  - Outdoor retail, such as garden centres and car washes, reopen along with non-essential retailers resuming click and collect services.
  - Belfast's Nightingale Hospital, based at the City Hospital, is stood down again.
- 13 April –
  - Northern Ireland reports another day without any COVID-related deaths.
  - Health Minister Robin Swann tells the Northern Ireland Assembly it could take ten years to clear Northern Ireland's backlog of hospital waiting lists unless there is significant investment from the Executive.
- 14 April – Health Minister Robin Swann says the "scales are tipping" in favour of an acceleration of lifting COVID rules.
- 15 April – Stormont gives the go-ahead for outdoor hospitality, gyms and non-essential retail to reopen on 30 April, and for indoor hospitality to reopen on 24 May.
- 16 April – Northern Ireland's hotel quarantine rules come into effect, requiring passengers arriving from "red list" countries to go into quarantine.
- 18 April – Northern Ireland records another day with no further COVID related deaths.
- 19 April – Vaccination appointments are made available to a limited number of adults aged 35–39.
- 21 April – Patricia Donnelly, who leads Northern Ireland's vaccine programme, confirms "pop up" vaccination centres are to be established in areas where take up of the vaccine is low.
- 22 April –
  - Figures produced by the Trussell Trust, the UK's largest food bank charity, show that 31,000 food parcels were provided to children in Northern Ireland between April 2020 and March 2021.
  - On the eve of the further easing of COVID restrictions, First Minister Arlene Foster says the process will move faster if possible, but this will depend on the effect of those relaxations.
- 23 April –
  - Close contact services such as hairdressers are reopened, while driving tests can resume.
  - Outdoor visitor attractions reopen.
- 25 April – Northern Ireland records another day with no further COVID related deaths.
- 26 April – All people in Northern Ireland aged 35–39 can now book a vaccine.
- 27 April – Economists at the EY consultancy firm predict Northern Ireland's economy will grown by up to 6% in 2021.
- 28 April – Ahead of the reopening of outdoor hospitality in Northern Ireland, the regulations surrounding the reopening of venues are described as being chaotic by Hospitality Ulster, particularly as some venues have been told they cannot reopen unless their seating areas adhere to the regulations.
- 29 April –
  - Northern Ireland records another day with no further COVID related deaths.
  - Hospitality Ulster says the majority of venues scheduled to reopen for outdoor hospitality have failed COVID safety checks.
- 30 April –
  - Non-essential retail, bars, cafes, gyms and swimming pools are reopened in the latest easing of coronavirus restrictions for Northern Ireland.
  - All people in Northern Ireland aged 30–34 can now book a vaccine.

=== May 2021 ===
- 1 May – A bar in Fintona, County Tyrone is fined £1,000 for breaching COVID rules after police broke up a gathering of 150 people. A police officer was also punched and knocked unconscious during the course of inspecting the premises, and one teenager was later charged with assaulting a police officer in relation to the incident.
- 3 May – Northern Ireland records another day with no further COVID related deaths.
- 4 May – Health Minister Robin Swann confirms changes to hospital and care home settings from Friday 7 may; hospital patients can have up to two visitors a day from two separate households, while care home residents can have two one-hour visits per week from two people.
- 5 May –
  - Northern Ireland records another day without any COVID related deaths.
  - Figures show that car sales increased by an annual rate of 14,000% in April 2021 compared to the same month in 2020.
  - The Housing Executive has reported a 150% increase in the number of people seeking emergency accommodation during 2020.
- 6 May – Seven cases of the Indian Variant of COVID-19 are discovered in Northern Ireland.
- 7 May – A UK-wide decision to offer adults under 40 an alternative to the Oxford–AstraZeneca vaccine could delay Northern Ireland's vaccination programme, but people are being urged to continue coming forward. Under 40s will be offered the Pfizer–BioNTech vaccine, but health officials say the decision to do so is not connected to any new information regarding the blood clot risk associated with the Oxford vaccine, but a change in the risk/benefit to younger people by falling COVID levels.
- 8 May –
  - Northern Ireland records another day without any COVID related deaths.
  - With travel restrictions set to be relaxed in England, Belfast International Airport and three ferry companies serving Northern Ireland call for the lifting of restrictions between the UK and Ireland.
- 9 May – Northern Ireland records another day without any COVID related deaths.
- 10 May – Northern Ireland records another day without any COVID related deaths.
- 11 May – Derry City and Strabane District Council confirms the Clipper Round the World Yacht Race will return to Derry in 2022.
- 12 May – Deputy First Minister Michelle O'Neill says Northern Ireland is winning its fight against COVID and that it is hoped there can soon be a further easing of restrictions.
- 13 May – The Executive announces further easing of restrictions planned to come into force from 24 May, including allowing non essential travel to Northern Ireland from other parts of the Common Travel Area, allowing spectators to attend sporting events, and allowing for the reopening of libraries and museums.
- 15 May –
  - The Northern Ireland Tourism Alliance and ABTA urge Stormont to rethink changes to travel arrangements for people arriving from the Common Travel Area from 24 May, describing them as "unmanageable". From that date travellers from the Common Travel Area will not be required to isolate, but must provide a lateral flow COVID test upon departure and at later dates.
  - After images of Glasgow Rangers fans celebrating appear on social media following the club's triumph in the 2020–21 Scottish Premiership, police warn people not to gather in the Shankill Road area of Belfast.
- 16 May – Northern Ireland records two consecutive days without any COVID related deaths.
- 18 May – The number of people in Northern Ireland to receive their first COVID vaccine passes one million, meaning roughly 69% of the population have been vaccinated with their first dose.
- 20 May –
  - Stormont gives the go-ahead for indoor hospitality to reopen from Monday 24 May, when six people from two separate households will be permitted to meet up indoors. A traffic lights system for overseas travel will also begin on the same day.
  - People aged 25–29 become eligible for their first COVID vaccination.
  - The Northern Ireland Executive has allocated £316m for COVID recovery.
  - A letter emerges sent to Stormont by PSNI Chief Constable Simon Byrne on 17 April 2020 in which he warns that public confidence in the police could be undermined by asking them to enforce lockdown restrictions.
- 21 May – The Irish Government says it is "keeping an interest" in including Northern Ireland residents who hold Irish passports in an EU COVID certificate scheme.
- 24 May – Indoor hospitality is permitted to reopen, while six people from two separate households can meet up indoors again.
- 27 May –
  - COVID vaccinations are opened to everyone aged 18 and over in Northern Ireland, making it the first part of the UK to offer the vaccine to all adults.
  - The Northern Ireland Executive agrees to scrap its advice for travellers to the Common Travel Area following criticism from the tourism sector.
  - Health Minister Robin Swann warns that the size of Northern Ireland's hospital waiting lists threatens to undermine the principle of a free health service as figures show 335,000 people are waiting for a consultant-led appointment.
- 29 May – The latest health figures show that COVID rates have fallen slightly in Northern Ireland. They are fairly low in Northern Ireland, but remain above those for England and Wales.
- 31 May – About 100 military personnel who were deployed to help at the vaccination centre established in Belfast's SSE Arena withdraw after ending their duties there.

=== June 2021 ===
- 1 June – The Grand Orange Lodge of Ireland confirms the Twelfth of July parades will go ahead for 2021.
- 2 June –
  - Health Minister Robin Swann tells Ulster Unionist Assembly members the health service is in "big trouble" and requires "unprecedented collective action from the executive".
  - Fourteen people reported to the Public Prosecution Service for Northern Ireland over their participation in Black Lives Matter demonstrations in 2020 will not face prosecution it is confirmed.
- 4 June –
  - As many as 2,500 people have changed their second COVID vaccinations in the past seven to ten days, prompting a warning that doing so threatens to jeopardise the vaccination programme. Second vaccination appointments are usually generated when a first appointment is booked, but people have been rearranging their second appointments through fear about the Indian variant.
  - People in parts of Kilkeel, County Down are being asked to volunteer for COVID testing after a small cluster of Indian variant COVID cases were found there.
- 5 June – Three testing centres are opened in Kilkeel amid concerns about Indian COVID.
- 6 June –
  - The BBC reports that testing for Indian variant COVID in Kilkeel has identified no more than five cases.
  - The Royal Black Institution cancels the annual sham fight at Scarva in County Down for the second year in a row.
- 7 June – Fifteen cases of COVID have been discovered through surge testing in Kilkeel, nine of which are believed to be Indian variant COVID.
- 8 June – Northern Ireland records another day without any COVID related deaths.
- 9 June – BBC News reports that the number of Indian variant COVID cases in Ireland has doubled to 80.
- 10 June –
  - In a document from the Department of Health to the Northern Ireland Executive, Health Minister Robin Swann warns "Normality, as we knew it in 2019, is still some way off".
  - The gap between first and second COVID vaccines is reduced from 10 to 12 weeks to eight weeks, the Department of Health confirms.
  - A series of concerts planned by Van Morrison at Belfast's Europa Hotel are cancelled due to COVID restrictions. The hotel had hoped to have them classed as trial events for the return of large gatherings.
- 13 June – Dr Frances O'Hagan, a GP in Northern Ireland, says people need to "look over [their] shoulders" as cases of Indian variant COVID rise.
- 15 June – Health Minister Robin Swann sets out a five-year roadmap to clear hospital waiting lists by March 2026.
- 16 June –
  - The latest figures indicate the number of possible or confirmed cases of Indian variant COVID stand at 254, a rise from 111 the previous week.
  - Infrastructure Minister Nichola Mallon confirms that full MoT testing will return on 26 July.
- 17 June –
  - Plans to ease restrictions in Northern Ireland are pushed back to 5 July.
  - Paul Givan succeeds Arlene Foster as First Minister of Northern Ireland.
- 18 June – There have been 906 new COVID cases recorded for Northern Ireland in the past seven days, a rise of 278 on the previous week. No deaths are recorded for 18 June.
- 20 June – Northern Ireland records another day without any COVID related deaths.
- 22 June – Around 9,000 students at Queen's University Belfast and Ulster University are to receive an additional payment of £495 from the Stormont Executive for disruption to their education caused by the COVID crisis. This is in addition to £500 to be paid to around 40,000 students in Northern Ireland.
- 23 June – Figures released by Nisra show one death has been linked to an allergic reaction to COVID vaccine in Northern Ireland. The death occurred in the first quarter of the year.
- 24 June – The Department of Health says a paper based COVID passport scheme could be ready to launch by early July.
- 27 June –
  - Walk in vaccinations become available for all over 18s in Northern Ireland, with a vaccination centre opening at Belfast's SSE Arena. Further walk in centres are planned in the coming days.
  - Northern Ireland passes two million vaccinations, with 80% of adults having received a first vaccination and around 60% a second.
  - Northern Ireland records another day without any COVID related deaths.
- 28 June – Northern Ireland records another day without any COVID related deaths.
- 30 June –
  - Northern Ireland records the highest number of daily COVID cases since February, with 375 new cases. The figures prompt the senior health officials to urge younger people to get vaccinated.
  - The Orange Order announces that the Twelfth of July will be marked by 100 smaller parades rather than the 18 large parades that usually take place to mark the occasion.

=== July 2021 ===
- 1 July –
  - The Executive agrees to allow live music to resume from 5 July. There will be a restriction on the volume for indoor concerts which must be at an ambient level only, with screens placed in front of the musicians, while no volume level will be set for outdoor music.
  - The Department of Health announces plans to introduce and "emergency interim plan" to allow people to travel abroad ahead of its vaccine certificate scheme, due to begin later in July.
- 2 July –
  - COVIDCert, a temporary scheme to allow Northern Ireland residents to prove they have been vaccinated when travelling abroad, is established and will be in place until 19 July.
  - The Department of Health says that around 600 companies have expressed interest in its workforce testing programme to provide rapid tests for employees.
- 3 July – With around 60% of people in Northern Ireland having received both vaccinations, another day of walk in clinics is held across Northern Ireland.
- 4 July –
  - Northern Ireland records another day without any COVID related deaths, but there are 533 new cases of the virus.
  - Professor Ian Young, Northern Ireland's Chief Scientific Adviser, says that hospital admissions could be reduced by half if 90% of people have been vaccinated by the end of July.
- 5 July –
  - Northern Ireland records another 420 COVID cases but no further deaths.
  - Chief Medical Officer Dr Michael McBride suggests Northern Ireland is experiencing a fourth COVID wave and says there is no reason not to get the vaccine.
  - Figures indicate more than 4,500 holidaymakers have applied for short term vaccine passports.
- 6 July – Deputy First Minister Michelle O'Neill has described as reckless Prime Minister Boris Johnson's plans to end all COVID restrictions for England on 19 July.
- 7 July –
  - Northern Ireland records another day without any COVID deaths; 570 new cases are recorded over the same period.
  - Infrastructure Minister Nichola Mallon has said people should continue to wear masks on public transport, even when no longer legally required to do so.
- 8 July –
  - The Executive confirms that fully vaccinated people arriving into Northern Ireland from amber list countries will no longer be required to quarantine from 26 July.
  - Theatres in Northern Ireland are given a provisional date to reopen on 26 July, but this must be ratified by the executive on 22 July.
- 9 July –
  - Visiting to hospitals in Derry is suspended amid a number of COVID cases in the hospitals.
  - First Minister Paul Givan has said that a "very high level of personal responsibility" Will be needed from people to enable everybody to live with Covid.
- 10 July – Northern Ireland holes another weekend walking vaccination clinics.
- 12 July –
  - Northern Ireland records another day without any COVID related deaths, but there are 528 new cases.
  - The 12th of July parades are held, and pass without incident. Several smaller parades are held this year due to COVID restrictions.
- 13 July – The Department of Health says software developers are working to have Northern Ireland vaccination certificate system up and running by the following week.
- 14 July – More walk-in vaccination clinics are announced for Northern Ireland, and will open in the coming weeks.
- 15 July –
  - The Executive announces that quarantine restrictions from amber list countries will no longer apply to fully vaccinated people from 19 July.
  - More than 1,000 new daily COVID cases are reported. Health Minister Robin Swann describes the news as "alarming".
- 16 July – Northern Ireland records 1,380 new COVID cases, but no deaths.
- 17 July – Another weekend of walk in vaccination clinics begins.
- 18 July – The majority of Irish passport holders in Northern Ireland will not be able to use the EU Digital COVID Certificate, despite the Irish Government previously suggesting they would be able to do so.
- 22 July – The Executive delays a decision on the reopening of theatres and concert halls for a week.
- 23 July – The Department of Health launches Northern Ireland's vaccine certification app, CovidCertNI.
- 24 July – Demonstrations are held in Belfast, and in Dublin in the Irish Republic, against COVID-19 restrictions and the vaccination programme.
- 25 July –
  - The Department of Health confirms that more than a million people in Northern Ireland (roughly 70% of the adult population) have had both COVID vaccinations.
  - The Belfast and South Eastern health trusts have urged off duty staff to come into work amid pressure on hospitals caused by COVID admissions.
- 26 July –
  - The Executive agrees to the reopening of theatres and concert venues from 6pm on 27 July.
  - People attending the forthcoming CHSq and Belsonic music events in Belfast will be required to provide proof of vaccination, COVID antibodies or a negative test, organisers of the events have announced.
  - Northern Ireland records another day without any COVID related deaths, while 639 new cases are recorded.
  - Chief Nursing Officer Charlotte McArdle reports a "significant increased demand" for intensive care beds due to cases of COVID-19 during the preceding weekend.
- 27 July –
  - Chief Medical Officer Sir Michael McBride says the health service is operating under "huge pressures" as growing COVID admissions lead to the cancellation of more surgery.
  - Belfast's Lyric Theatre becomes the first theatre to reopen, an hour and a half after restrictions on theatres and concert venues are lifted. The first play to be staged following the reopening is a performance of Dracula.
  - Health Minister Robin Swann says he will look at whether to link the high street voucher scheme to full vaccination, meaning people could not cash the vouchers without being fully vaccinated.
  - Former Education Minister Peter Weir calls for all children over the age of twelve to be vaccinated, arguing it could cut community transmission and school absences.
- 28 July –
  - Belfast Health and Social Care Trust is forced to cancel some cancer surgery due to COVID-19 pressures, but is working to reschedule the operations.
  - The Women's Policy Group Northern Ireland accuses the Northern Ireland Executive of neglecting the needs of women during the pandemic, and urges ministers to work towards providing better help for women, including better childcare facilities and equality in the workplace.
- 29 July –
  - People attending the Féile an Phobail in Falls Park from 6 to 15 August will be required to provide proof of COVID status, organisers have said.
  - Economy Minister Gordon Lyons confirms Northern Ireland's high street voucher scheme will begin in September. Every adult living in Northern Ireland will become eligible for a £100 card which they can spend in the high street. The scheme is hoped to help towards retail sector recovery following the pandemic.
  - Dr Chris Hagan, medical director of Belfast Health Trust has cited the cancellation of cancer operations as a direct result of people not being vaccinated.
  - Statistics produced by Nisra indicate people's welfare has returned to pre-pandemic levels.
- 30 July – The Department of Health says that "frantic" efforts are under way to resolve security concerns with Northern Ireland's COVID-19 certificate system. The system has been down since Tuesday 27 July amid concerns about data security.
- 31 July –
  - Northern Ireland's COVID passport system is up and running again, but only available to people travelling abroad on Sunday 1 August and Monday 2 August. This is in order to help prevent undue pressure on the system.
  - This date marks the final day on which people can receive a first vaccination from one of Northern Ireland's mass vaccination centres. From 1 August they will only be open for those booking a second vaccination. The change is to allow some of the health staff redeployed to the vaccination centres to return to their regular jobs.

=== August 2021 ===
- 1 August – Northern Ireland's COVID vaccine passport scheme is extended to anyone wishing to travel on Tuesday 3 August.
- 2 August –
  - Dr Eddie O'Neill, head of Northern Ireland's vaccine certificate programme, reports the scheme is going well and that 300 fraudulant applications for certificates have been rejected.
  - The Royal College of Surgeons says that the cancellation of cancer surgery in Northern Ireland at the end of July due to rising COVID cases could have been avoided, and that plans it devised to prevent the situation were not implemented.
  - Kidney transplants have been cancelled in Belfast due to staff shortages.
- 3 August –
  - Kidney charities in Northern Ireland have said they are "devastated" after Belfast Health Trust cancelled several transplant operations over the preceding weekend; a shortage of staff due to the rise of COVID cases is blamed.
  - The number of people waiting for more than twelve hours at an Emergency Department increased fivefold during 2020 compared to five years earlier.
  - As the Electoral Office for Northern Ireland updates its electoral register, it is confirmed that people on the old register will still be eligible to claim the £100 high street vouchers when the scheme is launched.
- 4 August – Northern Ireland's health trusts have been tightening visiting rules as pressure on hospitals grows, it is reported.
- 5 August –
  - Figures from the Department of Health show that hospital procedures have reduced by 46%, with 59,762 cases across all of the health trusts in 2020–21, compared with 110,605 in 2019–20.
  - Eddie Lynch, Northern Ireland's Commissioner for Older People, urges more care home staff to get vaccinated.
- 6 August –
  - The number of COVID related deaths in Northern Ireland passes 3,000 after 18 deaths were registered in the week up to 30 July, taking the total to 3,015. They include a person under the age of 15.
  - The first teenagers aged 16 and 17 have received their first COVID vaccinations.
- 7 August – Figures have shown COVID cases have risen significantly during July, with Northern Ireland having the highest COVID infection rate in the UK. But the present surge is not as bad as the previous one.
- 9 August – Professor Ian Young, Northern Ireland's Chief Scientific Adviser, says there has been a "dramatic reduction" in the number of people testing positive for COVID being admitted to hospital, showing that vaccination reduces the risk of hospitalisation. Of the 1,000 or so COVID cases in Northern Ireland, 22 people are in hospital, down from 60 in December 2020.
- 11 August – The Department of Health says that discussions are under way about sharing data between the UK's vaccination programmes after a student who received his first vaccination in England was told he is ineligible for a COVID passport because he did not receive both jabs in Northern Ireland.
- 12 August – Ministers agree to changes to COVID rules that will end the requirement for self-isolation of close contacts who have been fully vaccinated, as well as the scrapping of school bubbles and the rule of six. But requirements for face coverings and social distancing remain, while post-primary pupils will still need to wear face coverings.
- 13 August – Medics warn it is inevitable that more operations will be cancelled as COVID continues to place pressure on the health service.
- 14 August –
  - The first of a series of walk-in vaccination clinics for new and expectant mothers is held by the Western Health Trust.
  - The Apprentice Boys of Derry hold their annual Relief of Derry parade in the city, though the event is scaled back due to COVID.
- 15 August – Doctors in Northern Ireland have urged visitors to hospitals and clinics to wear face coverings.
- 16 August – Organisers of the annual Féile an Phobail event in west Belfast have described 2021 as its most successful year, with its largest attendance ever, encompassing 250 events over ten days, including three with over 10,000 attendees.
- 18 August – Official figures show that during the period from April to June 2021, house prices in Northern Ireland were 9% higher than the same time in 2020, the largest rise since 2007 and the largest quarterly rise since 2016.
- 19 August –
  - With 86% of Northern Ireland's adult population having received at least one COVID vaccine, Health Minister Robin Swann sets a target of 90%, saying it could halve the number of people in hospital.
  - Ulster University is to ask all of its staff and students whether they have received a COVID vaccine.
- 20 August – Northern Ireland records its highest number of daily COVID cases since the start of the pandemic, with 2,397 new cases reported.
- 21 August –
  - Walk in vaccination centres are open again for anyone over 18 to get their first COVID vaccine in what is dubbed the Big Jab Weekend.
  - The latest health figures show that Northern Ireland has the highest COVID infection and death rate in the UK, and the lowest vaccination rate.
- 22 August – Early estimates suggest more than 8,000 first COVID vaccinations have been given during Northern Ireland's Big Jab Weekend.
- 23 August – Figures from the Department of Health show 12,194 people received their first vaccination during the Big Jab Weekend.
- 25 August – Stormont's economy committee sets 12 September as the launch date for Northern Ireland's High Street voucher scheme.
- 26 August – With half of patients waiting for a first consultation having waited for longer than a year, Health Minister Robin Swann apologises for the length of waiting lists in Northern Ireland.
- 28 August –
  - A report produced by health professionals at Queen's University Belfast highlights what it describes as a "surge" in children's health problems expected to result from the COVID crisis, including effects on their mental health.
  - The Royal Black Institution holds its Last Saturday parades for the first time since 2019, with 17,000 marchers and bandsmen taking part.
- 29 August – Patients are urged to not attend Hospital Emergency Departments unless it is urgent as hospitals are placed under pressure because of COVID patients.
- 30 August – Hospital emergency departments continue to urge patients to stay away unless they have a medical emergency as COVID continues to place the health service under pressure.
- 31 August – Deputy First Minister Michelle O'Neill confirms she is self-isolating after testing positive for COVID-19.

=== September 2021 ===
- 3 September – Education Minister Michelle McIlveen announces a £5.5m package for schools to help with the increased financial pressure of COVID-19 and contact-tracing.
- 6 September –
  - The UK government unveils a new Health and Social Care Tax to help address the patient backlog and shortfalls in social care provisions. Northern Ireland will receive an extra £400m per year from the tax, but plans for its introduction are criticised by parties in Northern Ireland as "inequitable" and "regressive".
  - Around 400 pupils at Larne High School, roughly half of those attending the school, are absent from classes because they have been in close contact with someone who tested positive for COVID.
- 7 September – The Northern Ireland Executive agrees a number of rule changes to take effect from 5pm on Friday 10 September. They include raising the number of people allowed to gather in an indoor domestic setting from 10 to 15, the removal of table service requirements from indoor and outdoor settings, and the removal of the requirement for pre-booked tickets and seat reservations for events. People will also be allowed to play pool, darts and gaming machines in hospitality settings, while dancing will also be allowed at weddings and civil partnership receptions.
- 8 September –
  - BBC News reports the Public Health Agency is to take over responsibility for contact-tracing in Northern Ireland's schools.
  - Health Minister Robin Swann announces plans for "Jabbathon", an initiative to vaccinate university students on campus.
- 9 September – Stormont is recalled to discuss levels of COVID-related school absences.
- 10 September – In a detailed letter to school staff, pupils and their parents, Chief Medical Officer, Professor Dr Michael McBride says that schools are safe for pupils and teachers.
- 11 September – A pop-up vaccination centre is opened at the Limelight music venue in Belfast. Those getting their COVID vaccine there are being given free tickets for a concert at Ormeau Park.
- 12 September – The Belfast Health Trust appeals for off-duty nurses to come into work as its hospitals struggle to cope with an influx of patients.
- 13 September – Walk-in vaccination centres are established at 60 university and further education college campuses across Northern Ireland in a bid to get more students vaccinated against COVID.
- 14 September – Details of the £145m High Street Voucher Scheme are revealed, with registration for the scheme opening on 27 September, and the first vouchers expected to be issued on 4 October.
- 16 September – The Northern Ireland Executive has asked the Ministry of Defence for military medics to be deployed to hospitals in Northern Ireland in October.
- 17 September – The Department of Health announces a widening of the criteria for flu jabs over the coming winter when flu and COVID will be circulating in the population.
- 18 September –
  - Plans are announced to change the traffic lights system for travellers from 4 October, with countries being classed as red or non-red from that date, but unlike England, no changes to the rules regarding tests will be made.
  - The Department of Health is reported to be considering whether to give saliva COVID tests to children with special needs who attend mainstream schools. Presently children at special needs schools are allowed to take the tests.
- 19 September – Professor Siobhán O'Neill, Professor of Mental Health Services at Ulster University, warns that "misinformation" is creating a "real dilemma" for young people considering whether or not to have the COVID vaccine.
- 21 September – Deputy First Minister Michelle O'Neill warns Northern Ireland's health service is "about to topple over" and faces a "difficult winter" if urgent action is not taken.
- 22 September – Health Minister Robin Swann confirms plans for the establishment of elective surgery hubs to ensure operations can be carried out safely over the coming winter.
- 23 September – The Northern Ireland Executive agrees 14 October as the next date to ease COVID restrictions, but this will be subject to a review on 7 October.
- 24 September – The Northern Ireland Executive announces changes to COVID testing for returning international travellers, bringing it into line with the rest of the UK.
- 26 September – After SDLP leader Colum Eastwood calls for the introduction of vaccine passports, Infrastructure Minister Nichola Mallon says she has raised the issue with the Executive on a number of occasions, describing it as a "no brainer".
- 27 September –
  - The Northern Ireland Executive agrees to end social distancing restrictions for shops, theatres and a number of other indoor settings in Northern Ireland from 6pm on 30 September.
  - The website for Northern Ireland's high street voucher scheme opens, and receives 500,000 requests for applications on its first day, but is dogged by problems due to the level of demand.
- 28 September – In a letter to the Executive, Health Minister Robin Swann vents his frustration at delays to the introduction of COVID passports, saying it has "significantly limited" the options for easing COVID rules.
- 30 September –
  - At 6pm, social distancing restrictions for shops, theatres and a number of other indoor settings come to an end in Northern Ireland. Instead some indoor venues are asked to voluntarily introduce rules such as proof of double vaccination or a negative lateral flow test.
  - Northern Ireland residents who hold an Irish passport and who were vaccinated in Northern Ireland become eligible for the EU Digital Covid Certificate.

=== October 2021 ===
- 1 October – Two wards are closed at the Ulster Hospital in Dundonald following COVID outbreaks.
- 2 October –
  - The Department of Health confirms people who are immunosuppressed will be notified shortly about receiving a third COVID vaccine.
  - Bus and Coach NI, the body representing private bus and coach companies in Northern Ireland, warns operators are at risk of collapse following the COVID crisis.
- 3 October – Around 5,700 people take part in the 2021 Belfast Marathon, the first to take place in the city since 2019.
- 6 October – As the temporary £20 increase in Universal Credit comes to an end, the Department of Communities submits a £55m bid to Stormont to offset the drop.
- 7 October – The Northern Ireland Executive agrees to scrap the requirement for social distancing in bars and restaurants from 31 October, meaning nightclubs will be allowed to reopen from that date.
- 9 October – It is confirmed that homeless people and asylum seekers will be eligible to apply for the £100 high street voucher scheme through "trusted partners".
- 15 October – The Department of Health announces a £5.5m fund to support GP services in Northern Ireland over the coming winter.
- 17 October – Infrastructure Minister Nichola Mallon expresses concern for her staff after her office was targeted by anti-vaccine protesters earlier in the week. Her comments come in the wake of the murder of Conservative MP David Amess in Southend, England.
- 19 October – First Minister Paul Givan outlies the Northern Ireland Executive's Winter COVID Contingency Plan; measures include the continued legal requirement for face coverings to be worn in indoor settings throughout the autumn and winter, and the provision for the introduction of COVID passports in "high risk settings" if cases continue to rise.
- 20 October – The rules for care home visits are relaxed to allow four people from no more than two separate households to visit each patient, with four such visits allowed per week.
- 21 October –
  - Following its latest meeting on COVID rules, the Stormont Executive confirms the latest raft of changes that will be effective from the end of October. Social distancing requirements in hospitality sector businesses will become advisory rather than compulsory, while masks will not be a requirement in nightclubs.
  - Dr Tom Black, chair of the Northern Ireland branch of the British Medical Association, warns the health service is facing "its worst winter ever".
- 22 October – Health Minister Robin Swann warns that Northern Ireland is "facing into the most difficult winter ever experienced".
- 23 October – Health Minister Robin Swann warns that the relaxation of COVID rules for the hospitality sector could be reversed if they lead to a surge in cases.
- 25 October –
  - Health Minister Robin Swann urges the Executive to further invest in the health service, warning Northern Ireland cannot rely on military help as a "permanent fixture".
  - The High Street voucher scheme closes at midnight; 500,000 vouchers have been issued to date with a further 900,000 expected to be issued in the coming week.
- 28 October – Finance Minister Conor Murphy says he does not anticipate another winter lockdown for Northern Ireland over the coming winter.
- 29 October –
  - A reallocation of money exercise by the Department of Finance means the Department of Health will get an extra £200m in the coming year.
  - BBC News reports that plans for a dedicated service for people with Long COVID, scheduled to be on stream by the end of October, have been delayed by the Department of Health.
- 31 October – Nightclubs in Northern Ireland are reopened as some remaining COVID restrictions are lifted; Northern Ireland is the last part of the UK to reopen its night time venues.

=== November 2021 ===
- 1 November – Northern Ireland's Department of Health launches the Cert Check NI app to facilitate the "voluntary use" of vaccine checks in the entertainment and hospitality sector.
- 2 November –
  - After several medical professionals argue in favour of a scheme in which patients would be able to ask if a member of medical staff had been vaccinated, Health Minister Robin Swann says he would "not be comfortable" with the idea.
  - The time that people have to spend their Spend Local vouchers is extended from 30 November to 14 December.
- 4 November – Dr Seamus O'Reilly, medical director of the Northern Health Trust, warns that an emergency department may have to close over the winter, but Health Minister Robin Swann says winter closures are not inevitable.
- 7 November – Health Minister Robin Swann initiates legal proceedings against Sir Van Morrison over the latter's description of him as "very dangerous" for his handling of the COVID pandemic.
- 9 November –
  - Health Minister Robin Swann announces plans for a public consultation over whether to introduce mandatory COVID vaccines for healthcare workers in Northern Ireland.
  - A YouGov survey of 1,000 adults in Northern Ireland found that only 3% wanted to return fulltime to the office following the pandemic.
- 14 November – Craigavon Area Hospital begins diverting ambulances away from its emergency department except for life-threatening cases as the hospital reaches full capacity.
- 15 November – As the Northern Ireland Executive prepares to discuss the prospect of introducing COVID passports, Health Minister Robin Swann says "now is the time" for a phased introduction of a COVID passport scheme.
- 16 November –
  - The Public Health Agency has linked more than 170 COVID cases to an entertainment venue in Toome, County Antrim, where a teenage disco was staged. The Agency received complaints about the disco which was described as being dangerously overcrowded.
  - A man in his forties is arrested and charged over threats to kill Health Minister Robin Swann.
- 17 November – Northern Ireland's ministers vote to introduce mandatory COVID passports for Northern Ireland from December, which will need to be produced for entry into pubs, restaurants and nightclubs.
- 18 November –
  - Health Minister Robin Swann announces plans to accelerate the vaccine booster programme, as well as the uptake of first vaccines, with measures such as increasing the number of pharmacy walk-in clinics and more health trust vaccination hubs.
  - BBC News reported that a document produced by Health Minister Robin Swann and circulated to ministers recommends that remote workers during the first lockdown should be remote working again, and that advice issued on 23 September to begin a gradual return to the office should be reversed.
  - The Democratic Unionist Party describes Northern Ireland's COVID passport plan as a "distraction dish" served by ministers that will not relieve the pressures on hospitals.
- 20 November – A protest is held at Stormont to highlight the ongoing difficulties being experienced by care home residents subject to COVID restrictions in a bid to urge Health Minister Robin Swann to ensure regulations are implemented evenly throughout the sector.
- 21 November – Justice Minister Naomi Long describes plans drawn up in a government document to give her department responsibility for raising the compliance level of wearing face coverings to at least 80% as "highly inappropriate".
- 22 November – Health Minister Robin Swann suggests there is a possibility hospitality venues could be asked to close over Christmas if COVID cases continue to rise.
- 23 November – The Northern Ireland Executive announced it is "strengthening" its advice to people in Northern Ireland to remote work whenever possible as a way of mitigating rising COVID infections. People were also advised to limit their social contact and to wear face coverings if meeting up indoors.
- 24 November –
  - Eddie Lynch, Northern Ireland's Commissioner for Older People, called for a Northern Ireland-based inquiry into the handling of care home residents during the pandemic.
  - People in Northern Ireland are urged by hospital staff to behave responsibly and "save Christmas" as emergency departments come under heavy pressure.
- 26 November – Unlicensed premises such as coffee shops and cafes will not have to enforce vaccine passports when the scheme launches on Monday 29 November, it is confirmed.
- 29 November –
  - First Minister Paul Givan describes Northern Ireland's COVID passport scheme as "divisive", rushed, and says it should not go ahead.
  - Data from the Office for National Statistics suggests Northern Ireland's economy grew by 1.08% in the third quarter of 2021, and that it is the part of the UK to have had the strongest bounce back after lockdown.
- 30 November –
  - A series of booster vaccination clinics have opened across Northern Ireland following recommendations that all adults over the age of 18 should receive a booster vaccine.
  - Justin McCamphill of the NASUWT teaching union urges the early closure of schools for the Christmas holidays as a "circuit breaker"; the union also says some pupils have switched to remote learning because there are not enough teaching staff to cover classes.

=== December 2021 ===
- 3 December – As the Irish Republic reintroduces some COVID restrictions over Christmas, including the closure of nightclubs and limiting the number of people who can meet up indoors, Northern Ireland's deputy first minister, Michelle O'Neill says there are no plans to increase the level of restrictions for Northern Ireland over the festive period.
- 4 December – The annual Lundy Parade is held in Derry, the first full event since 2019.
- 6 December –
  - The Department of Education says there are no plans to close schools early for the Christmas holiday or switch to remote learning.
  - A Stormont Committee hears from a Hospitality Ulster representative that workers within the sector have been subject to abuse by people objecting to being asked for a COVID pass.
- 7 December –
  - The first case of the Omicron variant is identified in Northern Ireland, and is believed to be linked to travel from the UK mainland.
  - Stormont follows Westminster by tightening rules to require travellers arriving from abroad to take a pre-departure COVID test, with the rules coming into force from 4am.
- 8 December – First Minister Paul Givan says Stormont should not go into "panic mode" over the Omicron COVID variant.
- 9 December –
  - The deadline to spend the £100 High Street vouchers is extended until midnight on Sunday 19 December.
  - Chief Medical Officer Sir Michael McBride says some restrictions may need to be reintroduced in January.
- 13 December – COVID Passes become enforceable for hospitality businesses in Northern Ireland, with a £10,000 fine for any venue that does not comply.
- 14 December – Northern Ireland follows England in removing all 11 Southern African countries from the travel red list.
- 15 December – The number of Omicron variant cases reaches 151; Chief Medical Officer Sir Michael McBride says he is more concerned now than at any other time of the pandemic.
- 16 December –
  - There are not 210 Omicron cases in Northern Ireland, but ministers have warned of the potential for 11,000 cases per day.
  - In a letter to HM Treasury, Finance Minister Conor Murphy calls for the furlough scheme to be reinstated and for more financial support for Stormont as Northern Ireland is affected by COVID.
  - Belfast's Titanic Exhibition Centre is to open as a vaccination centre, it is confirmed.
- 17 December – New guidelines require close contacts of anyone testing positive for COVID to self-isolate again, even if fully vaccinated, and get a PCR test.
- 19 December –
  - The booster programme is opened to all adults over the age of 18.
  - Northern Ireland is to receive an extra £75m from the Treasury to help deal with COVID.
- 20 December –
  - A total of 2,349 Omicron cases have been identified in Northern Ireland, with 1,068 in the most recent day's data.
  - Queen's University Belfast announces plans to return to remote learning in January 2022.
- 21 December – Health Minister Robin Swann says that as many as two thirds of those aged under 50 who are in hospital with COVID are unvaccinated.
- 22 December – BBC News reports that planning for staff absenteeism is ne of the biggest concerns facing the health service in Northern Ireland this winter.
- 23 December –
  - The Stormont Executive agrees a £40m package to support hospitality sector businesses affected by the latest round of COVID restrictions.
  - Health Minister Robin Swann announces the rollout of the COVID treatments molnupiravir and neutralising monoclonal antibodies (nMABs), which are used to treat high risk patents m declaring it a “significant milestone in our battle against Covid-19”.
  - The Department of Health puts out a call for retired teachers to return to the classroom in order to allow the continuation of face-to-face teaching.
- 24 December – A further 3,286 COVID cases are recorded for Northern Ireland, the largest daily increase so far.
- 26 December – Nightclubs close again barely two months after reopening, ahead of further restrictions to be introduced the following day.
- 27 December – A limit of six on the number of people who can meet up indoors, the return of table service for the hospitality sector and two metre social distancing are reintroduced in Northern Ireland.
- 29 December – Changes to testing rules are brought in due to a high demand for PCR tests. Fully vaccinated people who are exposed to COVID are now advised to take a daily lateral flow test for ten days and only book a PCR test if they test positive, whole unvaccinated people must self-isolate for ten days.
- 30 December – First Minister Paul Givan confirms the time required to self-isolate following a positive COVID test will be reduced from ten to seven days from New Year's Eve, describing the decision to do so as one taken to avoid a "workforce crisis".
- 31 December – The Belfast Health Trust places further restrictions on visiting due to COVID, with immediate effect. Patients are limited to one visitor for the entire duration of their hospital or care home stay, while the visitor must undergo a risk assessment. Visitors are also prohibited if they are experiencing COVID-like symptoms.

== See also ==
- Timeline of the COVID-19 pandemic in Northern Ireland (2020)
- Timeline of the COVID-19 pandemic in Northern Ireland (2022)
- Timeline of the COVID-19 pandemic in the Republic of Ireland (January–June 2021)
- Timeline of the COVID-19 pandemic in the Republic of Ireland (July–December 2021)
- Timeline of the COVID-19 pandemic in the United Kingdom (January–June 2021)
- Timeline of the COVID-19 pandemic in the United Kingdom (July–December 2021)
- Timeline of the COVID-19 pandemic in England (2021)
- Timeline of the COVID-19 pandemic in Scotland (2021)
- Timeline of the COVID-19 pandemic in Wales (2021)
- History of the COVID-19 pandemic in the United Kingdom
