= Timeline of the COVID-19 pandemic in Northern Ireland =

Timeline of the COVID-19 pandemic in Northern Ireland may refer to:

- Timeline of the COVID-19 pandemic in Northern Ireland (2020)
- Timeline of the COVID-19 pandemic in Northern Ireland (2021)
- Timeline of the COVID-19 pandemic in Northern Ireland (2022)
