= Timeline of the COVID-19 pandemic in Northern Ireland (2020) =

Daily Northern Irish events related to the 2020 pandemic

The following is a timeline of the COVID-19 pandemic in Northern Ireland during 2020. There are significant differences in the legislation and the reporting between the countries of the UK: England, Scotland, Northern Ireland, and Wales.

== Timeline ==
=== February 2020 ===
- 27 February – Authorities confirm the first case of coronavirus in Northern Ireland.

=== March 2020 ===
- 18 March – The Northern Ireland Assembly reduces its workload by suspending all non-essential Assembly business. It is closed to the public from the following day.
- 19 March – The first COVID-19 death is confirmed in Northern Ireland.
- 23 March – With the UK death toll hitting 335 deaths and 3 in Northern Ireland, Boris Johnson announces a nationwide 'Stay at Home' order which will come into effect as of midnight and will be reviewed every 3 weeks. This becomes known as the UK lockdown.
- 28 March – At 11pm, new regulations come into force in Northern Ireland giving authorities the power to force businesses to close, and impose fines on them if they refuse, as well as on people leaving their homes without a "reasonable excuse". The measures, introduced by the Northern Ireland Executive, bring Northern Ireland into line with the rest of the UK.

=== April 2020 ===
- 6 April – The Grand Orange Lodge of Ireland of the Orange Institution announces that the traditional Twelfth of July parades in Northern Ireland have been cancelled for 2020.
- 7 April – *The Northern Ireland Assembly establishes a COVID-19 Response Committees.
- 11 April – Occupancy of critical care beds in England peaks at around 58% of capacity. Occupancy in the month of April for Scotland and Wales will only briefly exceed 40%, while Northern Ireland reported a peak of 51% early in the month.
- 15 April – Arlene Foster, the First Minister of Northern Ireland, extends the period of lockdown in Northern Ireland to 9 May.
- 24 April –
  - UK Transport Secretary Grant Shapps announces bilateral discussions with the Irish and French governments to safeguard freight routes, and with the Northern Ireland Executive regarding support for passenger flights. Funding is to be provided to support ferry routes to Northern Ireland, the Isle of Wight and the Isles of Scilly.
  - The Northern Ireland Executive agrees to reopen cemeteries in Northern Ireland following public pressure; they had been closed since March.

=== May 2020 ===
- 10 May – The UK government updates its coronavirus message from "stay at home, protect the NHS, save lives" to "stay alert, control the virus, save lives". The Opposition Labour Party expresses concern the slogan could be confusing, and leaders of the devolved governments in Scotland, Wales and Northern Ireland say they will keep the original slogan.
- 12 May – The Northern Ireland Executive publishes a five-stage plan for exiting lockdown. Unlike those announced in England and the Republic of Ireland, the plans do not include any dates when steps may be taken.
- 14 May – Northern Ireland First Minister Arlene Foster announces the first steps for easing the lockdown in Northern Ireland, with garden centres and recycling centres allowed to reopen from Monday 18 May. Marriage ceremonies where a person is terminally ill will also be allowed.
- 19 May – Northern Ireland further eases its lockdown measures. Groups of up to six people who do not share the same household are allowed to meet up outdoors, so long as they maintain social distancing. Churches are allowed to reopen for private prayer, and the playing of sports such as golf and tennis can resume.
- 21 May – Northern Ireland Education Minister Peter Weir outlines plans for schools to reopen in Northern Ireland in August, with a phased return for students.
- 26 May –
  - For the first day since 18 March, no new COVID deaths are reported in Northern Ireland. Robin Swann, the Northern Ireland Health Minister, describes it as "a clear sign of progress".
  - The Northern Ireland Executive agrees to further relax lockdown restrictions from 8 June, when large retailers, car showrooms and shops in retail parks will be allowed to open, and outdoor weddings attended by ten people will be permitted.
- 31 May – The Northern Ireland Executive agrees to ease the lockdown measures for people shielding at home from 8 June, when they will be allowed outdoors with members of their household, or to meet one member of another household if they are living alone.

=== June 2020 ===
- 4 June – Debenhams announces plans to reopen three stores in Northern Ireland from 8 June, followed by 50 in England a week later.
- 7 June – No new deaths are recorded for Scotland or Northern Ireland over the most recent 24 hour period; it is the first time Scotland has recorded no new deaths since lockdown began in March.
- 11 June – The Northern Ireland Executive meets to agree the easing of a number of lockdown measures, including allowing the reopening of small shops and shopping centres from the following day, and letting those who live alone form a bubble with members of one other household from Saturday 13 June.
- 12 June – Non-essential retailers reopen in Northern Ireland.
- 13 June – Parts of the Health Protection (Coronavirus, Restrictions) (England) (Amendment No. 4) Regulations 2020 (SI 588) come into effect. In England and Northern Ireland, households with one adult may now become linked with one other household of any size, allowing them to be treated as one for the purpose of permitted gatherings. This also allows the members of one household to stay overnight at the home of the other. The government refers to this as a "support bubble". The rules on gatherings are also relaxed to allow medical appointments and births to be accompanied, and to permit some visits to people in hospital, hospices and care homes.
- 15 June – Diane Dodds, Northern Ireland's Economy Minister, announces that bars, restaurants and cafes in Northern Ireland can reopen from 3 July.
- 18 June – The Northern Ireland Executive agrees to reduce social distancing at schools from 2 metres to 1 metre, with a target date for schools to return on 24 August. Non-urgent dental treatment will resume in Northern Ireland from 29 June, and hairdressers, barbers and beauty salons can reopen from 6 July.
- 19 June – Northern Ireland Education Minister Peter Weir confirms the Northern Ireland Executive have agreed to extend the country's free meals scheme to cover the summer holidays.
- 20 June – *Northern Ireland records one death in the most recent 24 hour period, but no new cases of COVID-19 for the first time since March.
- 21 June – No new COVID-19 deaths are recorded for Scotland and Northern Ireland.
- 22 June – The Northern Ireland Executive agrees to allow up to six people to meet up indoors from the following day.
- 25 June – The Northern Ireland Executive agrees to reduce social distancing from two metres to one metre from 29 June, as well as a raft of other lockdown easing measures for Northern Ireland. These include reopening betting shops on 3 July, reopening of close contact services such as spas and tattoo parlours on 6 July, reopening indoor gyms and playgrounds from 10 July, reopening libraries from 16 July, resuming competitive sport from 17 July, reopening bingo halls and arcades, theatres and cinemas from 29 July, and reopening indoor sports facilities, leisure centres, skating rinks and soft play areas from 7 August. In addition, indoor spectators at sporting events will be allowed from 28 August, and open air museums can reopen from late August.

=== July 2020 ===
- 1 July – Northern Ireland's Department of Health says that a contact-tracing app will be ready for Northern Ireland by the end of July.
- 2 July –
  - Northern Ireland's First Minister Arlene Foster calls on Michelle O'Neill to resign following her attendance at the funeral of Bobby Storey. Foster says she cannot "stand beside" O'Neill and "give out public health advice" after she attended the gathering of 120, breaking Northern Ireland government restrictions that say no more than 30 should attend a funeral.
  - The Northern Ireland Executive announces that the wearing of face coverings will be compulsory on public transport in Northern Ireland from 10 July. Exceptions will be for those with a medical condition, children under the age of 13, and on school transport.
- 3 July –
  - The UK government published a list of 59 countries for which quarantine will not apply when arriving back in England as from 10 July. They include Greece, France, Belgium and Spain, but Portugal and the United States are among those not on the list. These changes do not apply to Scotland, Wales or Northern Ireland, where quarantine restrictions remain in place for all arrivals from outside the UK.
  - Hotels, bars, restaurants and cafes permitted to reopen in Northern Ireland.
  - Northern Ireland's deputy First Minister Michelle O'Neill apologised after complaints about her attendance of a funeral a few days earlier.
- 6 July –
  - As concerns about increasing unemployment grow, the UK government announces a £111m scheme to help firms in England provide an extra 30,000 trainee places; £21m will be provided to fund similar schemes in Scotland, Wales and Northern Ireland.
  - Northern Ireland relaxes visiting rules for hospitals and care homes, while birth partners are allowed to attend maternity appointments again. Close contact businesses, including hairdressers and tattoo parlours are also reopened.
  - The Northern Ireland Executive also announces that indoor weddings and baptisms will be allowed from 10 July.
- 9 July – Northern Ireland lifts quarantine regulations on arrivals from 50 countries, including France, Italy, Germany and Spain, effective from 10 July.
- 13 July – A survey by Ulster Bank finds that the economy of Northern Ireland continued to shrink in June, but at a slower rate than in previous months.
- 14 July –
  - With a condensed season of Gaelic football set to begin on the upcoming weekend, the Gaelic Athletics Association's COVID Advisory Group agrees to keep indoor facilities, such as dressing rooms and gyms, closed until further notice.
  - As England announces that face coverings will become mandatory in shops from 24 July, Northern Ireland's Infrastructure Minister Nichola Mallon says she supports the introduction of the same measure for Northern Ireland.
- 15 July – The Northern Ireland Statistics and Research Agency (NISRA) publishes a postcode breakdown of COVID-19 deaths in Northern Ireland; the data indicates the BT4 area of East Belfast, including parts of the Upper Newtownards Road, Holywood Road and Sydenham to have had to largest number of deaths at 36.
- 16 July – Contact-tracing is under way after Northern Ireland's Public Health Agency identifies a cluster of COVID-19 cases linked to a social gathering in the Limavady area.
- 18 July – Research conducted by Ulster University indicates that an estimated 240,000 to 280,000 jobs could be at risk under two metre social distancing regulations, and that reducing it to one metre could save up to 30,000 jobs.
- 20 July – Routine dental care is allowed to resume, but dentists warn that a shortage of personal protective equipment (PPE) means not all practices can reopen in Northern Ireland.
- 21 July – The Democratic Unionist Party rejects a suggestion from Sinn Féin that travellers from Great Britain to Northern Ireland should quarantine for 14 days as a means of preventing the spread of COVID-19. DUP MP Sir Jeffrey Donaldson describes the idea as a "non-starter".
- 22 July – The Public Health Agency says it has identified 16 clusters of COVID-19 involving 133 cases since its contact-tracing system began operating.
- 23 July –
  - The Northern Ireland Executive gives the go-ahead for swimming pools, spas and community centres to reopen from the following day, and announces that face coverings must be worn in shops from 20 August. The Executive also agrees to request urgent talks with the UK and Irish governments over travel arrangements.
  - The Department of Health confirms the release of Northern Ireland's contact-tracing app, StopCOVID NI, for as early as 29 July. Northern Ireland is the first part of the UK to launch a contact-tracing app.
- 24 July – Swimming pools, spas and community centres are allowed to reopen.
- 26 July – Quarantine restrictions are reimposed on travellers arriving from Spain following a spike of COVID-19 cases in Spain.
- 30 July – Northern Ireland's contact tracing app StopCOVID NI is launched.
- 31 July –
  - The shielding programme for Northern Ireland is paused.
  - Figures from the Northern Ireland Statistics and Research Agency indicate COVID-19 was mentioned on seven death certificates in the week ending 24 July, five more than the previous week.

=== August 2020 ===
- 2 August – Figures released by the Health and Safety Executive show that 336 complaints were made about companies regarding breaches of COVID-19 regulations between 5 May to 17 July.
- 5 August – The number of COVID-19 cases in Northern Ireland passes 6,000 after ten new cases bring the total to 6,006.
- 6 August – The latest round of rule changes are announced by the Northern Ireland Executive, with the wearing of face coverings becoming compulsory in shops and other enclosed spaces from 10 August. Pubs serving food are allowed to open from the same day, though pubs that do not serve food must remain closed. Pupils will be able to return to school full-time from the beginning of the autumn term.
- 7 August –
  - Weekly statistics released by the Northern Ireland Statistics and Research Agency indicate one COVID-19 related death for the week ending 31 July.
  - Professor Ian Young, the chief scientific adviser for Northern Ireland, says that face coverings would be "of some benefit" to older school pupils.
- 8 August –
  - Queen's University Belfast announces it will make face coverings compulsory for staff and students in some areas of its campus from Monday 10 August.
  - The annual Apprentice Boys of Derry march takes place in Derry, but on a reduced scale due to the COVID-19 pandemic.
- 10 August –
  - The wearing of face coverings becomes compulsory in shops and other enclosed places.
  - Ulster Bank's monthly survey of economic activity in Northern Ireland indicates the economy is recovering following the pandemic, but that employment is falling, with the service sector the most impacted.
- 11 August – Health Minister Robin Swann expresses concern at the "increasing number" of COVID-19 cases after a rise of 194 cases in the last seven days, 48 of them in the last 24 hours.
- 12 August –
  - As another 29 COVID-19 cases are recorded for Northern Ireland, health minister Robin Swann warns Northern Ireland is facing one of the most dangerous points of the pandemic, and expresses concern that some people have stopped following COVID guidelines.
  - Figures published by the Business Services Organisation (BSO) show that more than 170 million pieces of personal protective equipment (PPE) were delivered to the health service in Northern Ireland during the first five months of the pandemic.
- 13 August –
  - A Level results are published. In Northern Ireland 37% of estimated grades were lowered, while 5.3% were raised.
  - Schools in Northern Ireland are issued with reopening guidelines, with the wearing of face coverings optional and advice that social distancing "may be relaxed in the presence of other mitigations" such as hygiene measures.
- 15 August – The Department of Health begins issuing weekend COVID updates again, having stopped doing so earlier in the summer. The figures show a further 65 new cases in Northern Ireland.
- 17 August –
  - Education minister Peter Weir announces that A Level and GCSE results will be based on teachers' assessment following controversy over grades.
  - Northern Ireland's chief scientific adviser, Professor Ian Young, expresses concern at the rising number of COVID cases in Northern Ireland and suggests local measures may be required to curtail the increase.
- 18 August – The Northern Ireland Executive holds its first COVID-19 press briefing for six weeks, where Health Minister Robin Swann warns that lockdown measures may be reimposed amid a rise in cases.
- 19 August – The heads of Northern Ireland's four main churches – the Church of Ireland, Methodist Church, Catholic Church and Presbyterian Church – ask their parishioners to wear face coverings during services, describing it as their responsibility "to ensure that our services of worship are safe places".
- 20 August –
  - The Northern Ireland Executive tightens restrictions on the number of people who can meet following an increase in COVID-19 cases. The number of people who can meet outdoors is reduced from 30 to 15, while indoor gatherings are reduced from ten people to six people from two separate households.
  - Health minister Robin Swann says the Police Service of Northern Ireland will focus its enforcement of COVID-19 rules on "hotspot areas" with high cases of the virus.
  - A meat processing plant in County Antrim closes for a deep clean after 35 people test positive for COVID-19.
  - GCSE results are published, with grades now based on teachers' assessments; 37% of grades awarded are rated A* or A, compared with just under a third in 2019.
- 22 August – Police stations in Antrim and Newtownabbey are closed for a deep clean after eight officers test positive for COVID-19.
- 24 August – Schools reopen for the autumn term, with students in years Seven, Twelve and Fourteen the first to return.
- 25 August – Education Minister Peter Weir announces that school pupils will be required to wear face coverings in corridors and other communal areas from Monday 31 August.
- 26 August – The Northern Ireland Executive delays the reopening of theatres and pubs that do not serve food, postponing the 1 September date due to an increase in transmission of the virus.
- 28 August – The number of COVID-19 cases in Northern Ireland passes 7,000 after the Department of Health reports 85 new daily cases, bringing the total to 7,049.
- 29 August –
  - A further 89 COVID cases are reported over the most recent 24 hour period.
  - The usual parades held by the Royal Black Institution to mark the last Saturday of August are not held in 2020 because of the COVID-19 pandemic.
- 31 August – As face coverings become recommended for secondary schools in Northern Ireland, Justin McCamphill from the NASUWT calls for them to be made mandatory.

=== September 2020 ===
- 1 September –
  - Almost all schools in Northern Ireland fully reopen to pupils for the first time since March.
  - The Driver and Vehicle Agency expands the number of MoT tests, and driving tests, having resumed some activity in August.
  - An outbreak of COVID is detected at Craigavon Area Hospital.
- 2 September – Following a hearing at the High Court, the AQE and PPTC primary school transfer exams will be delayed from November 2020 to January 2021. A previous Department of Education decision to delay the exams by two weeks was challenged by lawyers representing two pupils due to sit the exams amid concerns they would be disadvantaged by the time lost in school to prepare for the tests.
- 3 September – Finance Minister Conor Murphy writes to the Treasury to ask for the furlough scheme to be extended beyond the end of October.
- 4 September – Two further COVID deaths are recorded over the most recent 48 hours, both at Craigavon Area Hospital.
- 7 September – The Department of Education describes as "regrettable" an erroneous email sent to schools in Northern Ireland by the Department of Health and Social Care that addressed them as care homes and informed them they were to receive ten COVID home testing kits by 20:00 BST on 7 September.
- 8 September –
  - Shane Devlin, chief executive of the Southern Health Trust apologises following the death of a fourth COVID patient at Craigavon Area Hospital.
  - The Northern Ireland Executive says that it has not received a response from the Treasury regarding its request to extend the furlough scheme, and warns Northern Ireland could not afford another lockdown.
- 9 September –
  - Figures released by the Department of Education show that COVID-19 cases have been reported at 64 Northern Ireland schools in the first two weeks of the autumn term.
  - The Duke of Cambridge meets emergency workers in Belfast during a visit to Northern Ireland.
- 10 September –
  - The Northern Ireland Executive imposes new restrictions on visiting homes for Ballymena, and parts of Glenavy, Lisburn and Crumlin, following a rise in COVID-19 cases in those areas. From the following week people living in those areas are limited to social gatherings of six, and are encouraged not to travel outside the areas.
  - Speaking during a government briefing, deputy First Minister Michelle O'Neill acknowledges that her attendance at a funeral during the pandemic undermined the government's health message.
- 11 September –
  - Following criticism of changes to restrictions introduced by the Northern Ireland Executive, Dr Michael McBride, Northern Ireland's chief medical officer, urges the public to "use their good judgement" when considering the restrictions.
  - The Southern Health Trust suspends visits to patients in all of its hospitals following the COVID-19 deaths at Craigavon Area Hospital.
  - Queen's University Belfast provides places for a further 80 medical students after funding for the places is agreed by the Northern Ireland Executive.
- 15 September – Unemployment figures show that almost one in ten young people in Northern Ireland are unemployed; those claiming unemployment-related benefits rising by 800 to 62,700 in August.
- 16 September –
  - Local COVID-19 restrictions are made enforceable by law.
  - Northern Ireland's universities say they will discipline any students who breach COVID-19 public health guidelines.
- 17 September –
  - The Northern Ireland Executive gives drink only pubs the go ahead to reopen from Wednesday 23 September, but restrictions on home visits are to be imposed from 18 September in parts of County Armagh.
  - Official figures show that COVID-19 deaths were the second most common deaths in Northern Ireland between 1 April and 30 June, with 4,684 deaths registered during that time, 732 of them COVID related.
- 18 September –
  - Health Minister Robin Swann describes three new songs by Sir Van Morrison that protest against COVID-19 restrictions as "dangerous". One of the songs "No More Lockdowns" talks about scientists making up "crooked facts" to "enslave" people.
  - A further five hospital deaths are recorded in Northern Ireland, two at Craigavon Area Hospital and three at Daisy Hill Hospital.
- 20 September –
  - Colm Gildernew, chair of Stormont's health committee, says there are "areas of grave concern" within Northern Ireland's COVID-19 testing system.
  - It is announced that David Cook, who in 1978 became the first non-unionist Lord Mayor of Belfast in more than a century, has died after being diagnosed with COVID-19.
- 21 September – The Northern Ireland Executive announces the extension of COVID-19 restrictions to all of Northern Ireland from 18:00 BST on 22 September; from then households are prevented from mixing while groups of no more than six are allowed to meet.
- 22 September – In a televised address, the first and deputy First Ministers, Arlene Foster and Michelle O'Neill call for a "big push" to curb the number of COVID-19 cases in Northern Ireland, describing new measures as not a second lockdown, but a wake-up call.
- 23 September –
  - Health Minister Robin Swann says that COVID-19 is "gaining momentum" again in Northern Ireland and there is a "narrow window" to suppress it, while Chief Medical Officer Michael McBride warns there could be as many as 500 cases a day by October if rules are ignored.
  - the Northern Ireland Ambulance Service confirms that ten members of its staff have tested positive for COVID-19.
- 24 September –
  - First Minister Arlene Foster says that the Northern Ireland Executive has not yet reached a decision over pub curfews in Northern Ireland.
  - The Northern Ireland Executive agrees a funding package to support the arts in Northern Ireland.
  - After pictures emerge of Democratic Unionist Party MP Sammy Wilson on a London tube without a face covering, Wilson says he accepts he "should have been" wearing a face covering and will "accept whatever consequences there are".
- 25 September –
  - A further 273 cases of COVID-19 are confirmed in Northern Ireland, taking the total number of people diagnosed with the virus past 10,000 to 10,223.
  - Dr Michael McBride and Dr Ronan Glynn, the respective chief medical officers for Northern Ireland and the Irish Republic, advise against all but essential travel across the Northern Ireland–Donegal border.
  - The Department of Education says it will issue new guidelines to schools regarding when pupils should self-isolate if one of their classmates is diagnosed with COVID-19. The announcement comes a day after advice was updated to say all pupils in a support bubble should be sent home in such a situation.
- 26 September –
  - Northern Ireland records its highest daily cases of COVID-19 with a further 319 cases, bringing the total to 10,542.
  - Hospitality Ulster says it is "seeking clarity" from the Northern Ireland Executive over new COVID-19 regulations for its sector.
- 27 September – Professor Charlotte McCardle, Northern Ireland's Chief Nursing Officer, says that restrictions for birth partners will not be lifted any time in the near future.
- 28 September –
  - SDLP leader Colum Eastwood says there is an urgent "need to act quickly" over the number of cases in the Derry and Strabane areas, which are three times higher than Northern Ireland as a whole.
  - Some students in halls of residence at Queen's University Belfast are told to self-isolate after a small number test positive for COVID-19.
- 29 September –
  - The Northern Ireland Executive announces that bars, pubs and restaurants must close at 11pm; the rules come into force from midnight on 30 September.
  - As a further 320 COVID cases are confirmed, Chief Scientific Adviser Professor Ian Young predicts that Northern Ireland could see 1,000 cases a day by the end of October.
  - After First Minister Arlene Foster holds talks with US special envoy Mick Mulvaney, the Northern Ireland says that a Northern Ireland–United States relationship will be "hugely important" in helping to rebuild the economy post-COVID.
- 30 September – Health Minister Robin Swann says that Northern Ireland is at a "crossroads" in dealing with the COVID-19 pandemic, and more measures are required to curb it.

=== October 2020 ===
- 1 October –
  - Fresh restrictions are announced for Derry and Strabane, with pubs, cafes, restaurants and hotels permitted only to offer takeaway and delivery services, as well as outdoor dining. Derry's Altnagelvin Hospital also suspends some services to deal with COVID patients. Derry and Strabane have the highest COVID rates in Northern Ireland.
  - Hospitality businesses call for evidence to be produced showing the cause of the rise in COVID cases in Derry and Strabane, and urge a cautious approach when introducing new restrictions.
- 2 October –
  - A further 934 cases of COVID-19 are recorded, the highest daily total so far for Northern Ireland.
  - Prime Minister Boris Johnson announces extra financial support for the Northern Ireland Executive to help deal with a second wave of COVID-19.
  - A sixth person dies from COVID-19 at Daisy Hill Hospital in Newry following an outbreak of COVID there.
  - Democratic Unionist Party MP Jim Shannon is required to self-isolate at home after coming into contact with Scottish National Party MP Margaret Ferrier, who breached COVID-19 rules after experiencing symptoms and subsequently testing positive for the virus.
- 3 October – A further 726 COVID-19 cases are confirmed in Northern Ireland, along with one death.
- 4 October – Finance Minister Conor Murphy tells the BBC's Sunday Politics programme that Stormont may consider further COVID-19 restrictions if the current measures do not prove to be effective.
- 5 October – First Minister Arlene Foster and deputy First Minister Michelle O'Neill speak to Cabinet Office Minister Michael Gove about the prospect of extra financial support from Westminster in the event of another lockdown. Foster subsequently says that such an event is avoidable if people adhere to the rules, but that Northern Ireland would need extra financial help in the event of such an occurrence.
- 6 October –
  - Deputy First Minister Michelle O'Neill says that further COVID restrictions will be discussed at a forthcoming meeting of the Northern Ireland Executive on 8 October.
  - Police and the Northern Health and Social Care Trust launch a joint investigation into a care home amid concerns about breaches of COVID regulations.
- 7 October –
  - Ulster Rugby suspends training after a team member and an academy player test positive for COVID-19.
  - Economy Minister Diane Dodds that a "circuit breaker" lockdown will only work for Northern Ireland with Treasury support.
  - As a further 828 COVID-19 cases are confirmed, Health Minister Robin Swann expresses concern that too many people are ignoring COVID restrictions.
- 8 October –
  - Prime Minister Boris Johnson and Taoiseach Micheál Martin discuss Northern Ireland's rising number of COVID-19 cases in a phone call, and agree to monitor the situation.
  - Deputy First Minister Michelle O'Neill says that she and First Minister Arlene Foster have asked for urgent talks with Boris Johnson due to cases rising "at an alarming rate".
  - Figures compiled by the BBC for the week ending 4 October indicate Derry City and Strabane has the highest COVID-19 infection rate in the UK, with 582 cases per 100,000.
- 9 October –
  - The Northern Ireland Executive introduces new offences for breaching coronavirus regulations: failing to close a business as required; breaching early closing times; and failing to implement the required social distancing. There will also be a new minimum fine of £200 instead of £60.
  - A further 1,080 COVID-19 cases are recorded, the highest daily total to date.
  - Deputy First Minister Michelle O'Neill self-isolates after a relative tests positive for COVID-19.
- 10 October –
  - A further 902 COVID-19 cases are recorded.
  - Deputy First Minister Michelle O'Neill tests negative for the virus, but says she will continue to self-isolate.
- 11 October – Communities Minister Carál Ní Chuilín tests negative for COVID-19, but says she will self-isolate after several members of her family test positive.
- 13 October – More than 100 elective surgeries have been cancelled in Belfast because of COVID-19.
- 14 October –
  - Fresh restrictions are announced for Northern Ireland, affecting schools and the hospitality sector. Hospitality businesses will be limited to a takeaway only service for four weeks from Friday 16 October, while schools will close for two weeks from Monday 19 October.
  - Belfast's Nightingale hospital is re-established amid growing COVID-19 cases.
- 15 October – The Northern Ireland Executive announces that firms forced to close because of tighter COVID restrictions will receive additional financial support.
- 16 October –
  - Pubs and restaurants close as Northern Ireland begins a month of tighter restrictions.
  - Agriculture Minister Edwin Poots says he has "grave concerns" about new restrictions, and that he and his Democratic Unionist Party colleagues are in a "minority" opposed to them.
  - There is confusion over whether fans can attend elite sporting events following different advice from First Minister Arlene Foster and Minister for Communities Carál Ní Chuilín. A letter from Ní Chuilín to sporting bodies says attendance is not permitted under new restrictions, but Foster subsequently publishes a Twitter post saying that sporting events are not covered by the rules.
- 17 October – Minister for Communities Carál Ní Chuilín says that sporting events should take place behind closed doors, even though rules state that a limited number of spectators can attend.
- 18 October –
  - An anti-lockdown protest involving more than 300 people is held outside Stormont; several arrests are made.
  - Four prison officers at Hydebank Wood Prison test positive for COVID-19.
  - Education Minister Peter Weir says that public debate is needed over Northern Ireland's lockdown restrictions, and defends comments made by Edwin Poots, saying "people have a right to express their opinions".
- 19 October –
  - Education Minister Peter Weir confirms that almost 1,500 COVID-19 cases have been confirmed in schools since their return in August.
  - Flu vaccinations for under-65s are paused until fresh stocks are received, following a "phenomenal" demand for flu injections.
- 20 October –
  - The Department of Health publishes the evidence it has used to inform its decision making over its response to the COVID-19 crisis, including an Executive paper on the effects of measures taken on travel, education and personal contacts.
  - Health officials say there is "strong evidence" COVID restrictions imposed on the Derry City and Strabane area is beginning to have the desired effect of reducing the number of cases in the area.
- 21 October –
  - Health Minister Robin Swann is self-isolating after receiving a close proximity notice from Northern Ireland's track and trace app.
  - After Northern Ireland's lockdown evidence is criticised as "flimsy" and "shocking", Swann says that not to act on the evidence would have been a "total abdication of responsibility".
- 22 October –
  - First Minister Arlene Foster says that contact tracing in Northern Ireland needs to be "scaled up" in order to tackle the spread of COVID-19.
  - The Northern Ireland Executive announces that free school meals will be provided to children during the October half-term break.
  - The Executive also agrees to provide financial support for tradespeople who are unable to access COVID support funds, generally those who do not work from a premises, such as mobile hairdressers and driving instructors.
- 23 October –
  - Health officials launch an investigation into whether a brand of hand sanitiser used by Health and Social Care is affected by a safety recall in the Irish Republic.
  - Deputy First Minister Michell O'Neill says that Northern Ireland needs a COVID-19 strategy that does not involve a "cycle of lockdowns".
  - Health Minister Robin Swann says he is "deeply concerned" about the postponement of cancer procedures.
- 24 October – BBC News reports that a funding package for the taxi, private bus and coach sectors is to be brought forward "urgently".
- 25 October –
  - A COVID outbreak is reported among staff and patients on a ward at the Ulster Hospital in Dundonald.
  - Belfast Health and Social Care Trust reports that the waiting list for spinal surgery for children with conditions like scoliosis has grown during the COVID crisis, and will continue to grow through the second wave, with some children having waited a year or more for surgery.
- 26 October – People are asked not to attend Antrim Area Hospital because it is "operating beyond capacity" with 27 ill patients waiting to be admitted.
- 28 October – Northern Ireland records its youngest COVID-related death, that of a 19-year-old male.
- 29 October –
  - Finance Minister Conor Murphy announces a funding package worth £560m for the health service to tackle COVID-19.
  - Elisha McCallion, the former MP for Foyle, resigns from her role as a Sinn Féin member of the Seanad, as well as from her role in the Upper Bann constituency, after failing to return money given out by a Stormont emergency COVID fund to which she was not entitled.
- 30 October – Health Minister Robin Swann warns that any hope of a return to normality at the end of Northern Ireland's four weeks of tighter restrictions are "entirely misplaced".
- 31 October – Catherine Kelly, an MLA for West Tyrone resigns over the failure to repay COVID emergency funding that was wrongly given out by Soormont.

=== November 2020 ===
- 1 November – Following the UK government's announcement that the furlough scheme will be extended until December to cover the period of England's month-long lockdown, Finance Minister Conor Murphy calls for it to be extended beyond then.
- 2 November – Schools in Northern Ireland are told to hold physical education classes outside with no more than fifteen pupils.
- 3 November –
  - Following the previous day's advice to schools regarding PE lessons, Education Minister Peter Weir announces they will be able to hold PE indoors or outdoors without limits on numbers following a legal change in regulations.
  - BBC News NI reports that health trusts across Northern Ireland are getting close to significantly reducing the number of routine operations.
- 4 November –
  - Declan Kearney, Sinn Féin's junior minister in the Executive, says interventions to tackle COVID-19 "have not achieved enough" to ensure further restrictions are not needed.
  - Craigavon Area Hospital cancels elective surgery.
- 5 November –
  - First Minister Arlene Foster announces that Northern Ireland's restrictions have helped to gain "important ground" with the R number dropping to around 0.7.
  - The Irish Football Association announces that 1,060 spectators will be permitted to attend Northern Ireland's Euro 2020 play-off with Slovakia at Belfast's Windsor Park stadium.
  - Northern Ireland's contact-tracing app, StopCovidNI, has been downloaded more than half a million times, with 22,500 people told to self-isolate by it.
- 6 November –
  - The number of COVID deaths in Northern Ireland surpasses 1,000, standing at 1,053.
  - Deputy First Minister Michelle O'Neill calls for the UK and Ireland to be aligned on their strategy for dealing with COVID-19.
  - Health officials have said the number of COVID-19 cases in the north west is plateauing.
- 7 November –
  - Food bank usage in County Londonderry and Belfast has increased significantly because of the COVID-19 pandemic.
  - St Joseph's Boys' School, Derry is closed until 23 November after several positive cases of COVID-19 at the school; its 700 students will be taught remotely until then.
- 10 November –
  - The Democratic Unionist Party vetoes proposals from Health Minister Robin Swann to extend Northern Ireland's lockdown restrictions by two weeks until 27 November; they will consequently expire at midnight on Thursday 12 November.
  - Figures released by the Police Service of Northern Ireland indicate cases of domestic violence and abuse are at a fifteen year high because of the COVID crisis. A total of 32,000 cases were reported to PSNI between June and July 2020.
  - Education Minister Peter Weir announces that GCSE, AS and A Level examinations will go ahead in summer 2021.
  - The Department of Health estimates Northern Ireland will receive around 570,000 doses of the new COVID-19 vaccine if it is licensed.
- 11 November – Police in Belfast issue 40 fines for breach of COVID rules after breaking up two parties at the same address in the same evening.
- 12 November –
  - Stormont votes to extend lockdown restrictions for a week, until Friday 20 November, after which close contact services including hair and beauty salons and driving instructors can reopen by appointment.
  - Three of Northern Ireland's five health trusts have cancelled planned elective surgery during the preceding week.
- 13 November –
  - First Minister Arlene Foster says that she regrets how the Executive handled the decision to extend COVID restrictions in Northern Ireland.
  - Health Minister Robin Swann says that hospitals will not turn away COVID patients, but warns that other patients may have to wait for treatment.
  - Belfast International Airport announces it will close for several hours on some days as a result of the COVID crisis.
  - Ireland's Taoiseach, Micheál Martin warns that COVID-19 cases in Northern Ireland are "worryingly high" and says he is "glad" the Executive has agreed to extend lockdown restrictions.
- 15 November – Health Minister Robin Swann expresses fears he may need to ask for further COVID restrictions by the end of the year.
- 16 November – Deputy First Minister Michelle O'Neill says the Northern Ireland Executive will do what it can to "protect" as much as Christmas as possible.
- 17 November – Education Minister Peter Weir says there are "no plans" to extend the Christmas school holidays in Northern Ireland.
- 18 November – Health Minister Robin Swann announces that he will bring proposals to the Northern Ireland Executive setting out ways to deal with COVID.
- 19 November – The Northern Ireland Executive agrees to impose a two-week circuit breaker lockdown from Friday 27 November, meaning restrictions will be slightly eased for a week from 20 November. Close contact services will be able to reopen for a week before being forced to close again, but hospitality sector businesses will remain closed. Schools will stay open during the renewed circuit breaker.
- 20 November –
  - As restrictions are eased for a week, First Minister Arlene Foster denies that the DUP performed a U-turn over its decision to support further lockdown measures after voting against them a week earlier, and says the evidence to support the measures had changed during that time.
  - DUP minister Edwin Poots states his opposition to the renewed lockdown measures in a letter to more than 80 people, which was in reply to a member of the public's question about the measures.
  - Deputy First Minister Michelle O'Neill agrees to participate in a police investigation into the funeral of senior IRA figure Bobby Storey.
- 23 November – The Northern Ireland Executive agrees a package of financial measures to support people affected by lockdown restrictions.
- 24 November –
  - Plans for COVID measures over Christmas are announced by the First and deputy First Ministers, with up to three households allowed to meet up indoors and outdoors from 23 to 27 December, in line with the rest of the UK. But unlike the UK's other constituent countries, restrictions will be relaxed in Northern Ireland from 22 to 28 December to accommodate those travelling to and from the UK mainland, though they will not be allowed to meet up on those extra days.
  - Chief Medical Officer Michael McBride has said pubs and restaurants may be able to reopen before Christmas, but only if they adhere to COVID safety rules.
- 25 November –
  - Presenting his Spending Review to the House of Commons, Chancellor Rishi Sunak announces that Northern Ireland will get an extra £920m for public services during 2021.
  - Health Minister Robin Swann urges people to "unite" and follow new lockdown rules in order to make Christmas more enjoyable.
- 26 November –
  - Health Minister Robin Swann announces that plans are under way for Northern Ireland's COVID-19 vaccination programme to begin in December.
  - Deputy First Minister Michelle O'Neill urges people to limit their contacts before Christmas.
- 28 November – GPs in Northern Ireland are planning to begin COVID vaccinations of people aged over 80 and not living in care homes from 4 January 2021.
- 29 November –
  - Steve Aiken, leader of the Ulster Unionist Party, says that a mass vaccination programme will require the support of the Northern Ireland Executive.
  - The Police Service of Northern Ireland says that 45 COVID-19 notices and 10 community resolution notices have been issued overnight relating to three house parties in Belfast.
- 30 November –
  - Staff at Belfast Health Trust are to be offered the Pfizer vaccine should it be approved, BBC News reports.
  - Education Minister Peter Weir dismisses speculation that schools will close early for Christmas.

=== December 2020 ===
- 1 December – The number of COVID-related deaths in Northern Ireland passes 1,000 as a further 15 cases take the total to 1,011.
- 2 December – Following the UK's approval of the Pfizer/BioNTech vaccine, BBC News reports the first vaccinations in Northern Ireland could be given as early as 9 December.
- 3 December –
  - The Northern Ireland Executive announces that non-essential retail and some parts of the hospitality sector can reopen from 11 December, though bars, restaurants and hotels will be required to close at 11pm.
  - Patricia Donnelly, who has responsibility for Northern Ireland's COVID vaccination programme, outlined the timetable for delivery to the Northern Ireland Assembly Health Committee, suggesting a COVID vaccine may become part of routine immunisation from 2022.
- 4 December –
  - The first doses of the Pfizer/BioNTech vaccine arrive in Northern Ireland, ready for distribution the following week.
  - More than 500 sixth-form pupils at Methodist College Belfast will be taught from home for the rest of the term after 35 positive COVID tests at the school.
- 5 December – An animated Christmas lights show in Lisburn is suspended after the number of people it attracts is deemed to be a COVID-19 risk.
- 8 December – Twenty-five men and women from Palmerston residential home in east Belfast become the first care home residents in Northern Ireland to receive the Pfizer/BioNTech COVID vaccine, while Joanna Sloan, a 28-year-old nurse from Belfast, becomes the first health worker to receive the vaccine.
- 9 December –
  - Speaking to the Northern Ireland Assembly, Education Minister Peter Weir says he will not cancel GCSE, AS and A Level exams in 2021.
  - Lisnagarvey High School in Lisburn becomes the first school in Northern Ireland to move almost entirely to remote teaching for the rest of the term following a COVID outbreak.
- 10 December – As Northern Ireland nears the end of its latest lockdown, ministers urge people not to "get caught up in the Christmas spirit" and to behave sensibly.
- 11 December –
  - Non-essential retailers, and restaurants, cafes and other venues serving food are permitted to reopen as Northern Ireland's latest lockdown ends.
  - Health Minister Robin Swann warns that further restrictions are "inevitable" in the New Year, but their severity will depend on how people act over the coming weeks.
- 12 December – Dentists in Northern Ireland express their concern about the impact of COVID-19 on people's oral health as fewer dental checks may lead to serious problems not being identified soon enough to provide effective treatment.
- 13 December – Further supplies of the Pfizer/BioNTech vaccine arrive in Northern Ireland, bringing the number to 50,000 doses.
- 14 December – In a joint statement, the chief executives of Northern Ireland's six health trusts, have warned hospitals face being overwhelmed in the event of a COVID spike after Christmas, and that "several of Northern Ireland's acute hospitals are already operating beyond capacity".
- 15 December – Antrim Area Hospital reports a queue of ambulances outside its accident and emergency department as it struggles to deal with COVID patients, with doctors treating patients in the ambulances.
- 16 December – As the Northern Ireland Executive prepares to consider "robust interventions" to deal with COVID-19, Health Minister Robin Swann says the threat of coronavirus will hang over Christmas and "cast a shadow well into January".
- 17 December –
  - The Northern Ireland Executive agrees to commence another lockdown from 26 December that could potentially last for six weeks. Non-essential shops and contact services will close from Christmas Eve, with hospitality businesses limited to offering takeaway services; essential shops will be forced to close by 8pm from 26 December to 2 January. The measures will be reviewed after four weeks.
  - Representatives of the business community have warned the new lockdown will be disastrous for many business and lead to their demise.
- 18 December –
  - Education Minister Peter Weir announces that schools and other education establishments in Northern Ireland will open as normal during the first week of January.
  - Professor Ian Young, Northern Ireland's chief scientific adviser, says that without a six-week post-Christmas lockdown, the impact on deaths and hospitalisations of COVID will be "severe".
- 19 December – Deputy First Minister Michelle O'Neill says the situation is being kept under review after the UK government tightens Christmas rules in mainland UK. Her comments come after she and First Minister Arlene Foster meet with health minister Robin Swann and senior health officials to discuss the situation.
- 20 December – The Northern Ireland Executive meets to discuss the new variant of COVID-19 and what to do about Christmas. The decision is made to limit Christmas bubbles to Christmas Day.
- 21 December –
  - The Northern Ireland Executive votes against proposals to introduce a travel ban between Northern Ireland and the UK mainland.
  - Education Minister Peter Weir outlines plans for the return of schools in January, with some secondary education moving online for two weeks from 25 January.
- 22 December – Sinn Féin have called for an all-Ireland ban on freight arriving from the UK because of the new variant of COVID-19.
- 23 December –
  - Health Minister Robin Swann announces that suspected cases of the new variant of COVID-19 have been discovered patients in Northern Ireland.
  - Swann also announces that the stay at home message during the forthcoming lockdown will be made "legally enforceable".
- 24 December – Professor Ian Young, Northern Ireland's chief scientific adviser, warns that the new variant of COVID-19 could have "substantial consequences" if it becomes dominant.
- 26 December – Northern Ireland goes into a six-week lockdown after rules were briefly relaxed for Christmas Day.
- 28 December – Health Minister Robin Swann urges people to stay at home over the New Year, and that New Year's Eve parties could turn into "super spreader" events.
- 29 December – As a further 1,566 COVID cases are reported, the highest daily total so far, Health Minister Robin Swann says there has been a "significant rise" in Northern Ireland's cases, particularly in adults between 20 and 39, who account for 41.5% of those testing positive for the virus.
- 30 December –
  - Northern Ireland records its highest daily number of COVID cases with 2,143 cases reported in the preceding 24 hours.
  - BBC News reports that the return of secondary school pupils following the Christmas break is likely to be delayed.
- 31 December –
  - Northern Ireland schools will have a phased return through January, with primary school pupils being taught remotely until 11 January, and some secondary pupils in years Eight, Nine, Ten and Eleven not returning to the classroom until the end of January.
  - The Northern Ireland Ambulance Service warns of "lengthy delays" for non-urgent patients as 160 of its employees are absent due to COVID-19.

== See also ==
- Timeline of the COVID-19 pandemic in the United Kingdom (January–June 2020)
- Timeline of the COVID-19 pandemic in the United Kingdom (July–December 2020)
- Timeline of the COVID-19 pandemic in the United Kingdom (2021)
- Timeline of the COVID-19 pandemic in England (2020)
- Timeline of the COVID-19 pandemic in Scotland (2020)
- Timeline of the COVID-19 pandemic in Wales (2020)
- Timeline of the COVID-19 pandemic in Northern Ireland (2021)
