= Shine (nightclub) =

Nightclub in Belfast, Northern Ireland

- Interactive map of Shine
- Coordinates: 54.585°N 5.937°W
- Owner: Alan Simms; Phil Donaldson
- Type: Nightclub

Construction
- Opened: 1995

Website
- www.shine.net

Shine is a club night located in Belfast, Northern Ireland. The club was started in 1993 by local DJ Alan Simms, first as A Different Drum at the Limelight before moving to the Mandela hall, part of Queen's University Students' Union, where it became Shine in 1995.

At the clubs peak of popularity in the early 2000s, the entire Students' Union was used over multiple rooms. 'Super Shine' nights brought the clubs capacity to its thousands and hosted several high profile DJs and acts in the one evening.

The club had no formal music policy, but techno was prevalent on most nights. DJs and live acts that have played in Shine include Soulwax, Carl Cox, Green Velvet, David Holmes, Deep Dish, Darren Emerson, Richie Hawtin, Adam Freeland, Deep Dish, Layo and Bushwacka!, Audio Bullys, Felix da House Cat, Welt, Andrew Weatherall, Laurent Garnier, Groove Armada, Vitalic, Slam, Rigsy, Dave Clarke and Fergie. Phil Kieran was a former resident and regular guest at the club. BBC Radio 1 has held events at Shine in the past with Pete Tong and, unusually, Tim Westwood appearing in the main room. Radio 1 DJ Annie Mac worked at the club while attending Queen's. Starting in PR and promotions, working at the club was inspiration to buy her first set of decks. The promoters provided a regular roster of local dj’s too.

In 2006 Shine events became less frequent, operating instead on a monthly schedule.

The club also had a record label called Shine Recordings. The label, founded by Alan Simms, Phil Donaldson and Gary Dillon, released six 12" singles between 2002 and 2006. Releases on the label included tracks by Jon Carter, Simms & Welt and Justin Robertson, who also played the club regularly.

In 2005 Simms & Donaldson opened another club in the city, The Stiff Kitten. The name derives from Joy Division's original name. In November 2009, The Stiff Kitten underwent a name change and is now called 'The Kitten Bar'. The front bar was renovated to increase seating capacity. The Stiff Kitten has since closed from summer 2014.

The final Shine at Mandela Hall took place on Saturday 28 July 2018. The Students Union building containing the Mandela Hall was demolished in 2020.

== See also ==
- Belsonic
- CHSq
