= Alban Maginness =

Northern Irish politician

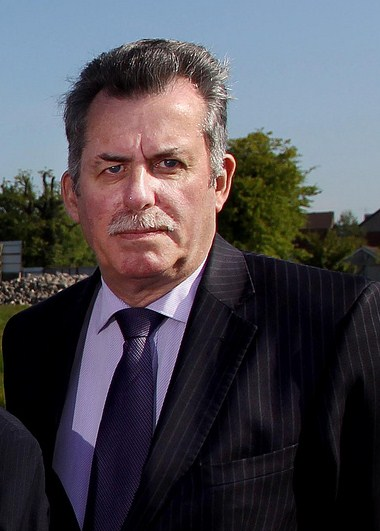

Member of the Northern Ireland Assembly for Belfast North
- In office 25 June 1998 – 30 March 2016
- Preceded by: New Creation
- Succeeded by: Nichola Mallon

42nd Lord Mayor of Belfast
- In office 1997–1998
- Preceded by: Ian Adamson
- Succeeded by: David Alderdice

Member of Belfast City Council
- In office 5 May 2005 – 2010
- Preceded by: Martin Morgan
- Succeeded by: Nichola Mallon
- Constituency: Oldpark
- In office 15 May 1985 – 5 May 2005
- Preceded by: District created
- Succeeded by: Pat Convery
- Constituency: Castle

Personal details
- Born: 9 July 1950 (age 76) Holywood, County Down, Northern Ireland
- Party: SDLP
- Spouse: Carmel Maginness
- Children: 8
- Education: Queen's University Belfast; University of Ulster
- Profession: Barrister
- Website: http://www.albanmaginness.com

Alban Maginness (born 9 July 1950) is a Northern Irish Social Democratic and Labour Party (SDLP) politician who was a Member of the Northern Ireland Assembly (MLA) for Belfast North from 1998 to 2016.

== Early life and education ==
Maginness was born in Holywood, County Down. He completed his grammar school education at St. Malachy's College, Belfast. He then attended the University of Ulster and Queen's University of Belfast where he undertook legal training. He was called to the Bar in 1984.

Whilst at university he became involved in the non-violent protests organised by the Northern Ireland Civil Rights Association. Maginness participated in the famous civil rights march in Derry in 1972 at which British troops killed 14 unarmed civilians. This event, now termed Bloody Sunday, has gone down in Northern Ireland politics as one of the turning points in The Troubles that contributed to the development of the Provisional IRA.

== Political career ==
Maginness became increasingly involved in politics and became a member of the Social Democratic and Labour Party. He stood unsuccessfully for the party in East Belfast in the 1975 Constitutional Convention election and North Belfast in the 1982 Assembly election.

He has been an elected member of Belfast City Council since 1985 and in 1997 he became the first Catholic politician to hold the position of Lord Mayor of Belfast. In 1998 he was elected to the Northern Ireland Assembly to represent Belfast North.

He was Chair of the SDLP from 1984 to 1991.

In November 2008 Maginness had his trademark moustache shaved off for the BBC's Children in Need.

Maginness was the SDLP candidate for the 2009 European Election.

Maginness accused the Secretary of State of interning dissident republican Marian Price without trial, saying "We do not support putting people away in prison because of intelligence or because of some political point of view and we are convinced that she has been detained without trial because of that by the secretary of state."

Having served as an MLA for North Belfast from 1998, Maginness decided not to stand for election in 2016. He was replaced by Nichola Mallon.

Party political offices
Preceded by Sean Farren	Chairman of the Social Democratic and Labour Party; 1984–1990	Succeeded by Mark Durkan
Northern Ireland Forum
New forum	Member for North Belfast; 1996–1998	Forum dissolved
Northern Ireland Assembly
New assembly	MLA for Belfast North; 1998–2016	Succeeded by Nichola Mallon
Civic offices
Preceded by Ian Adamson	Lord Mayor of Belfast; 1997–1998	Succeeded by David Alderdice
