= CHSq =

- Genre: Rock, Dance, Pop, Indie Rock
- Dates: August (2017 – present)
- Locations: Custom House Square, Belfast
- Years active: 2017 – present
- Website: customhousesquare.com

Custom House Square (Stylised as CHSq) is an outdoor music event held in Custom House Square, Belfast. 2017 was the first year of CHSq but events have been held at this venue before such as the Belsonic music festival in 2014. The capacity of this event is 5,000.

The 2022 event is due to include Simple Minds (rescheduled from 2021).

== 2018 ==
CHSq 2018 was announced to return in 2018 with the first headlining act to be Rag’n’Bone Man with support. Eight more headliners were announced in the coming weeks and months along with their supporting acts. Kasabian are to return to CHSq in 2018 after last years concert was cancelled minutes before they were to take to the stage "due to illness".

2018 Line-Up
Year	Day/month	Headline artist	Supporting artists
2018	10 August	George Ezra	Hudson Taylor, Dan Caplen
2018	11 August	Ben Nicky	Jody Wisternoff, Jerome Isma-Ae, Paddy Gormley
2018	18 August	Sasha & John Digweed	Nic Fanciulli, Psycatron
2018	20 August	Kasabian	DMA's
2018	22 August	Travis	Turin Brakes
2018	23 August	Kodaline	Lewis Capaldi, Brand New Friend
2018	24 August	Rag'n'Bone Man	Mullally
2018	25 August	Stiff Little Fingers	The Damned/Buzzcocks, The Defects, Terri Hooley
2018	26 August	Drumcode X Shine	Adam Beyer, Amelie Lens, Enrico Sangiuliano, Schmutz

== 2017 ==
CHSq 2017 was announced in March with acts being added to the line-up every couple of weeks. It was announced via CHSq's social media that the 20 August show with headlining act Oliver Heldens would be cancelled due to "scheduling difficulties", they also announced that another date would be announced for Winter 2017 in due course to make up for the inconveniences caused. Kasabian's concert was cancelled minutes before they were to take to the stage "due to illness", organisers say they are going to reschedule the concert.

2017 Line-Up
Year	Day/month	Headline artist	Supporting artists
2017	11 August	Above & Beyond	Oliver Smith, 16 Bit Lolitas
2017	12 August	Walking on Cars	TBA
2017	16 August	Emeli Sandé	Ray BLK
2017	17 August	Timmy Trumpet	Will Sparks, Joel Fletcher
2017	19 August	Foy Vance	Amy MacDonald, Ryan McMullan, David C Clements
2017	20 August	Oliver Heldens - Cancelled	John Gibbons, Jax Jones
2017	22 August	Kasabian - Cancelled	Blossoms, Touts
2017	25 August	Ocean Colour Scene	The Coral, Carl Barât, The Jackals
2017	26 August	Stiff Little Fingers	The Stranglers, The Ruts DC, The Outcasts, Terri Hooley
2017	27 August	Carl Cox	Hot Since 82, Phil Kieran, Schmutz
