= Michael McBride (doctor) =

Consultant and medical officer from Northern Ireland

Professor Sir Michael McBride

Chief Medical Officer for Northern Ireland
- Incumbent
- Assumed office September 2006
- Preceded by: Henrietta Campbell

Personal details
- Education: Queen's University Belfast (MB BCh BAO)

Professor Sir Michael Oliver McBride is a consultant physician who has served as the Chief Medical Officer for Northern Ireland since September 2006.

== Education ==
McBride attended St. Malachy's College in North Belfast. He then attended Queen's University Belfast, where he graduated with a MB BCh BAO medical degree, with distinction in Medicine and Surgery, in 1986.

== Career ==
In 1991, McBride attained a Research Fellowship at St Mary's Hospital Medical School and Imperial College London, where he conducted research into new drug treatments for HIV. From 1994 to 2006 he worked as an HIV Consultant within the Genitourinary Medicine service at the Royal Group Hospitals Trust. He was appointed medical director of the Royal Group of Hospitals in August 2002.

In September 2006, the Department of Health appointed him as Northern Ireland's Chief Medical officer. He was appointed acting Permanent Secretary of the Department of Health and Chief Executive of NI Health and Social Care between March and August 2009 at the request of the then Minister. In November 2014, at the request of the then Health Minister, he was appointed as Chief Executive of Belfast Health and Social Care Trust, serving until February 2017 while continuing in his role of Chief Medical Officer (CMO). It was noted at the time, that this arrangement whereby someone could hold leadership posts in closely related organisations was "highly unusual".

One of the many issues he has had to deal with during his time as Chief Medical Officer is the COVID-19 pandemic.

== Honors and awards ==
McBride was knighted in the 2021 Birthday Honours for services to public health in Northern Ireland. He was awarded an honorary Professorship in Public Health Practice from Queen's University Belfast in 2021 for services to Public Health.
