= Belsonic =

Outdoor music festival held in Belfast

- Belsonic logo
- Genre: Rock, Dance, Pop, Indie Rock
- Dates: August (2008–2015), June (2016–2020, 2022-2024) September (2021)
- Locations: Custom House Square, Belfast, Northern Ireland (2008–2015) Titanic Belfast (2016), Ormeau Park (2017-present)
- Years active: 2008 – present
- Website: belsonic.com

Belsonic is an annual outdoor music festival held in Belfast during the month of June. The festival, organised by Shine Productions, started in 2008, and when it began was held in Custom House Square in August. The festival later moved to Ormeau Park, and now happens in June, taking place over several weeks. The festival has hosted international acts including Lizzo, Lionel Richie, Shania Twain, Sting, and Blondie.

== History ==
The Belsonic music festival originally took place during the month of August at the Custom House Square in Belfast, Northern Ireland, starting in 2008. It is organised by Shine Productions Ltd. The capacity of the event was 15,000 as of 2019. As of 2022, Belsonic is held in Ormeau Park. The festival partners with charity the Cancer Fund for Children. In 2021 the festival organisers faced criticism for failing to meet with local residents to discuss the impacts on them of the festival. The festival director is Alan Simms.

Belsonic 2020 was cancelled due to COVID-19 with plans to reschedule the event in 2021.The event was due to take place in Ormeau Park from 7 to 28 June.

Belsonic 2023 included acts Florence + The Machine, Charli XCX, Lizzo and Lionel Richie.

In 2024 the festival took place over three weeks in June, with acts including Shania Twain, Sting, Blondie, Take That, Limp Bizkit, Picture This and Scooter. Local acts performed at folk and traditional music event The Farmers' Bash, including Derek Ryan, The Whistlin' Donkeys, The Tumbling Paddies and All Folk'd Up.

The 2025 line-up included Catfish and the Bottlemen, Alanis Morissette and Madness.
