= Nichola Mallon =

Northern Irish politician

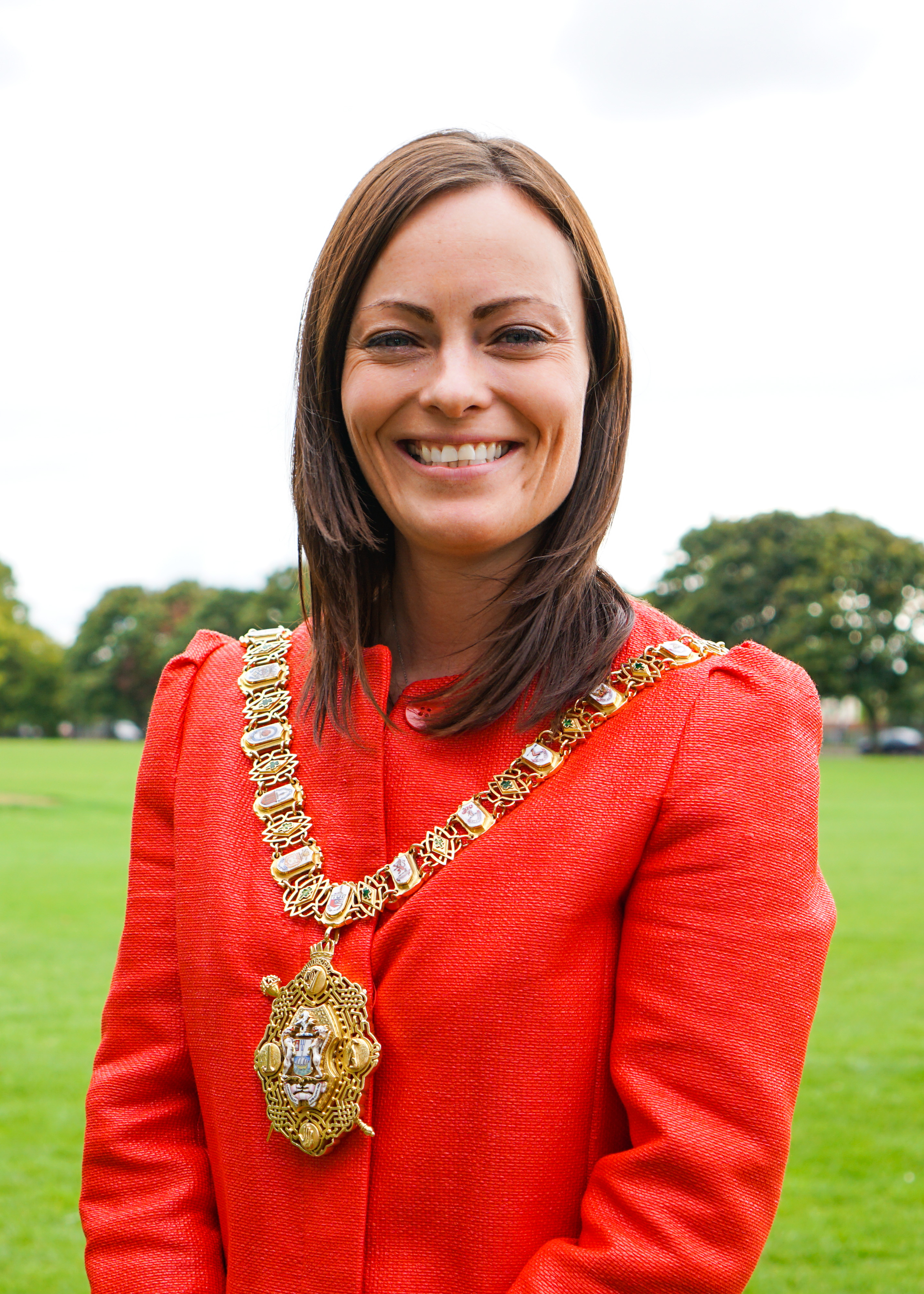
- Mallon as Lord Mayor of Belfast in 2014

Minister of Infrastructure
- In office 11 January 2020 – 5 May 2022
- Preceded by: Chris Hazzard
- Succeeded by: John O'Dowd

Deputy Leader of the Social Democratic and Labour Party
- In office 12 September 2017 – 5 May 2022
- Leader: Colum Eastwood
- Preceded by: Fearghal McKinney
- Succeeded by: vacant

Member of the Northern Ireland Assembly for Belfast North
- In office 5 May 2016 – 28 March 2022
- Preceded by: Alban Maginness
- Succeeded by: Nuala McAllister

71st Lord Mayor of Belfast
- In office 2 June 2014 – 1 April 2015
- Deputy: Máire Hendron
- Preceded by: Máirtín Ó Muilleoir
- Succeeded by: Arder Carson

Member of Belfast City Council
- In office 2010 – 5 May 2016
- Preceded by: Alban Maginness
- Succeeded by: Paul McCusker
- Constituency: Oldpark

Personal details
- Born: 23 August 1979 (age 47) Belfast, Northern Ireland
- Party: Social Democratic and Labour Party
- Spouse: Brendan Scott (m. 2013)
- Children: 3
- Education: Trinity College Dublin; Queen's University Belfast

Nichola Mallon (born 23 August 1979) is a former politician from Northern Ireland who served as Deputy Leader of the Social Democratic and Labour Party (SDLP) from 2017 to 2022. She served as a Member of the Northern Ireland Assembly (MLA) for Belfast North from 2016 to 2022 and as Lord Mayor of Belfast from 2014 to 2015. She was elected as Deputy Leader of the SDLP in 2017. She was appointed Minister for Infrastructure on 11 January 2020, before being removed from office after losing her seat at the 2022 Assembly election.

== Early life and career ==
Nichola Mallon was born in Belfast in 1979. Her father was a printer and her mother was a dress-maker. She grew up in the Ardoyne district of North Belfast. Her family were involved in the trade union movement and she took part in May Day rallies as a girl.

She attended Mercy Primary School followed by St Dominic's Grammar School for Girls, where she developed an interest in politics and was attracted to the SDLP. She read Economics and Politics at Trinity College Dublin and graduated with a BA (Hons), followed by an MA in Comparative Ethnic Conflict from Queen's University Belfast.

When she left university, she joined the civil service before moving to the General Medical Council and then to a job with the SDLP.

== Political career ==
In 2010 she was co-opted by the SDLP onto Belfast City Council to replace Alban Maginness in the Oldpark (District Electoral Area). In 2014, she won the seat in her own right, polling just under 1,000 first preferences. In 2013, she was appointed a special adviser to the SDLP's Environment Minister Mark H. Durkan, but stood down from that position when elected Lord Mayor of Belfast in 2014. She served as the Lord Mayor of Belfast from 2014 to 2015, the first female Irish nationalist politician to hold the position.

She was elected a Member of the Northern Ireland Assembly for Belfast North in 2016 and re-elected in 2017, increasing the SDLP vote to 5,431 first preferences.

On 12 September 2017, Mallon was elected Deputy Leader of the SDLP. She was appointed Minister for Infrastructure on 11 January 2020.

She failed to retain her seat at the 2022 Assembly election.

== Post-political career ==
In December 2022, she started a job at Logistics UK, a trade association which represents the freight industry.

== Personal life ==
Mallon is married to Brendan Scott and has three children, two daughters and a son.

Civic offices
| Preceded by Máirtín Ó Muilleoir | Lord Mayor of Belfast; 2014–2015 | Succeeded by Arder Carson |
Northern Ireland Assembly
| Preceded by Alban Maginness | MLA for Belfast North; 2016–present | Incumbent |
