= Belfast Bikes =

Cycle rental scheme in Belfast, Northern Ireland

Frank and Honest Belfast Bikes
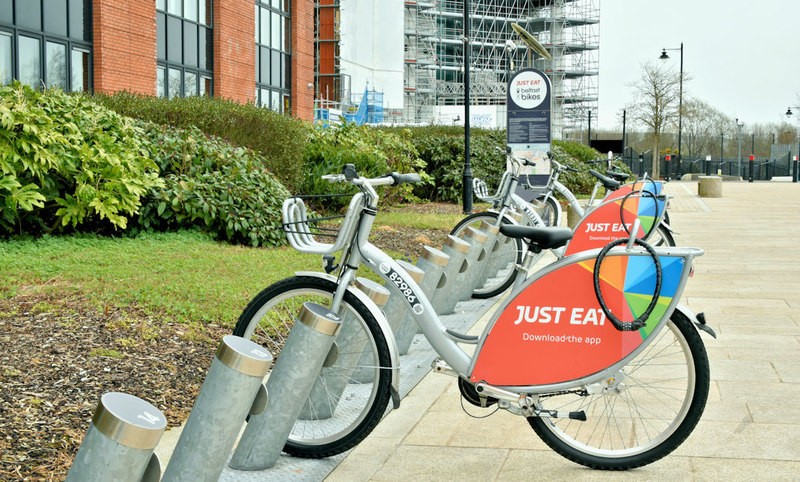
- Belfast Bikes docked at Gasworks (Lagan Towpath) station in 2019

Overview
- Owner: Belfast City Council
- Locale: Belfast, Northern Ireland
- Transit type: Bicycle-sharing system
- Number of stations: 45
- Website: belfastbikes.co.uk

Operation
- Began operation: April 27, 2015; 11 years ago
- Operator: NSL
- Number of vehicles: 632

Belfast Bikes, also known for sponsorship reasons as Frank and Honest Belfast Bikes, is a public bicycle rental scheme which has operated in the city of Belfast since April 27, 2015. At its launch, the scheme, which was then sponsored by Coca-Cola HBC, used 300 Unisex bicycles with 30 stations.

Belfast City Council owns the scheme. The Department for Regional Development (DRD) provided initial capital funding for the scheme as part of their Active Travel Demonstration Projects budget. NSL is looking after the daily operation of the scheme, while Nextbike is responsible for the bikes.

== Expansion and development ==
The system started with 30 stations, the number has increased to 59, and has expanded beyond the city centre area. This includes stations at Queen's University Belfast (the cost of which was covered by the University), one close to the Titanic Belfast Convention Centre, and at the Mater, Royal Victoria and Belfast City Hospitals (the cost covered by the Belfast Health and Social Care Trust). Over recent years, the scheme has expanded into residential areas across the city.

Plans for expansion are ratified by vote by Belfast City Council Strategic Policy and Resources Committee.

== Sponsorship ==
At its launch the scheme was sponsored by Coca-Cola HBC for a three-year period and was known as Coca-Cola Zero Belfast Bikes. In April 2018 this sponsorship deal ended and after a tendering process Just Eat were named as the new sponsors in August 2018 with the scheme to be branded as Just Eat Belfast Bikes. The latest scheme sponsor (June 2024) is Frank and Honest Coffee Company owned by Irish grocery wholesaler Musgrave Group.

== Costs ==
To use the system, users need to take out a subscription, which allows the subscriber an unlimited number of rentals. Subscribers can get an Annual Hire Card costing £25, or a 3-day ticket costing £6. Users also authorise Belfast Bikes to charge £120 from their credit card if the bike is not returned. The first half-hour of every journey is free, after that a service charge applies. There is also a popular pay-as-you go option. See below for pricing structure:

Time	30 min	1 hr	2 hrs	3 hrs	4 hrs
Rate	Free	£0.50	£1.50	£2.50	£3.50

In response to a Freedom of Information request, Belfast City Council published financial figures relating to subsidies to the scheme. In its first year, the Council subsidised it to the tune of £173,000. From April 2016 to April 2017, this increased to £215,000, despite a Business Case showing subsidies would reduce from £56,440 (April 2015 to April 2016), £23,050 (April 2016 - April 2017) and return a profit of £10,730 (April 2017 - April 2018).

== Stations ==
Belfast Bikes docking stations
Name	Bikes	Launch Date
Alfred Street / St Malachy's Church	14	April 27, 2015
Arthur Street / Chichester Street	18	April 27, 2015
Bankmore Square / Dublin Road	16	April 27, 2015
Botanic Avenue / Shaftesbury Square	16	April 27, 2015
Bradbury Place	16	April 27, 2015
Carrick Hill / St Patricks Church	12	April 27, 2015
Castle Place / Royal Avenue	22	April 27, 2015
Cathedral Gardens / York Street	20	April 27, 2015
Central Station / East Bridge Street	20	April 27, 2015
Central Station / Mays Meadow	20	April 27, 2015
City Hall	20	April 27, 2015
College Square East	16	April 27, 2015
Corporation Square	14	April 27, 2015
Cotton Court / Waring Street	12	April 27, 2015
Donegall Quay	16	April 27, 2015
Dunbar Link / Gordon Street	8	April 27, 2015
Duncairn Centre / Antrim Road	8	April 27, 2015
Europa Bus Station / Blackstaff Square	16	April 27, 2015
Gasworks (Cromac Street)	12	April 27, 2015
Gasworks (Lagan Towpath)	16	April 27, 2015
Great Victoria Street / Hope Street	18	April 27, 2015
Linenhall Street / Donegall Square South	16	April 27, 2015
Millfield / Divis Street	18	April 27, 2015
North Street / Waring Street	16	April 27, 2015
Odyssey / Sydenham Road	22	April 27, 2015
Royal Avenue / Castlecourt	12	April 27, 2015
Smithfield / Winetavern Street	12	April 27, 2015
St George's Market / Cromac Square	12	April 27, 2015
Victoria Square / Victoria Street	10	April 27, 2015
Waterfront	24	April 27, 2015
Writer's Square / St Anne's Cathedral	16	April 27, 2015
Queens University / Botanic Gardens	14	November 27, 2015
Queens University / University Road	16	November 27, 2015
Titanic Quarter	18	December 1, 2015
Belfast City Hospital / Lisburn Road	14	August 1, 2016
Royal Victoria Hospital	20	August 1, 2016
Mater Hospital / Crumlin Road	10	September 7, 2016
Girdwood Community Hub	18	October 13, 2016
Shankill Leisure Centre	18	October 13, 2016
CS Lewis Square	16	November 22, 2016

== See also ==
- List of bicycle-sharing systems
