= List of statutory rules of Northern Ireland, 1998 =

This is an incomplete list of statutory rules of Northern Ireland in 1998.

== 1-100 ==
- Social Security (Miscellaneous Amendments) Regulations (Northern Ireland) 1998 (S.R. 1998 No. 2))
- Social Fund Winter Fuel Payment Regulations (Northern Ireland) 1998 (S.R. 1998 No. 3)
- Race Relations (Prescribed Public Bodies) Regulations (Northern Ireland) 1998 (S.R. 1998 No. 4)
- Criminal Justice (Serious Fraud) (Northern Ireland) Order 1988 (Notice of Transfer) (Amendment) Regulations 1998 (S.R. 1998 No. 6)
- Children's Evidence (Northern Ireland) Order 1995 (Notice of Transfer) (Amendment) Regulations 1998 (S.R. 1998 No. 7)
- Child Support (Miscellaneous Amendments) Regulations (Northern Ireland) 1998 (S.R. 1998 No. 8)
- General Medical Services (Amendment) Regulations (Northern Ireland) 1998 (S.R. 1998 No. 9)
- Jobseeker's Allowance (Amendment) Regulations (Northern Ireland) 1998 (S.R. 1998 No. 10)
- Education (Pupil Records) Regulations (Northern Ireland) 1998 (S.R. 1998 No. 11)
- Education (Individual Pupils' Achievements) (Information) Regulations (Northern Ireland) 1998 (S.R. 1998 No. 12)
- Medical Practitioners (Vocational Training) Regulations (Northern Ireland) 1998 (S.R. 1998 No. 13)
- Plant Health (Amendment) Order (Northern Ireland) 1998 (S.R. 1998 No. 16)
- Registered Rents (Increase) Order (Northern Ireland) 1998 (S.R. 1998 No. 17)
- Street Works (Qualifications of Supervisors and Operatives) Regulations (Northern Ireland) 1998 (S.R. 1998 No. 20)
- County Court (Amendment) Rules (Northern Ireland) 1998 (S.R. 1998 No. 21)
- Education (Student Loans) (Amendment) Regulations (Northern Ireland) 1998 (S.R. 1998 No. 22)
- Food Protection (Emergency Prohibitions) (Amendment) Order (Northern Ireland) 1998 (S.R. 1998 No. 23)
- Bread and Flour Regulations (Northern Ireland) 1998 (S.R. 1998 No. 24)
- Carrickfergus Harbour Order (Northern Ireland) 1998 (S.R. 1998 No. 25)
- Cattle Identification (Enforcement) Regulations (Northern Ireland) 1998 (S.R. 1998 No. 27)
- Industrial Pollution Control (Prescribed Processes and Substances) Regulations (Northern Ireland) 1998 (S.R. 1998 No. 28)
- Industrial Pollution Control (Applications, Appeals and Registers) Regulations (Northern Ireland) 1998 (S.R. 1998 No. 29)
- Industrial Pollution Control (Authorisation of Processes) (Determination Periods) Order (Northern Ireland) 1998 (S.R. 1998 No. 30)
- Hill Livestock (Compensatory Allowances) (Amendment) Regulations (Northern Ireland) 1998 (S.R. 1998 No. 34)
- Social Security (Contributions and Industrial Injuries) (Canada) Order (Northern Ireland) 1998 (S.R. 1998 No. 39)
- Beef Carcass (Classification) (Amendment) Regulation (Northern Ireland) 1998 (S.R. 1998 No. 40)
- Local Government (Superannuation and Compensation) (Institutions of Further Education) Regulations (Northern Ireland) 1998 (S.R. 1998 No. 41)
- Northern Ireland Fishery Harbour Authority (Accounts) Regulations (Northern Ireland) 1998 (S.R. 1998 No. 42)
- Products of Animal Origin (Import and Export) Regulations (Northern Ireland) 1998 (S.R. 1998 No. 45)
- Conservation of Scallops (Amendment) Regulations (Northern Ireland) 1998 (S.R. 1998 No. 46)
- Offshore Noise and Electricity Regulations (Northern Ireland) 1998 (S.R. 1998 No. 47)
- Measuring Equipment (Capacity Measures) Regulations (Northern Ireland) 1998 (S.R. 1998 No. 48)
- Students Awards (Amendment) Regulations (Northern Ireland) 1998 (S.R. 1998 No. 50)
- Education (Student Loans) (1998 Order) (Commencement) Order (Northern Ireland) 1998 (S.R. 1998 No. 51)
- Guaranteed Minimum Pensions Increase Order (Northern Ireland) 1998 (S.R. 1998 No. 52)
- Industrial Pollution Control (1997 Order) (Commencement No. 1) Order (Northern Ireland) 1998 (S.R. 1998 No. 53)
- Social Security (Incapacity for Work) (General) (Amendment) Regulation (Northern Ireland) 1998 (S.R. 1998 No. 54)
- Spreadable Fats (Marketing Standards) (Amendment) Regulations (Northern Ireland) 1998 (S.R. 1998 No. 55)
- Gaming (Variation of Monetary Limits) Order (Northern Ireland) 1998 (S.R. 1998 No. 56)
- Gaming Machine (Prescribed Licensed Premises) Regulations (Northern Ireland) 1998 (S.R. 1998 No. 57)
- Education (Student Loans) Regulations (Northern Ireland) 1998 (S.R. 1998 No. 58)
- Social Security Benefits Up-rating Order (Northern Ireland) 1998 (S.R. 1998 No. 59)
- Rates (Regional Rates) Order (Northern Ireland) 1998 (S.R. 1998 No. 60)
- Social Security (Contributions) (Re-rating and Northern Ireland National Insurance Fund Payments) Order (Northern Ireland) 1998 (S.R. 1998 No. 61)
- Statutory Maternity Pay (Compensation of Employers) (Amendment) Regulations (Northern Ireland) 1998 (S.R. 1998 No. 62)
- Social Security Benefits Up-rating Regulations (Northern Ireland) 1998 (S.R. 1998 No. 63)
- Social Security (Industrial Injuries) (Dependency) (Permitted Earnings Limits) Order (Northern Ireland) 1998 (S.R. 1998 No. 64)
- Museums and Galleries (1998 Order) (Commencement) Order (Northern Ireland) 1998 (S.R. 1998 No. 65)
- Pensions Increase (Review) Order (Northern Ireland) 1998 (S.R. 1998 No. 66)
- Mines (Substances Hazardous to Health) Regulations (Northern Ireland) 1998 (S.R. 1998 No. 67)
- Courses for Drink-Drive Offenders (Designation of District) Order (Northern Ireland) 1998 (S.R. 1998 No. 68)
- Meat (Sterilisation and Staining) (Amendment) Regulations (Northern Ireland) 1998 (S.R. 1998 No. 69)
- Social Security (Contributions) (Re-rating) Consequential Amendment Regulations (Northern Ireland) 1998 (S.R. 1998 No. 71)
- Social Security (Contributions) (Amendment) Regulations (Northern Ireland) 1998 (S.R. 1998 No. 72)
- Housing Benefit (General) (Amendment) Regulations (Northern Ireland) 1998 (S.R. 1998 No. 73)
- Motor Vehicle Testing (Amendment) Regulations (Northern Ireland) 1998 (S.R. 1998 No. 74)
- Goods Vehicles (Testing) (Amendment) Regulations (Northern Ireland) 1998 (S.R. 1998 No. 75)
- Public Service Vehicles (Amendment) Regulations (Northern Ireland) 1998 (S.R. 1998 No. 76)
- Electrical Equipment for Explosive Atmospheres (Certification) (Amendment) Regulations (Northern Ireland) 1998 (S.R. 1998 No. 77)
- Employer's Liability (Compulsory Insurance) Exemption Regulations (Northern Ireland) 1998 (S.R. 1998 No. 78)
- Royal Ulster Constabulary Pensions (Provision of Information) Regulations 1998 (S.R. 1998 No. 79)
- Social Security (Miscellaneous Amendments No. 2) Regulations (Northern Ireland) 1998 (S.R. 1998 No. 81)
- Further Education (1997 Order) (Commencement) Order (Northern Ireland) 1998 (S.R. 1998 No. 82)
- Health Services (Proposals for Pilot Schemes) Regulations (Northern Ireland) 1998 (S.R. 1998 No. 83)
- Workmen's Compensation (Supplementation) (Amendment) Regulations (Northern Ireland) 1998 (S.R. 1998 No. 84)
- Occupational and Personal Pension Schemes (Levy and Register) (Amendments) Regulations (Northern Ireland) 1998 (S.R. 1998 No. 85)
- Optical Charges and Payments (Amendment) Regulations (Northern Ireland) 1998 (S.R. 1998 No. 86)
- Proceeds of Crime (Countries and Territories designated under the Criminal Justice Act 1988) Order (Northern Ireland) 1998 (S.R. 1998 No. 88)
- Legal Aid (Assessment of Resources) (Amendment) Regulations (Northern Ireland) 1998 (S.R. 1998 No. 89)
- Legal Advice and Assistance (Amendment) Regulations (Northern Ireland) 1998 (S.R. 1998 No. 90)
- Legal Advice and Assistance (Financial Conditions) Regulations (Northern Ireland) 1998 (S.R. 1998 No. 91)
- Legal Aid (Financial Conditions) Regulations (Northern Ireland) 1998 (S.R. 1998 No. 92)
- Dental Charges (Amendment) Regulations (Northern Ireland) 1998 (S.R. 1998 No. 93)
- Charges for Drugs and Appliances (Amendment) Regulations (Northern Ireland) 1998 (S.R. 1998 No. 94)
- Pharmaceutical Services (Amendment) Regulations (Northern Ireland) 1998 (S.R. 1998 No. 95)
- Further Education Teachers' (Eligibility) (Amendment) Regulations (Northern Ireland) 1998 (S.R. 1998 No. 96)

== 101-200 ==
- Social Security (Contributions) (Amendment No. 2) Regulations (Northern Ireland) 1998 (S.R. 1998 No. 103)
- Race Relations (Complaints to Industrial Tribunals) (Armed Forces) Regulations (Northern Ireland) 1998 (S.R. 1998 No. 104)
- Equal Pay (Complaints to Industrial Tribunals) (Armed Forces) Regulations (Northern Ireland) 1998 (S.R. 1998 No. 105)
- Sex Discrimination (Complaints to Industrial Tribunals) (Armed Forces) Regulations (Northern Ireland) 1998 (S.R. 1998 No. 106)
- Potatoes Originating in Egypt Regulations (Northern Ireland) 1998 (S.R. 1998 No. 107)
- Animal By-Products (Amendment) Regulations (Northern Ireland) 1998 (S.R. 1998 No. 108)
- Social Security (Amendment) (Lone Parents) Regulations (Northern Ireland) 1998 (S.R. 1998 No. 112)
- Measuring Equipment (Liquid Fuel and Lubricants) Regulations (Northern Ireland) 1998 (S.R. 1998 No. 113)
- Housing Benefit (General) (Amendment No. 2) Regulations (Northern Ireland) 1998 (S.R. 1998 No. 114)
- School Admissions (Appeal Tribunals) Regulations (Northern Ireland) 1998 (S.R. 1998 No. 115)
- Motor Vehicles (Construction and Use) (Amendment) Regulations (Northern Ireland) 1998 (S.R. 1998 No. 116)
- Education (Amendment) Order (Northern Ireland) 1998 (S.R. 1998 No. 117)
- Curriculum (Programme of Study and Attainment targets in Irish in Irish Speaking Schools at Key Stages 3 and 4) Order (Northern Ireland) 1998 (S.R. 1998 No. 118)
- Education Reform (1989 Order) (Commencement No. 9) Order (Northern Ireland) 1998 (S.R. 1998 No. 119)
- Ulster Community and Hospitals Health and Social Services Trust (Establishment) Order (Northern Ireland) 1998 (S.R. 1998 No. 121)
- Ulster North Down and Ards Hospitals Health and Social Services Trust (Dissolution) Order (Northern Ireland) 1998 (S.R. 1998 No. 122)
- North Down and Ards Community Health and Social Services Trust (Dissolution) Order (Northern Ireland) 1998 (S.R. 1998 No. 123)
- Feeding Stuffs (Amendment) Regulations (Northern Ireland) 1998 (S.R. 1998 No. 124)
- Health and Safety (Fees) Regulations (Northern Ireland) 1998 (S.R. 1998 No. 125)
- New Deal (Miscellaneous Provisions) Order (Northern Ireland) 1998 (S.R. 1998 No. 127)
- Misuse of Druga (Amendment) Regulations (Northern Ireland) 1998 (S.R. 1998 No. 128)
- Misuse of Drugs (Designation) (Variation) Order (Northern Ireland) 1998 (S.R. 1998 No. 129)
- Employment Rights (Increase of Limits) Order (Northern Ireland) 1998 (S.R. 1998 No. 130)
- Carriage of Dangerous Goods by Rail Regulations (Northern Ireland) 1998 (S.R. 1998 No. 131)
- Packaging, Labelling and Carriage of Radioactive Material by Rail Regulations (Northern Ireland) 1998 (S.R. 1998 No. 132)
- Local Government (Superannuation) (Amendment) Regulations (Northern Ireland) 1998 (S.R. 1998 No. 133)
- Charges for Drugs and Appliances (Amendment No. 2) Regulations (Northern Ireland) 1998 (S.R. 1998 No. 135)
- Social Security (Minimum Contributions to Appropriate Personal Pension Schemes) Order (Northern Ireland) 1998 (S.R. 1998 No. 136)
- Social Security (Reduced Rates of Class 1 Contributions, and Rebates) (Money Purchase Contracted-out Schemes) Order (Northern Ireland) 1998 (S.R. 1998 No. 137)
- Health and Personal Social Services (Assessment of Resources) (Amendment) Regulations (Northern Ireland) 1998 (S.R. 1998 No. 138)
- Residential Care Homes (Amendment) Regulations (Northern Ireland) 1998 (S.R. 1998 No. 139)
- Nursing Homes (Amendment) Regulations (Northern Ireland) 1998 (S.R. 1998 No. 140)
- Level Crossing (Damhead North) Order (Northern Ireland) 1998 (S.R. 1998 No. 141)
- Level Crossing (Macfinn) Order (Northern Ireland) 1998 (S.R. 1998 No. 142)
- Level Crossing (Balnamore) Order (Northern Ireland) 1998 (S.R. 1998 No. 143)
- Level Crossing (Coldagh) Order (Northern Ireland) 1998 (S.R. 1998 No. 144)
- Plant Health (Amendment No. 2) Order (Northern Ireland) 1998 (S.R. 1998 No. 146)
- Planning (Control of Advertisements) (Amendment) Regulations (Northern Ireland) 1998 (S.R. 1998 No. 147)
- Ports (Levy on Disposals of Land, etc.) (Amendment) Order (Northern Ireland) 1998 (S.R. 1998 No. 148)
- Lands Tribunal (Salaries) Order (Northern Ireland) 1998 (S.R. 1998 No. 155)
- Street Works (Sharing of Costs of Works) Regulations (Northern Ireland) 1998 (S.R. 1998 No. 156)
- Bovine Hides Regulations (Northern Ireland) 1998 (S.R. 1998 No. 158)
- Nurses, Midwives and Health Visitors (Professional Conduct) (Amendment) Rules 1998, Approval Order (Northern Ireland) 1998 (S.R. 1998 No. 159)
- Bovines and Bovine Products (Trade) Regulations (Northern Ireland) 1998 (S.R. 1998 No. 163)
- Social Security Revaluation of Earnings Factors Order (Northern Ireland) 1998 (S.R. 1998 No. 164)
- Income Support (General) (Standard Interest Rate Amendment) Regulations (Northern Ireland) 1998 (S.R. 1998 No. 165)
- Litter (Fixed Penalty) Order (Northern Ireland) 1998 (S.R. 1998 No. 166)
- Social Security (Miscellaneous Amendments No. 3) Regulations (Northern Ireland) 1998 (S.R. 1998 No. 176)
- Departments (Transfer of Functions) (No. 2) Order (Northern Ireland) 1998 (S.R. 1998 No. 177)
- Lands Tribunal (Superannuation) (Amendment) Order (Northern Ireland) 1998 (S.R. 1998 No. 180)
- Salaries (Assembly Ombudsman and Commissioner for Complaints) Order (Northern Ireland) 1998 (S.R. 1998 No. 181)
- Social Security (Miscellaneous Amendments No. 4) Regulations (Northern Ireland) 1998 (S.R. 1998 No. 182)
- Disability Discrimination Act 1995 (Commencement No. 5) Order (Northern Ireland) 1998 (S.R. 1998 No. 183)
- Local Government (General Grant) Order (Northern Ireland) 1998 (S.R. 1998 No. 185)
- Fertilisers (Mammalian Meat and Bone Meal) Regulations (Northern Ireland) 1998 (S.R. 1998 No. 187)
- Fertilisers (Mammalian Meat and Bone Meal) (Conditions of Manufacture) Regulations (Northern Ireland) 1998 (S.R. 1998 No. 188)
- Bookmaking (Licensed Offices) (Amendment) Regulations (Northern Ireland) 1998 (S.R. 1998 No. 190)
- Bee Disease Control Order (Northern Ireland) 1998 (S.R. 1998 No. 191)
- Health Services (Pilot Schemes - Health Services Bodies) Regulations (Northern Ireland) 1998 (S.R. 1998 No. 192)
- Health Services (Pilot Schemes: Financial Assistance for Preparatory Work) Regulations (Northern Ireland) 1998 (S.R. 1998 No. 193)
- Horse Racing (Charges on Bookmakers) Order (Northern Ireland) 1998 (S.R. 1998 No. 194)
- Street Works (1995 Order) (Commencement No. 3) Order (Northern Ireland) 1998 (S.R. 1998 No. 196)
- Social Security (Amendment) (New Deal) Regulations (Northern Ireland) 1998 (S.R. 1998 No. 198)
- County Court (Amendment No. 2) Rules (Northern Ireland) 1998 (S.R. 1998 No. 199)
- Legal Aid in Criminal Proceedings (Costs) (Amendment) Rules (Northern Ireland) 1998 (S.R. 1998 No. 200)

== 201-300 ==
- Proceeds of Crime (Northern Ireland) Order 1996 (Code of Practice) Order 1998 (S.R. 1998 No. 201)
- Welfare of Calves at Markets Regulations (Northern Ireland) 1998 (S.R. 1998 No. 202)
- Welfare of Animals and Poultry at Markets Order (Northern Ireland) 1998 (S.R. 1998 No. 203)
- Social Security (Student Amounts Amendment) Regulations (Northern Ireland) 1998 (S.R. 1998 No. 204)
- Education (Special Educational Needs Code of Practice) (Appointed Day) (Northern Ireland) Order 1998 (S.R. 1998 No. 205)
- Food Safety (Fishery Products and Live Shellfish) (Hygiene) Regulations (Northern Ireland) 1998 (S.R. 1998 No. 207)
- Occupational Pension Schemes (Contracting-out) (Amount Required for Restoring State Scheme Rights and Miscellaneous Amendment) Regulations (Northern Ireland) 1998 (S.R. 1998 No. 208)
- Apple and Pear Orchard Grubbing Up Regulations (Northern Ireland) 1998 (S.R. 1998 No. 209)
- Welfare Foods (Amendment) Regulations (Northern Ireland) 1998 (S.R. 1998 No. 210)
- Education (Special Educational Needs) (Amendment) Regulations (Northern Ireland) 1998 (S.R. 1998 No. 217)
- Larne Harbour Order (Northern Ireland) 1998 (S.R. 1998 No. 221)
- Planning (General Development) (Amendment) Order (Northern Ireland) 1998 (S.R. 1998 No. 222)
- Planning (Fees) (Amendment) Regulations (Northern Ireland) 1998 (S.R. 1998 No. 223)
- Motor Vehicles (Construction and Use) (Amendment No. 2) Regulations (Northern Ireland) 1998 (S.R. 1998 No. 225)
- Goods Vehicles (Testing) (Amendment No. 2) Regulations (Northern Ireland) 1998 (S.R. 1998 No. 226)
- Occupational Pension Schemes (Modification of the Pension Schemes (Northern Ireland) Act 1993) Regulations (Northern Ireland) 1998 (S.R. 1998 No. 227)
- Local Government (Competition in Functional Work) (Amendment) Regulations (Northern Ireland) 1998 (S.R. 1998 No. 228)
- Occupational Pension Schemes (Scheme Administration) (Amendment) Regulations (Northern Ireland) 1998 (S.R. 1998 No. 229)
- Disability Discrimination (Abolition of District Advisory Committees) Order (Northern Ireland) 1998 (S.R. 1998 No. 230)
- Sex Discrimination Code of Practice (Recruitment and Selection) (Appointed Day) Order (Northern Ireland) 1998 (S.R. 1998 No. 231)
- Social Security (Amendment) (Personal Allowances for Children) Regulations (Northern Ireland) 1998 (S.R. 1998 No. 232)
- Occupational Pension Schemes (Bank of England Act) (Consequential Amendments) Regulations (Northern Ireland) 1998 (S.R. 1998 No. 233)
- Royal Group of Hospitals and Dental Hospital Health and Social Services Trust (Establishment) (Amendment) Order (Northern Ireland) 1998 (S.R. 1998 No. 234)
- Police (Health and Safety) (Northern Ireland) Order 1997 (Commencement) Order 1998 (S.R. 1998 No. 235)
- Animals and Animal Products (Examination for Residues and Maximum Residue Limits) Regulations (Northern Ireland) 1998 (S.R. 1998 No. 237)
- Environmental Information (Amendment) Regulations (Northern Ireland) 1998 (S.R. 1998 No. 238)
- Child Benefit and Social Security (Fixing and Adjustment of Rates) (Amendment) Regulations (Northern Ireland) 1998 (S.R. 1998 No. 239)
- Royal Ulster Constabulary Pensions (Amendment) Regulations 1998 (S.R. 1998 No. 240)
- Social Security (Claims and Payments) (Amendment) Regulations (Northern Ireland) 1998 (S.R. 1998 No. 241)
- Suspension from Work on Maternity Grounds (Merchant Shipping and Fishing Vessels) Order (Northern Ireland) 1998 (S.R. 1998 No. 242)
- Fisheries and Aquaculture Structures (Grants) (Amendment) Regulations (Northern Ireland) 1998 (S.R. 1998 No. 243)
- General Dental Services (Amendment) Regulations (Northern Ireland) 1998 (S.R. 1998 No. 245)
- Social Security (Categorisation of Earners) (Amendment) Regulations (Northern Ireland) 1998 (S.R. 1998 No. 250)
- Welfare of Livestock (Amendment) Regulations (Northern Ireland) 1998 (S.R. 1998 No. 251)
- Housing Benefit (General) (Amendment No. 3) Regulations (Northern Ireland) 1998 (S.R. 1998 No. 252)
- Food Labelling (Amendment) Regulations (Northern Ireland) 1998 (S.R. 1998 No. 253)
- Schools (Suspension and Expulsion of Pupils) (Amendment) Regulations (Northern Ireland) 1998 (S.R. 1998 No. 255)
- Schools (Expulsion of Pupils) (Appeal Tribunals) (Amendment) Regulations (Northern Ireland) 1998 (S.R. 1998 No. 256)
- Industrial Training Levy (Construction Industry) Order (Northern Ireland) 1998 (S.R. 1998 No. 257)
- Criminal Justice (Children) (1998 Order) (Commencement No. 1) Order (Northern Ireland) 1998 (S.R. 1998 No. 260)
- Children (1995 Order) (Amendment) (Children's Services Planning) Order (Northern Ireland) 1998 (S.R. 1998 No. 261)
- Education (Student Loans) (Amendment) Regulations (Northern Ireland) 1998 (S.R. 1998 No. 262)
- Social Security (Guardian's Allowances) (Amendment) Regulations (Northern Ireland) 1998 (S.R. 1998 No. 263)
- Plastic Materials and Articles in Contact with Food Regulations (Northern Ireland) 1998 (S.R. 1998 No. 264)
- Pensions Appeal Tribunals (Northern Ireland) (Amendment) Rules 1998 (S.R. 1998 No. 265)
- Occupational Pension Schemes (Validation of Rule Alterations) Regulations (Northern Ireland) 1998 (S.R. 1998 No. 267)
- Industrial Pollution Control (Prescribed Processes and Substances) (Amendment) Regulations (Northern Ireland) 1998 (S.R. 1998 No. 268)
- Eggs (Marketing Standards) (Amendment) Regulations (Northern Ireland) 1998 (S.R. 1998 No. 269)
- Passenger and Goods Vehicles (Recording Equipment) Regulations (Northern Ireland) 1998 (S.R. 1998 No. 270)
- Salaries (Comptroller and Auditor General) Order (Northern Ireland) 1998 (S.R. 1998 No. 272)
- Students Awards Regulations (Northern Ireland) 1998 (S.R. 1998 No. 273)
- Employment Rights (Dispute Resolution) (1998 Order) (Commencement No. 1 and Transitional and Saving Provisions) Order (Northern Ireland) 1998 (S.R. 1998 No. 274)
- Social Fund Winter Fuel Payment (Amendment) Regulations (Northern Ireland) 1998 (S.R. 1998 No. 276)
- Superannuation (Commission for Racial Equality (Northern Ireland)) Order (Northern Ireland) 1998 (S.R. 1998 No. 278)
- Cattle Identification (No. 2) Regulations (Northern Ireland) 1998 (S.R. 1998 No. 279)
- Code of Practice (Picketing) (Appointed Day) Order (Northern Ireland) 1998 (S.R. 1998 No. 280)
- Control of Lead at Work Regulations (Northern Ireland) 1998 (S.R. 1998 No. 281)
- Local Government (Compensation for Premature Retirement) (Amendment) Regulations (Northern Ireland) 1998 (S.R. 1998 No. 286)
- Code of Practice (Redundancy Consultation and Procedures) (Appointed Day) Order (Northern Ireland) 1998 (S.R. 1998 No. 287)
- Waste and Contaminated Land (1997 Order) (Commencement No. 1) Order (Northern Ireland) 1998 (S.R. 1998 No. 288)
- Special Waste Regulations (Northern Ireland) 1998 (S.R. 1998 No. 289)
- Game Birds Preservation Order (Northern Ireland) 1998 (S.R. 1998 No. 290)
- Tuberculosis Control (Amendment) Order (Northern Ireland) 1998 (S.R. 1998 No. 293)
- Health Services (Pilot Schemes: Financial Assistance for Preparatory Work) (Amendment) Regulations (Northern Ireland) 1998 (S.R. 1998 No. 294)
- Road Traffic Regulation (1997 Order) (Commencement No. 2) Order (Northern Ireland) 1998 (S.R. 1998 No. 296)
- Disabled Persons (Badges for Motor Vehicles) (Amendment) Regulations (Northern Ireland) 1998 (S.R. 1998 No. 297)
- Education (Student Support) Regulations (Northern Ireland) 1998 (S.R. 1998 No. 298)
- Health and Personal Social Services (Superannuation) (Amendment) Regulations (Northern Ireland) 1998 (S.R. 1998 No. 299)
- Students Awards (Amendment) Regulations (Northern Ireland) 1998 (S.R. 1998 No. 300)

== 301-400 ==
- Health Services (Primary Care) (1997 Order) (Commencement No. 2) Order (Northern Ireland) 1998 (S.R. 1998 No. 301)
- Education (Student Loans) (Amendment No. 2) Regulations (Northern Ireland) 1998 (S.R. 1998 No. 303)
- Green Park Health and Social Services Trust (Establishment) (Amendment) Order (Northern Ireland) 1998 (S.R. 1998 No. 304)
- Belfast City Hospital Health and Social Services Trust (Establishment) (Amendment) Order (Northern Ireland) 1998 (S.R. 1998 No. 305)
- Education (Student Support) (Northern Ireland) Order 1998 (Commencement and Transitional Provisions) Order (Northern Ireland) 1998 (S.R. 1998 No. 306)
- Education (Target-Setting in Schools) Regulations (Northern Ireland) 1998 (S.R. 1998 No. 307)
- Arable Area Payments (Amendment) Regulations (Northern Ireland) 1998 (S.R. 1998 No. 308)
- New Deal (Miscellaneous Provisions) (Amendment) Order (Northern Ireland) 1998 (S.R. 1998 No. 309)
- Fish Health Regulations (Northern Ireland) 1998 (S.R. 1998 No. 310)
- Social Security (1998 Order) (Commencement No. 1) Order (Northern Ireland) 1998 (S.R. 1998 No. 312)
- Plant Health (Amendment No. 3) Order (Northern Ireland) 1998 (S.R. 1998 No. 315)
- Pharmaceutical Services (Amendment No. 2) Regulations (Northern Ireland) 1998 (S.R. 1998 No. 316)
- Social Security (Contributions) (Amendment No. 3) Regulations (Northern Ireland) 1998 (S.R. 1998 No. 317)
- Trunk Roads (Designation of Routes) Order (Northern Ireland) 1998 (S.R. 1998 No. 318)
- Education and Libraries (Defined Activities) (Exemptions) (Amendment) Order (Northern Ireland) 1998 (S.R. 1998 No. 320)
- Education and Libraries (Competition in Functional Work) (Amendment) Regulations (Northern Ireland) 1998 (S.R. 1998 No. 321)
- Seeds (Fees) Regulations (Northern Ireland) 1998 (S.R. 1998 No. 322)
- Health and Personal Social Services (Fund-holding Practices) (Amendment) Regulations (Northern Ireland) 1998 (S.R. 1998 No. 323)
- Social Security (Welfare to Work) Regulations (Northern Ireland) 1998 (S.R. 1998 No. 324)
- Housing Benefit (Amendment) (New Deal) Regulations (Northern Ireland) 1998 (S.R. 1998 No. 325)
- Social Security (Amendment) (New Deal No. 2) Regulations (Northern Ireland) 1998 (S.R. 1998 No. 326)
- Social Security (Amendment) (Capital) Regulations (Northern Ireland) 1998 (S.R. 1998 No. 327)
- Smoke Control Areas (Sale or Delivery of Unauthorised Fuel) Regulations (Northern Ireland) 1998 (S.R. 1998 No. 328)
- Sulphur Content of Solid Fuel Regulations (Northern Ireland) 1998 (S.R. 1998 No. 329)
- Births, Deaths and Marriages (Fees) Order (Northern Ireland) 1998 (S.R. 1998 No. 330)
- Animals (Scientific Procedures) Act (Amendment to Schedule 2) Order (Northern Ireland) 1998 (S.R. 1998 No. 331)
- Social Security (Contributions) (Amendment No. 4) Regulations (Northern Ireland) 1998 (S.R. 1998 No. 332)
- Teachers Superannuation Regulations (Northern Ireland) 1998 (S.R. 1998 No. 333)
- Local Government (Superannuation) (Interchange) Regulations (Northern Ireland) 1998 (S.R. 1998 No. 337)
- Extraction Solvents in Food (Amendment) Regulations (Northern Ireland) 1998 (S.R. 1998 No. 345)
- Police (1998 Act) (Commencement No. 1) Order (Northern Ireland) 1998 (S.R. 1998 No. 346)
- Housing Benefit (Recovery of Overpayments) (Amendment) Regulations (Northern Ireland) 1998 (S.R. 1998 No. 348)
- Social Fund (Cold Weather Payments) (General) (Amendment) Regulations (Northern Ireland) 1998 (S.R. 1998 No. 351)
- Local Government (Defined Activities) (Exemptions) Order (Northern Ireland) 1998 (S.R. 1998 No. 352)
- Fertilisers (Amendment) Regulations (Northern Ireland) 1998 (S.R. 1998 No. 353)
- Pneumoconiosis, etc., (Workers' Compensation) (Payment of Claims) (Amendment) Regulations (Northern Ireland) 1998 (S.R. 1998 No. 358)
- Drinking Milk Regulations (Northern Ireland) 1998 (S.R. 1998 No. 359)
- Motor Vehicles (Type Approval) (Amendment) Regulations (Northern Ireland) 1998 (S.R. 1998 No. 363)
- Motor Vehicles (Use of Dynamic Axle Weighing Machines) Regulations (Northern Ireland) 1998 (S.R. 1998 No. 364)
- Diseases of Animals (Modification) Order (Northern Ireland) 1998 (S.R. 1998 No. 365)
- Sheep and Goats (Spongiform Encephalopathy) Order (Northern Ireland) 1998 (S.R. 1998 No. 366)
- Sheep and Goats (Spongiform Encephalopathy) Regulations (Northern Ireland) 1998 (S.R. 1998 No. 367)
- Countryside Access (Amendment) Regulations (Northern Ireland) 1998 (S.R. 1998 No. 368)
- National Minimum Wage (Employment Dismissal Procedures Agreements) (Repeal) Order (Northern Ireland) 1998 (S.R. 1998 No. 372)
- Feeding Stuffs (Amendment) (No. 2) Regulations (Northern Ireland) 1998 (S.R. 1998 No. 373)
- Weighing Equipment (Filling and Discontinuous Totalising Automatic Weighing Machines) (Amendment) Regulations (Northern Ireland) 1998 (S.R. 1998 No. 374)
- Mines (Safety of Exit) Regulations (Northern Ireland) 1998 (S.R. 1998 No. 375)
- Dentists Act 1984 (Amendment) Order (Northern Ireland) 1998 (S.R. 1998 No. 376)
- New Drivers (Appeals Procedure) Regulations (Northern Ireland) 1998 (S.R. 1998 No. 377)
- Road Traffic (New Drivers) (1998 Order) (Commencement) Order (Northern Ireland) 1998 (S.R. 1998 No. 378)
- Motor Vehicles (Driving Licences) (Amendment) Regulations (Northern Ireland) 1998 (S.R. 1998 No. 379)
- Motor Vehicles (Specified Restrictions) Regulations (Northern Ireland) 1998 (S.R. 1998 No. 380)
- Motor Vehicles (Speed Limit Restriction) (Exemption) Regulations (Northern Ireland) 1998 (S.R. 1998 No. 381)
- Olive Oil (Marketing Standards) (Amendment) Regulations (Northern Ireland) 1998 (S.R. 1998 No. 383)
- Spreadable Fats (Marketing Standards) (Amendment No. 2) Regulations (Northern Ireland) 1998 (S.R. 1998 No. 384)
- Working Time Regulations (Northern Ireland) 1998 (S.R. 1998 No. 386)
- Human Organ Transplants (Establishment of Relationship) Regulations (Northern Ireland) 1998 (S.R. 1998 No. 389)
- Waste and Contaminated Land (1997 Order) (Commencement No. 2) Order (Northern Ireland) 1998 (S.R. 1998 No. 390)
- Disability Discrimination (Exemption for Small Employers) Order (Northern Ireland) 1998 (S.R. 1998 No. 391)
- Identification and Movement of Sheep and Goats (Amendment) Order (Northern Ireland) 1998 (S.R. 1998 No. 393)
- Social Security (1998 Order) (Commencement No. 2) Order (Northern Ireland) 1998 (S.R. 1998 No. 395)
- Housing Renovation etc. Grants (Reduction of Grant) (Amendment) Regulations (Northern Ireland) 1998 (S.R. 1998 No. 396)
- Surface Waters (Dangerous Substances) (Classification) Regulations (Northern Ireland) 1998 (S.R. 1998 No. 397)
- Child Support (Miscellaneous Amendments No. 2) Regulations (Northern Ireland) 1998 (S.R. 1998 No. 400)

== 401-462 ==
- Groundwater Regulations (Northern Ireland) 1998 (S.R. 1998 No. 401)
- Fisheries (Licence Duties) Byelaws (Northern Ireland) 1998 (S.R. 1998 No. 402)
- Eel Fishing (Licence Duties) Regulations (Northern Ireland) 1998 (S.R. 1998 No. 403)
- Health Services (Choice of Dental Practitioner) Regulations (Northern Ireland) 1998 (S.R. 1998 No. 404)
- Supreme Court Fees (Amendment) Order (Northern Ireland) 1998 (S.R. 1998 No. 406)
- Supreme Court (Non-Contentious Probate) Fees (Amendment) Order (Northern Ireland) 1998 (S.R. 1998 No. 407)
- Family Proceedings Fees (Amendment) Order (Northern Ireland) 1998 (S.R. 1998 No. 408)
- County Court Fees (Amendment) Order (Northern Ireland) 1998 (S.R. 1998 No. 409)
- Magistrates' Courts Fees (Amendment) Order (Northern Ireland) 1998 (S.R. 1998 No. 410)
- Judgment Enforcement Fees (Amendment) Order (Northern Ireland) 1998 (S.R. 1998 No. 411)
- Health Services (Choice of Medical Practitioner) Regulations (Northern Ireland) 1998 (S.R. 1998 No. 412)
- Health Services (Pilot Schemes: Part VI Practitioners) Regulations (Northern Ireland) 1998 (S.R. 1998 No. 413)
- Razor Shells (Prohibition of Fishing) Regulations (Northern Ireland) 1998 (S.R. 1998 No. 414)
- Motor Vehicles (Driving Licences) (Amendment No. 2) Regulations (Northern Ireland) 1998 (S.R. 1998 No. 415)
- Social Security (Contributions) (Amendment No. 5) Regulations (Northern Ireland) 1998 (S.R. 1998 No. 416)
- Income Support (General) (Standard Interest Rate Amendment No. 2) Regulations (Northern Ireland) 1998 (S.R. 1998 No. 417)
- Jobseeker's Allowance (Amendment) (New Deal) Regulations (Northern Ireland) 1998 (S.R. 1998 No. 418)
- Magistrates' Courts (Amendment) Rules (Northern Ireland) 1998 (S.R. 1998 No. 419)
- Occupational Pensions (Revaluation) Order (Northern Ireland) 1998 (S.R. 1998 No. 420)
- Social Security (New Deal Pilot) Regulations (Northern Ireland) 1998 (S.R. 1998 No. 421)
- Working Time (Amendment) Regulations (Northern Ireland) 1998 (S.R. 1998 No. 422)
- Fair Employment (Specification of Public Authorities) (Amendment) Order (Northern Ireland) 1998 (S.R. 1998 No. 424)
- Street Works (Reinstatement) Regulations (Northern Ireland) 1998 (S.R. 1998 No. 425)
- Appointment of Consultants (Special Agencies) Regulations (Northern Ireland) 1998 (S.R. 1998 No. 426)
- Mental Health (Nurses, Guardianship, Consent to Treatment and Prescribed Forms) (Amendment) Regulations (Northern Ireland) 1998 (S.R. 1998 No. 427)
- Social Security (Claims and Payments) (Amendment No. 2) Regulations (Northern Ireland) 1998 (S.R. 1998 No. 428)
- Environmental Assessment (Forestry) Regulations (Northern Ireland) 1998 (S.R. 1998 No. 437)
- Carriage of Dangerous Goods (Classification, Packaging and Labelling) and Use of Transportable Pressure Receptacles (Amendment) Regulations (Northern Ireland) 1998 (S.R. 1998 No. 438)
- Hill Livestock (Compensatory Allowances) (Amendment) Regulations (Northern Ireland) 1998 (S.R. 1998 No. 439)
- Sheep Annual Premium (Amendment) Regulations (Northern Ireland) 1998 (S.R. 1998 No. 440)
- Electricity (1992 Order) (Commencement No. 3) Order (Northern Ireland) 1998 (S.R. 1998 No. 441)
- Diseases of Animals (Modification) (No. 2) Order (Northern Ireland) 1998 (S.R. 1998 No. 442)
- Meters (Approval of Pattern or Construction and Manner of Installation) Regulations (Northern Ireland) 1998 (S.R. 1998 No. 443)
- Meters (Certification) Regulations (Northern Ireland) 1998 (S.R. 1998 No. 444)
- Drainage (Environmental Assessment) (Amendment) Regulations (Northern Ireland) 1998 (S.R. 1998 No. 446)
- Deseasonalisation Premium (Protection of Payments) (Amendment) Regulations (Northern Ireland) 1998 (S.R. 1998 No. 447)
- Carriage of Dangerous Goods (Amendment) Regulations (Northern Ireland) 1998 (S.R. 1998 No. 448)
- Pre-School Education in Schools (Admissions Criteria) Regulations (Northern Ireland) 1998 (S.R. 1998 No. 449)
- Education (School Information and Prospectuses) (Amendment) Regulations (Northern Ireland) 1998 (S.R. 1998 No. 451)
- Building (Amendment) Regulations (Northern Ireland) 1998 (S.R. 1998 No. 453)
- Housing Benefit (General) (Amendment No. 4) Regulations (Northern Ireland) 1998 (S.R. 1998 No. 455)
- Education (1998 Order) (Commencement No. 1) Order (Northern Ireland) 1998 (S.R. 1998 No. 456)
- Education (Assessment Arrangements for Key Stage 3) (Amendment) Order (Northern Ireland) 1998 (S.R. 1998 No. 457)
- Chemicals (Hazard Information and Packaging for Supply) (Amendment) Regulations (Northern Ireland) 1998 (S.R. 1998 No. 459)
- Education (Student Support) (Northern Ireland) Order 1998 (Commencement No. 2 and Transitional Provisions) Order (Northern Ireland) 1998 (S.R. 1998 No. 460)
- Proceeds of Crime (Countries and Territories designated under the Drug Trafficking Act 1994) (1997 Order) (Amendment) (Northern Ireland) Order 1998 (S.R. 1998 No. 461)
- Proceeds of Crime (Countries and Territories designated under the Criminal Justice Act 1988) (1998 Order) (Amendment) (Northern Ireland) Order 1998 (S.R. 1998 No. 462)
