= Ella Pirrie =

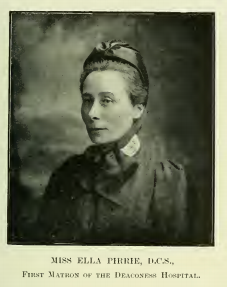
- Born: 1857; Ulster, Ireland
- Died: 31 October 1929 (aged 71–72); George Square, Edinburgh
- Resting place: Dean 1c Cemetery, Edinburgh, Lothian, Scotland
- Occupation: Nurse
- Known for: First nurse at Belfast City Hospital, establishing a nursing school and first matron at the Deaconess Hospital, Edinburgh.

Isabella Barbour Pirrie, DCS (1857–1929), was the first nurse in the Belfast Union Workhouse Infirmary (now the Belfast City Hospital), establishing a nursing school there. She went on to become the first matron at the Deaconess Hospital, Edinburgh, established by Archibald Charteris as a training school for nurses.

== Family and early life ==
Ella Pirrie was born in 1857 in Ulster, the northern province in Ireland. Her father, John Miller Pirrie, MD (1824–1873), was a doctor in the Belfast City Hospital and the Royal Victoria Hospital, and he was president of the Ulster Medical Society 1858–59. Her mother was Isabella Barbour Pirrie (1827–1873). On her father's side, her cousin was The 1st Viscount Pirrie, while her second cousin was John Miller Andrews.

== Training and early career ==
Pirrie trained at the Liverpool Royal Infirmary and subsequently remained there working alongside Mr Edward Robert Bickersteth. Whilst Pirrie was not a student at the Florence Nightingale Faculty of Nursing and Midwifery in London, Nightingale was a mentor for many years, writing several letters to her in Belfast. She gained experience of the Deaconesses in Berlin before returning to her home city of Belfast.

== Belfast Union Workhouse Infirmary ==
In November 1884, Ella Pirrie was appointed Superintendent and Head Nurse at the Belfast Union Workhouse Infirmary (now the Belfast City Hospital), with a yearly salary of £30. She led the introduction of uniforms for paid nurses. She established the first nurse training school in the hospital in 1887, with the first trainees undertaking the three-year course in 1888.

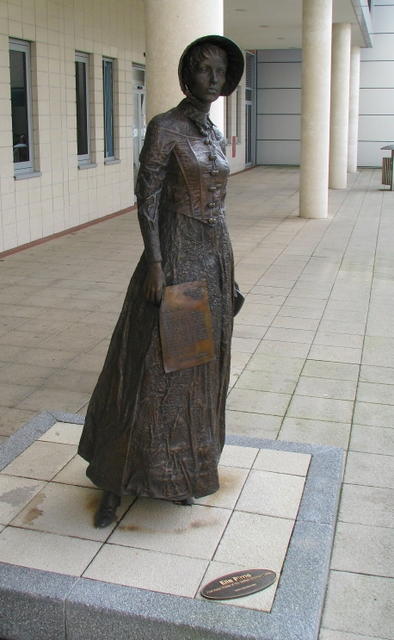
Statue at the Belfast City Hospital

The work was arduous and Florence Nightingale wrote with concern at the stress she was under and inquiring after her ill health and lack of paid help. Nightingale also sent Pirrie presents including an illuminated text by Marcus Ward printers, "I am among you as one who serves.", this was misplaced in 1969 when Erskine House opened.

Pirrie resigned in 1892 due to stress, caring for between 800 and 1000 patients.

== Edinburgh ==
The position of the first matron of the new Church of Scotland Deaconess Hospital was not advertised and Pirrie was sought out for the post based on her reputation of unique qualifications and experience. She was subsequently hired after a meeting with the hospital committee and took up the role in September 1894, remaining in post until 1914.

Pirrie then took up position of Superintendent of the Deaconess Rest House, Edinburgh, in 1916 and retired from service in 1923. She remained at the Rest House, 28 George Square, until her death.

== Commemorations ==
Statue at the Belfast City Hospital, by Ross Wilson, 2007. The statue depicts Pirrie holding one of the letters from Florence Nightingale, sent from London on 14 October 1885, text includes:

"How deep my interest how intense my feeling for you and your work. Every women must feel the same. You have done a noble deed, God will grant the success. You have already done great things You must be the nucleus of hope for a goodly future of trained nursing staff at Belfast Infirmary which needs you and of perhaps a future training school for Nurses. God speed to you. I am always saying in my heart God bless you and your work always."

Plaque at the Greyfriars' Charteris Sanctuary, 138–140 The Pleasance, Edinburgh, 1930. The citation reads:

To the glory of God and in grateful and loving memory of Ella Pirrie, Deaconess who rendered valuable aid in the equipment of the Deaconess Hospital of which she was the first matron from 1894 to 1914. She was the Superintendent of the Deaconess Rest House, Edinburgh from 1916 to 1923. Entered into rest 30th October 1929 "a succourer of many" erected by her fellow workers and other friends.
