= Knockbracken Healthcare Park =

- Belfast Health and Social Care Trust
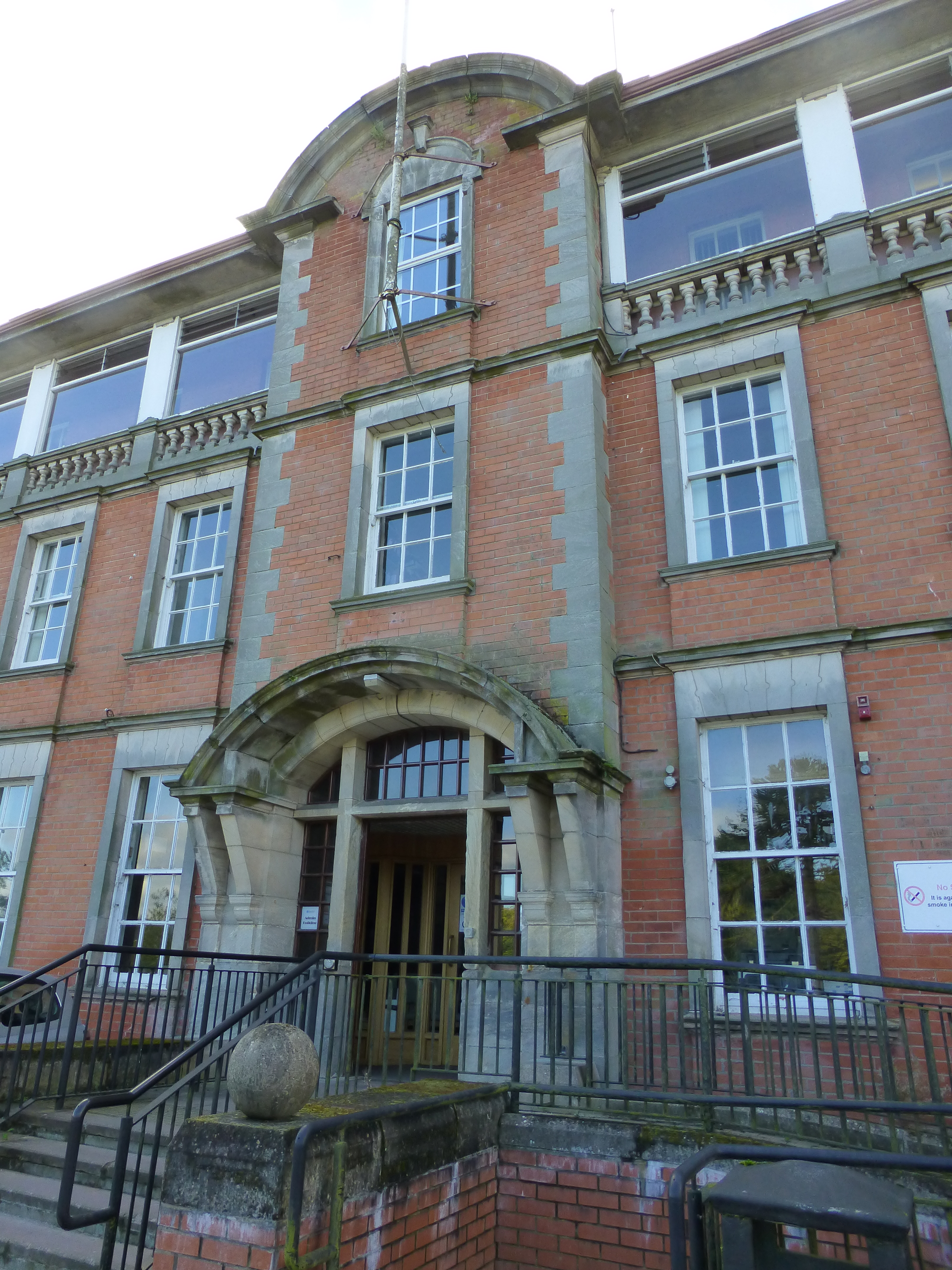
- Knockbracken Healthcare Park

- Location in Northern Ireland

Geography
- Location: Saintfield Road, Belfast, Northern Ireland
- Coordinates: 54.5393°N 5.9063°W

Organisation
- Care system: Health and Social Care in Northern Ireland
- Type: Specialist

Services
- Speciality: Mental health

History
- Founded: 1829

Links
- Website: https://belfasttrust.hscni.net/hospitals/knockbracken/

The Knockbracken Healthcare Park is a mental health facility based on the Saintfield Road, Belfast, Northern Ireland. It is managed by the Belfast Health and Social Care Trust.

== History ==
The facility was commissioned to replace the old Belfast Asylum on Grosvenor Road. It was decided to acquire Purdysburn House, an early 19th century house designed by Thomas Hopper for Narcissus Batt, a banker, and its extensive grounds. The new mental health facilities, known as Purdysburn Villa Colony, were designed by George Thomas Hine and Tulloch and Fitzsimmons with the first four new villas being built on the eastern part of the site in 1906 and a further six villas, together with recreation hall, administration block and churches, being built in a similar location in 1913. It joined the Health and Social Care (Northern Ireland) system as Purdysburn Hospital in 1948 and subsequently evolved to become Knockbracken Healthcare Park.

Purdysburn House itself, which had been built on the western part of the site, was demolished in 1965 and HM Prison Hydebank Wood was built in that location in 1979.
