= Kathleen Robb =

Northern Ireland nurse (1923–2020)

Mary Kathleen Robb OBE, OStJ, FRCN
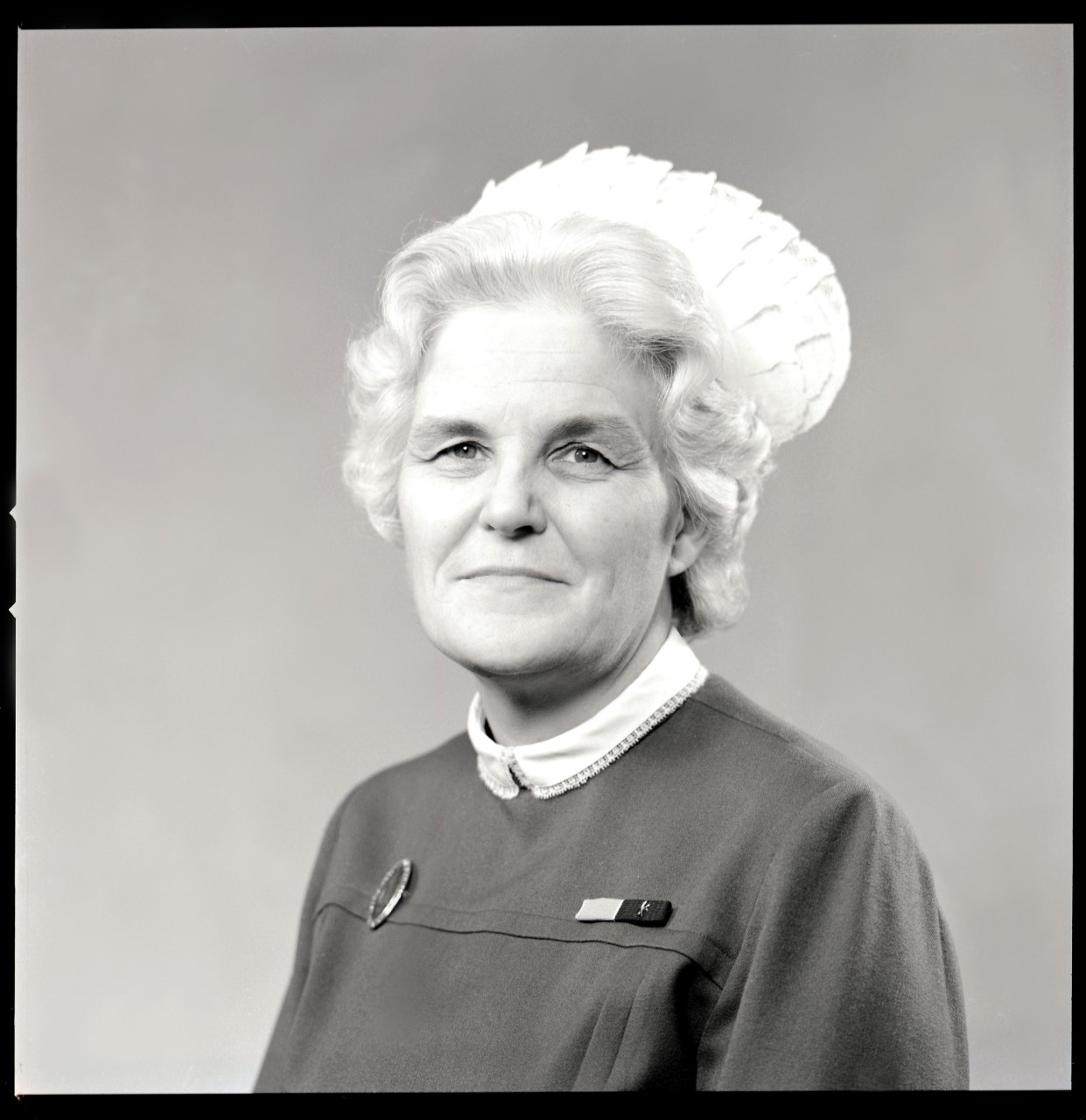
- Born: 11 September 1923; Belfast
- Died: 7 November 2020 (aged 97); Belfast
- Education: Belfast Hospital for Sick Children Royal Victoria Hospital Robert Jones Agnes Hunt Orthopaedic Hospital in Oswestry Western General Hospital in Edinburgh
- Occupation(s): Children's Nurse General Nurse Sister of Fracture Clinic Matron of City Hospital, Tower Hill Hospital and Royal Victoria Hospital Nurse Planning Officer District Administrative Nursing Officer
- Board member of: The Royal College of Nursing

Mary Kathleen Robb, OBE, OStJ, FRCN (11 September 1923 – 7 November 2020), was a nurse from Northern Ireland. Robb was the last matron of the Royal Victoria Hospital in Belfast and steered nursing services across the city during the height of The Troubles. Robb was an advocate for the Royal College of Nursing (RCN) and was a board member for 20 years.

== Early life and education ==
Mary Kathleen Robb was born in Belfast in 1923. She attended Princess Gardens school. Robb commenced her training in 1941 as a children's nurse at the Belfast Hospital for Sick Children as she was considered too young to be an adult's nurse. Robb later moved to the Royal Victoria Hospital in Belfast to complete her training. Kathleen Robb also trained at Robert Jones, Agnes Hunt, Orthopaedic Hospital in Oswestry, and obtained a midwifery qualification at Western General Hospital in Edinburgh.

== Career ==
After completing her orthopaedic training in England, Kathleen Robb became the sister at the Royal Victoria Hospital Belfast fracture clinic.

Following further training, Robb became Matron at the City Hospital and Tower Hill Hospital in Armagh. She then worked as a nurse planning officer.

In 1966, Robb became Matron of the Royal Victoria Hospital in Belfast. The Northern Ireland troubles began soon afterwards, making her job more difficult. The Royal Victoria Hospital was a key place for the treatment of victims of conflict and for the victims of outbreaks of rioting.

Robb was a member of the Royal Victoria Nurses League and was elected as acting president in 1967, as her colleague Florence Elliot was moving to Australia. Robb served as a Board Member of the RCN for 20 years, some time of which was spent as Board Chair. Robb was the RCN's National Council member for Northern Ireland.

Robb served on many hospital authorities and government committees. She was a member of the Northern Ireland Council for nurses and midwives. Robb's work had on an international dimension and she furthered her knowledge in Canada, the United States, Israel, and Finland.

In 1973, Robb was promoted to District Administrative Nursing Officer (DANO) for the North and West Belfast District of the Eastern Health and Social Services Board, one of the most deprived areas of Northern Ireland. Her work brought together hospital services with community nursing. Robb continued to be affiliated with the Royal Victoria Hospital Belfast during this time.

== Awards ==
- In 1970 Kathleen Robb became Officer Sister of the Order of St John of Jerusalem for her work throughout the Northern Ireland troubles.
- Robb was awarded an OBE in 1973 for the Queen's Birthday Honours.
- In 1977, Robb became a Fellow of the Royal College of Nursing (FRCN), a year after the fellowships were first introduced. She was the first nurse in Northern Ireland to receive this honour.
- In 2003, Robb received the RCN Lifetime Achievement Award.
- In 2016 Robb received the Freedom of the City of Belfast. This was awarded to Robb on behalf of the nursing profession for service to the people of Belfast during the Troubles.

== Retirement and legacy ==
After Robb's retirement in 1984, she remained active in supporting the nursing profession and was one of the founders of the History of Nursing Network of the RCN. Robb remained active in this position for many years.

She was a governor of the Methodist College Belfast for 10 years and served on the Methodist Church council on social responsibility.
