= Belfast Union Workhouse =

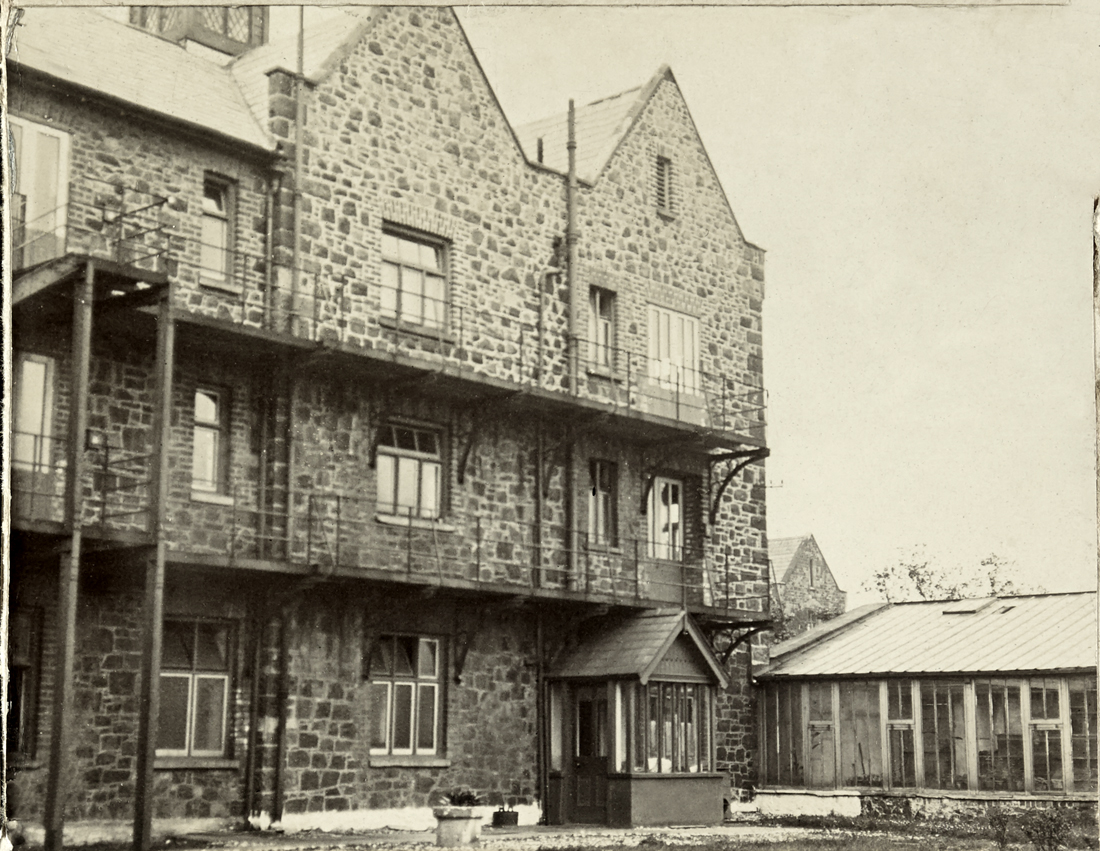
Photo of Belfast Union Workhouse, 1909

Belfast Union Workhouse was a workhouse operated by Belfast Poor Law Union to provide statutory relief to the destitute in Belfast and the surrounding townlands allocated to it. The workhouse operated from 1841 to 1948, overseen by a Board of Guardians.

Conditions were harsh, with long working hours and minimal food, partly to act as a deterrent to entry. It enforced strict segregation by age, gender, and capability; families who entered together were often separated. Despite various medical provisions including hospitals, there were high mortality rates during disease outbreaks. Conditions were cramped. By the 1901 census, the workhouse complex housed 3,359 "inmates" as well as 166 officials and their family members.

== History ==
Belfast Union Workhouse was established along with the Poor Law Union under the Poor Relief (Ireland) Act 1838 (1 & 2 Vict. c. 56). The buildings on Lisburn Road in Belfast were designed by George Wilkinson, who, having designed many workhouses in England, had now become the architect for the Poor Law Commission in Ireland. It opened in 1841 with an initial capacity of 1,000 inmates, making it one of the earliest and largest in the new workhouse system in Ireland.

The workhouse population grew quickly from 1845 due the effects of the Great Famine, and the workhouse adapted to accommodate an additional 747 people. Belfast was rapidly expanding, which put continued strain on the workhouse: there were around 15,000 admissions during 1870, which had risen to over 29,000 in 1913. Many of these were repeat admissions.

The workhouse was a large complex, with various facilities added over time. The original construction consisted of an administrative block, a central of block dormitories with school rooms, day rooms and food service and kitchen room, and a rear block housing the infirmary. A new fever hospital for 159 patients was opened on the site in 1847, where flushing toilets were installed in 1853, initially one for every 65 patients. In 1848, a residential school with 1,300 places had been built, which in 1869 was converted into the new Belfast Union Workhouse Infirmary. A smaller, replacement school was built behind it in 1874, which later became Windsor Hospital in 1923.

=== Belfast Union Workhouse Infirmary ===
The infirmary had just ten beds when the workhouse opened in 1841, which the Board of Guardians increased to 100 despite protests from the Poor Law Commissioners in Dublin. In 1847, Dr. Seaton Reid was appointed head physician at the fever hospital. A respected expert on fevers, he wrote to the Guardians urging them to provide a larger infirmary accommodation, citing not only the "most offensive" smell, but also that the patients were "so many huddled together" that trying to provide proper medical attention in the existing conditions was "utterly fruitless". He also petitioned for nurses to be employed. The fever hospital, operating under the Infirmary, was eventually given responsibility for all cases of fever in Belfast.

Destitute pregnant women were first accommodated in a lying-in ward in the infirmary, then from 1892 in the designated maternity block, Ivy Cottage. A nurses' home was also built in 1892. In 1900, two wings were added to the infirmary. It was used to treat soldiers during World War I, and in World War II it became a treatment center for civilians injured in air raids.

== Closure ==
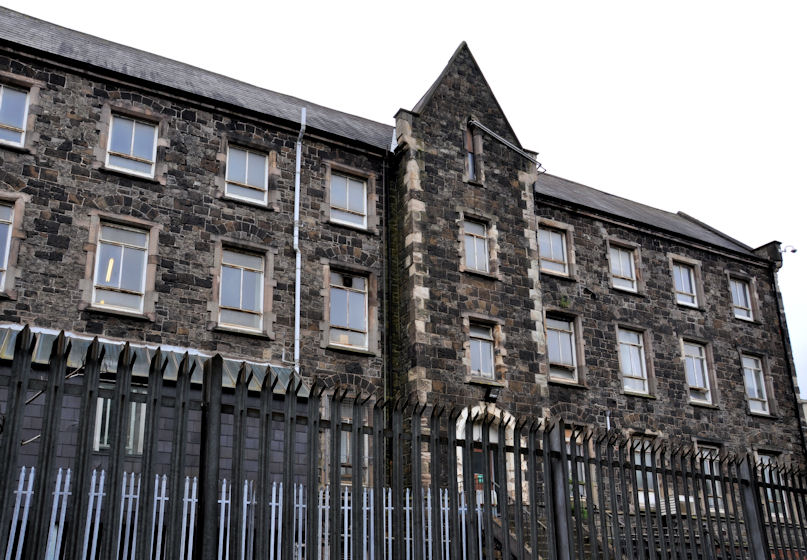
The former fever hospital, now part of Belfast City Hospital

Control of the hospitals passed to the National Health Service upon its establishment of in 1948, and the Board of Guardians of the Workhouse was dissolved in the same year. Improved social support for the unemployed meant the workhouse was in much lower demand. The workhouse was retained by welfare authorities and used as a hostel after 1948. Much of the original building complex was integrated into the Belfast City Hospital grounds, where only some structures remain today.

== See also ==
- Irish Poor Laws
- Ella Pirrie, former head nurse of the infirmary
