= Royal Jubilee Maternity Hospital =

- Belfast Health and Social Care Trust
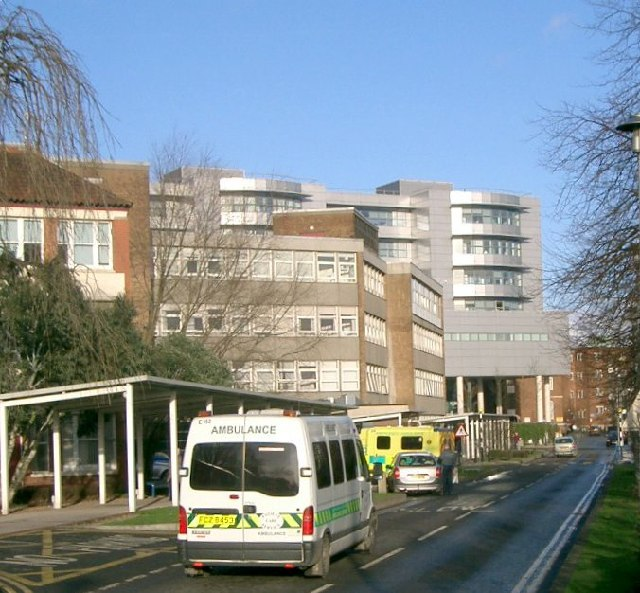
- Royal Jubilee Maternity Hospital (the middle red brick building on the left)

- Location in Northern Ireland

Geography
- Location: Grosvenor Road, Belfast, Northern Ireland
- Coordinates: 54.5936°N 5.9547°W

Organisation
- Care system: Health and Social Care in Northern Ireland
- Type: Specialist

Services
- Speciality: Maternity

History
- Founded: 1794; 232 years ago

Links
- Website: www.belfasttrust.hscni.net/hospitals/RoyalMaternity.htm

The Royal Jubilee Maternity Hospital is a maternity hospital in Grosvenor Road, Belfast, Northern Ireland. It is managed by the Belfast Health and Social Care Trust.

== History ==
The facility has its origins in a private house in Donegall Street where a lying-in hospital was established in 1794. It moved to larger premises in Townsend Street in November 1904. The current facility was built on a site previously occupied by the Belfast Asylum, to the immediate south of the Royal Victoria Hospital. It was officially opened by Lucy Baldwin in October 1933. It joined the National Health Service in 1948. After services were transferred from the Jubilee Maternity Hospital, which had been the maternity unit at the Belfast City Hospital, in May 2000, the facility at Grosvenor Road was renamed the Royal Jubilee Maternity Hospital.
