= Belfast City Hospital =

University teaching hospital in Northern Ireland

- Belfast Health and Social Care Trust
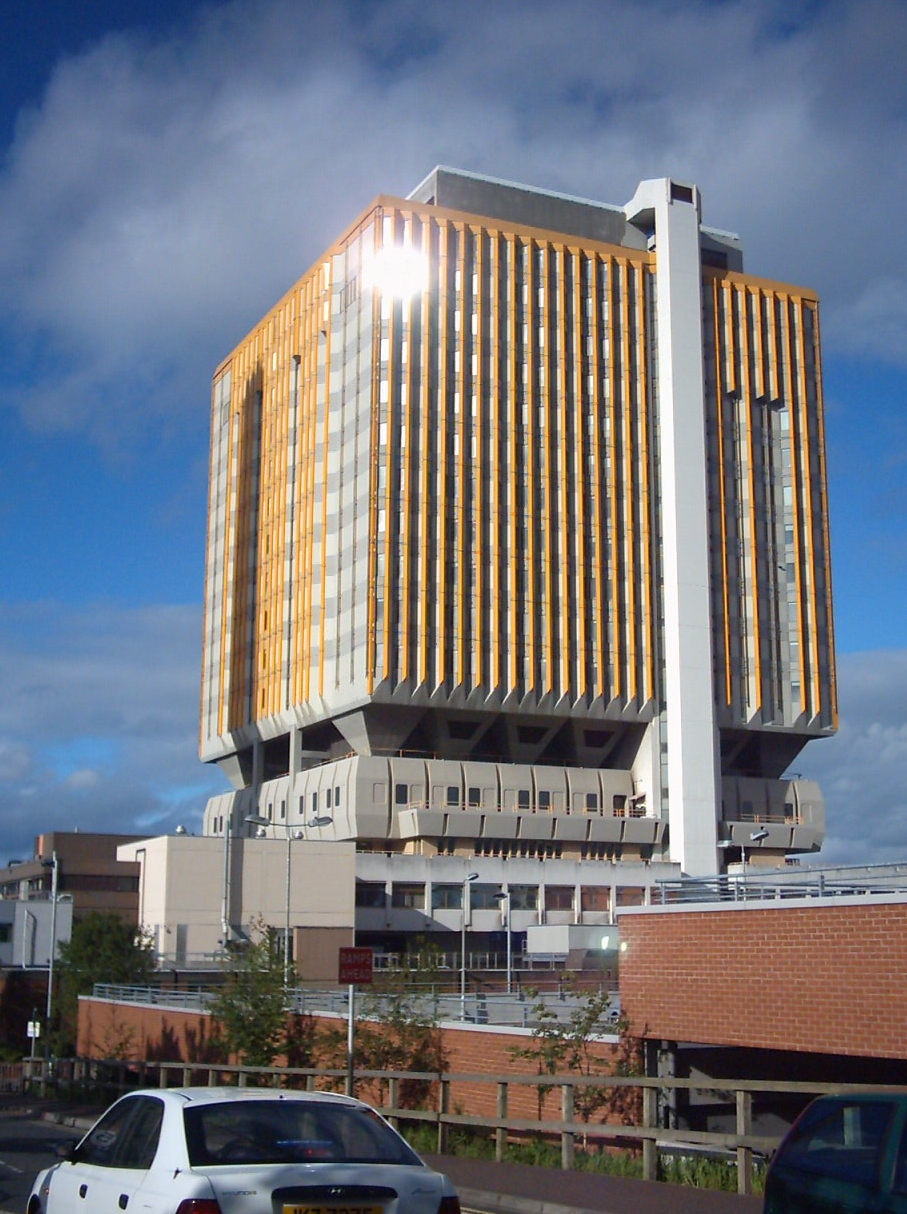
- The tower at Belfast City Hospital

- Location in Northern Ireland

Geography
- Location: Lisburn Road, Belfast, Northern Ireland
- Coordinates: 54°35′15″N 5°56′27″W

Organisation
- Care system: Health and Social Care in Northern Ireland
- Type: District General
- Affiliated university: Queen's University Belfast; Ulster University

Services
- Emergency department: No
- Beds: 900

History
- Founded: 1841

Links
- Website: belfasttrust.hscni.net/hospitals/bch/

The Belfast City Hospital in Belfast, Northern Ireland, is a 900-bed modern university teaching hospital providing local acute services and key regional specialities. Its distinctive yellow tower block dominates the Belfast skyline being the third tallest habitable storeyed building in Northern Ireland (after Windsor House and Obel Tower, both in Belfast). It has a focus on the development of regional cancer and renal services. It is managed by Belfast Health and Social Care Trust and is the largest general hospital in the United Kingdom. In April 2020, due to the global coronavirus pandemic, the tower block was designated one of the UK's Nightingale Hospitals.

== History ==
=== Origins ===
The hospital has its origins in the Belfast Union Workhouse and infirmary on the Lisburn Road which was designed by Charles Lanyon and opened on 1 January 1841. The infirmary was intended for the poor who did not have access to healthcare services provided by the government.

=== Workhouse Infirmary ===
As it became difficult to separate the sick from the destitute, the workhouse infirmary developed and soon had over 600 beds. The largest number of patients in the Belfast Union Infirmary was recorded as 4,252 on 31 January 1869.

=== Dr. Thomas Andrews ===
Dr. Thomas Andrews, who qualified as a doctor in Edinburgh in 1835, was appointed by the Guardians at the age of 26 to work with the growing patient population and paid him £60 per annum. Belfast grew to a city of 350,000 people in Victorian times but the city had a problem with poor housing and sewage which led to at least four Cholera outbreaks. In January 1847 a new fever hospital with 159 beds was opened by the Board of Guardians on the site.

=== Fever hospital ===
In 1849 all fever patients were removed from the wards of the Frederick Street Hospital and transferred to the new fever hospital. This decision meant reduced bed numbers in the main Belfast General Hospital but that the amount of surgery now done there increased. The fever hospital treated outbreaks of cholera, smallpox, tuberculosis, measles, diphtheria, typhoid, scarlet fever and rabies. In addition to the "fever" patients, the infirmary also agreed to take all patients with burns, and those with incurable illnesses to the point where they were as many as 1,338 patients in 1883.

=== Expansion ===
The number of nurses grew over these years although they were often untrained. In 1867, there were fifteen paid nurses. In November 1884, Miss Ella Pirrie was appointed Superintendent and Head Nurse. She knew Florence Nightingale and in December 1884, Miss Nightingale sent a Christmas present to Miss Pirrie for the children in the Infirmary. Shortly after she was appointed, the Guardians approved a uniform for the paid nurses, and a distinctive apron for the unpaid female attendants. Under Miss Pirrie, nursing training began for the first time in Belfast and the first person, Miss Craig was sent to Dublin to sit a nursing examination. Nurse Craig was appointed Superintendent in 1892. The maternity unit was first established on the site by Dr. John McLeish in the late 19th century and then expanded to become the Jubilee Maternity Hospital, moving into new purpose-built premises on the site in 1935.

The National Health Service was created in 1948, and three of the hospital's laboratory assistants were among the last 45 of the workhouse residents to serve on the hospital staff. Having been orphaned and with no record of their parents, they were known as Pauper John, Skipper and Red Hand Rufus.

In the late 1960s, Dimitrios Oreopoulos, a Greek-born doctor at the hospital, arranged to have seeds from the Tree of Hippocrates in Kos planted on the hospital grounds to commemorate the proposed expansion of the hospital. One of the trees created from the seeds, in the grounds of Erskine House, became too large to transplant to the tower building and was left in place. The tree, which remains surrounded by modern developments and is described as "an oasis of calm and a symbol of hope for patients, staff and students", was named Northern Ireland's Tree of the Year for 2017 in a public vote.

The tower block, which is 15 storeys and 76 m (250 ft) high, was designed by Louis Adair Roche and opened in January 1986.

Maternity services transferred to the Royal Maternity Hospital and the Jubilee Maternity Hospital, which had been based on the Belfast City Hospital site, closed in May 2000.

In February 2003 the hospital was designated as one of the nine acute hospitals in the acute hospital network of Northern Ireland on which healthcare would be focused under the government health policy 'Developing Better Services'. An oncology centre, with four wards and a total of 72 beds, opened in March 2006.

The Accident and Emergency Department closed in 2011 due to financial and recruitment difficulties: the trust directed patients and ambulances to go to either the Royal Victoria Hospital or the Mater Infirmorum Hospital for emergency treatment instead.

== Teaching ==
The hospital provides clinical placements for medical students from Queen's University Belfast.

== COVID-19 pandemic ==
In April 2020, due to the global coronavirus pandemic, the tower block was designated one of the UK's Nightingale Hospitals.
