= Belfast Health and Social Care Trust =

State health organisation in Northern Ireland

- Type: Health and social care trust
- Established: 1 April 2007
- Headquarters: 51 Lisburn Road; Belfast; BT9 7AB
- Hospitals: Belfast City Hospital; Forster Green Hospital; Knockbracken Healthcare Park; Mater Infirmorum Hospital; Muckamore Abbey Hospital; Musgrave Park Hospital; Royal Belfast Hospital for Sick Children; Royal Jubilee Maternity Hospital; Royal Victoria Hospital
- Staff: 19,732 (2018/19)
- Website: belfasttrust.hscni.net

The Belfast Health and Social Care Trust (BHSCT) is a health organisation covering Belfast, Northern Ireland. The trust is one of five new trusts which were created on 1 April 2007 by the then Department of Health, Social Services and Public Safety (DHSSPS). The Belfast Trust employs 22,000 staff. It has responsibility for services to over 340,000 patients, provided at various hospitals including Belfast City Hospital, the Royal Victoria Hospital, the Mater Hospital and Musgrave Park Hospital.

== History ==
The trust was established as the Belfast Health and Social Services Trust on 1 August 2006, and became operational on 1 April 2007.

== Population ==
The area covered by Belfast Health and Social Care Trust has a population of 348,204 residents according to the 2011 Northern Ireland census.

== Services ==
The trust opened a new supported housing scheme called Hemsworth Court costing £5 million with 35 apartments which aims to maintain the independence of people with dementia on Shankill Road in March 2015.

The Duke of Connaught Unit, located within Musgrave Park Hospital, was opened in October 2022. It provides orthopaedic services for patients who do not need overnight stays.

== Performance ==
In March 2016 the waiting time for routine spinal appointments was 110 weeks rising in four-weekly increments each month because capacity in Musgrave Park Hospital spinal service does not meet the current demand for services.

In April 2017 waiting time for paediatric ear surgery was around 30 weeks. In April 2022 there were 4,287 children who had been waiting a year or more for a first consultant led outpatient appointment.

According to Stephen McCarroll, owner of Surgical Systems Ireland, and an independent candidate in the 2016 Northern Ireland Assembly election, the trust reorganised its finance department in January 2009 and suppliers’ bills were not paid on time.
