= Belfast Asylum =

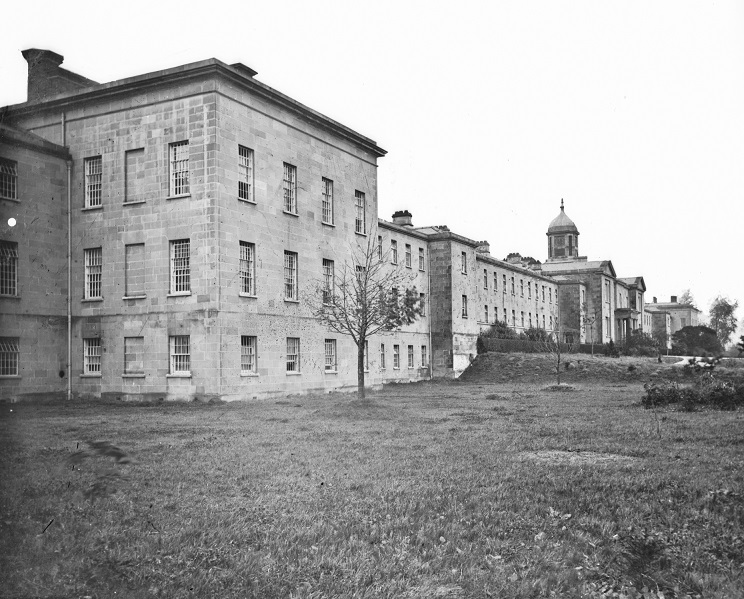
- Belfast Asylum

- Shown in Northern Ireland

Geography
- Location: Belfast, Northern Ireland
- Coordinates: 54.59367°N 5.95461°W

Organisation
- Type: Specialist

Services
- Speciality: Psychiatric hospital

History
- Founded: 1829
- Closed: 1919

Belfast Asylum (Irish: Tearmann Bhéal Feirste) was a psychiatric hospital on the Falls Road in Belfast, Northern Ireland.

== History ==
The hospital, which was designed by Francis Johnston and William Murphy, opened as the Belfast Asylum in 1829. In an important legal case in the mid nineteenth century, the governors of the asylum argued that compulsory religious education of the insane was unwise and successfully persuaded the courts that the Lord Lieutenant of Ireland should not be allowed to appoint chaplains to the asylum. After services transferred to the new Purdysburn Villa Colony, Belfast Asylum closed in 1913. The asylum building was converted for use as the Belfast War Hospital in July 1917 during the First World War. The War Office closed the war facility in winter 1919. In the late 1920s the buildings were demolished and the site cleared to make way for the Royal Maternity Hospital.
