= Royal Victoria Hospital, Belfast =

Royal Victoria Hospital
- Belfast Health and Social Care Trust
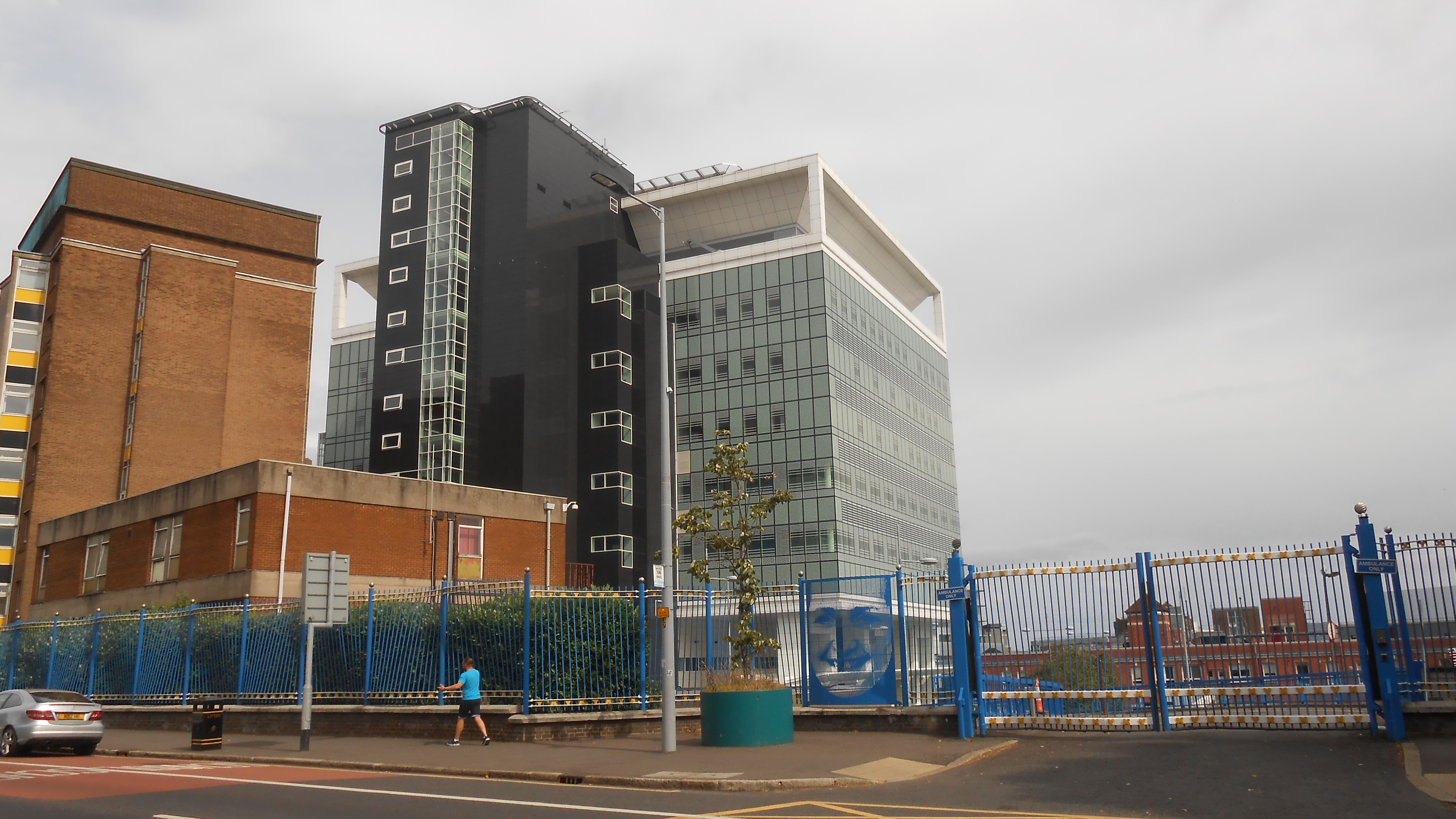
- Royal Victoria Hospital

- Location in Northern Ireland

Geography
- Location: 274 Grosvenor Road, Belfast, Northern Ireland
- Coordinates: 54.5947°N 5.9538°W

Organisation
- Care system: Health and Social Care
- Type: District General
- Affiliated university: Queen's University Belfast; Ulster University

Services
- Emergency department: Yes Major Trauma Centre
- Beds: 723

History
- Founded: 1797

Links
- Website: belfasttrust.hscni.net/hospitals/rvh/

The Royal Victoria Hospital commonly known as "the Royal", the "RVH" or "the Royal Belfast", is a hospital in Belfast, Northern Ireland. It is managed by the Belfast Health and Social Care Trust. The hospital has a Regional Virus Centre, which is one of the four laboratories in the United Kingdom on the World Health Organization (WHO) list of laboratories able to perform PCR for rapid diagnosis of influenza A (H1N1) virus infection in humans.

== History ==
=== Early history ===
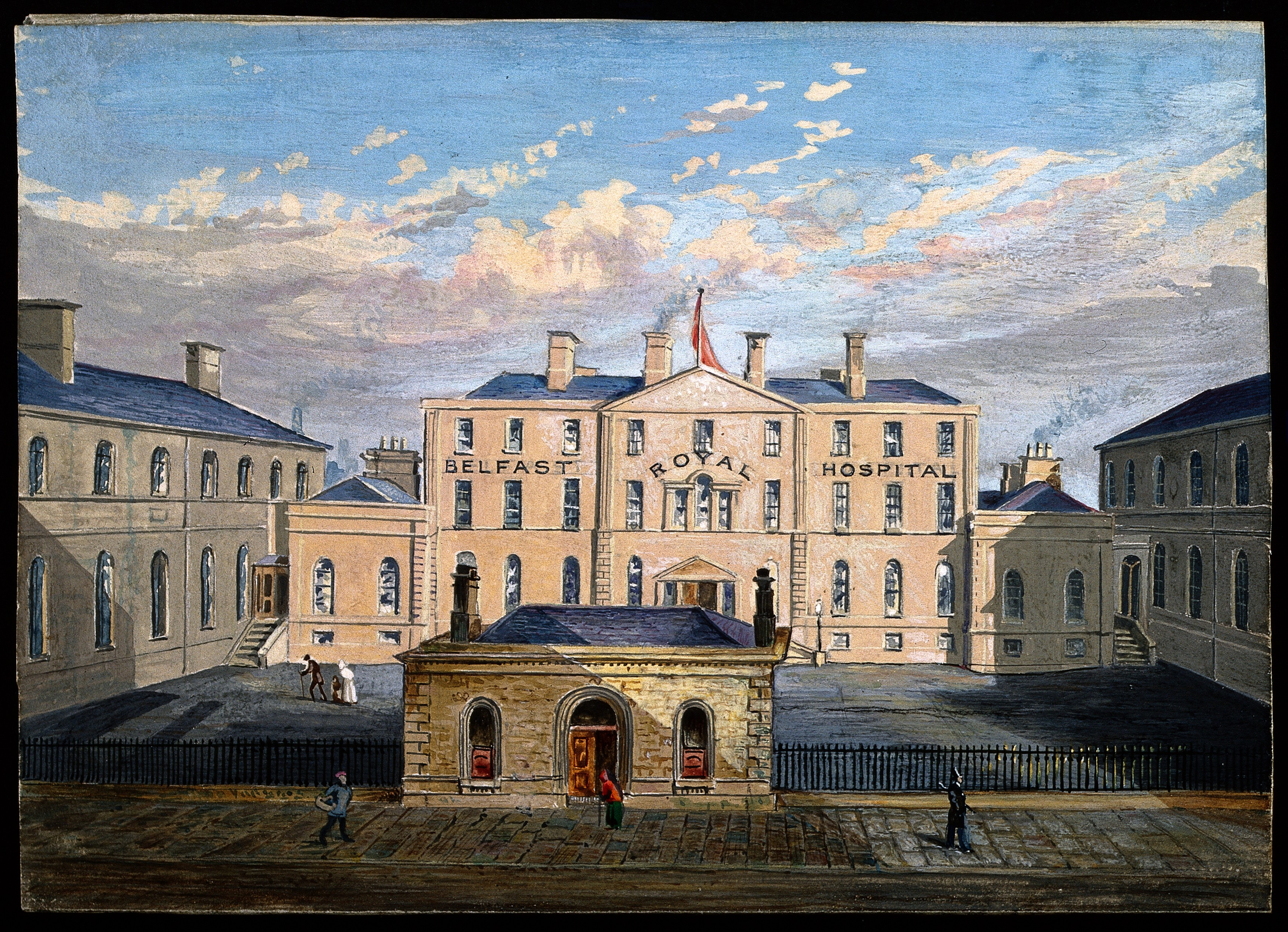
The Frederick Street Hospital

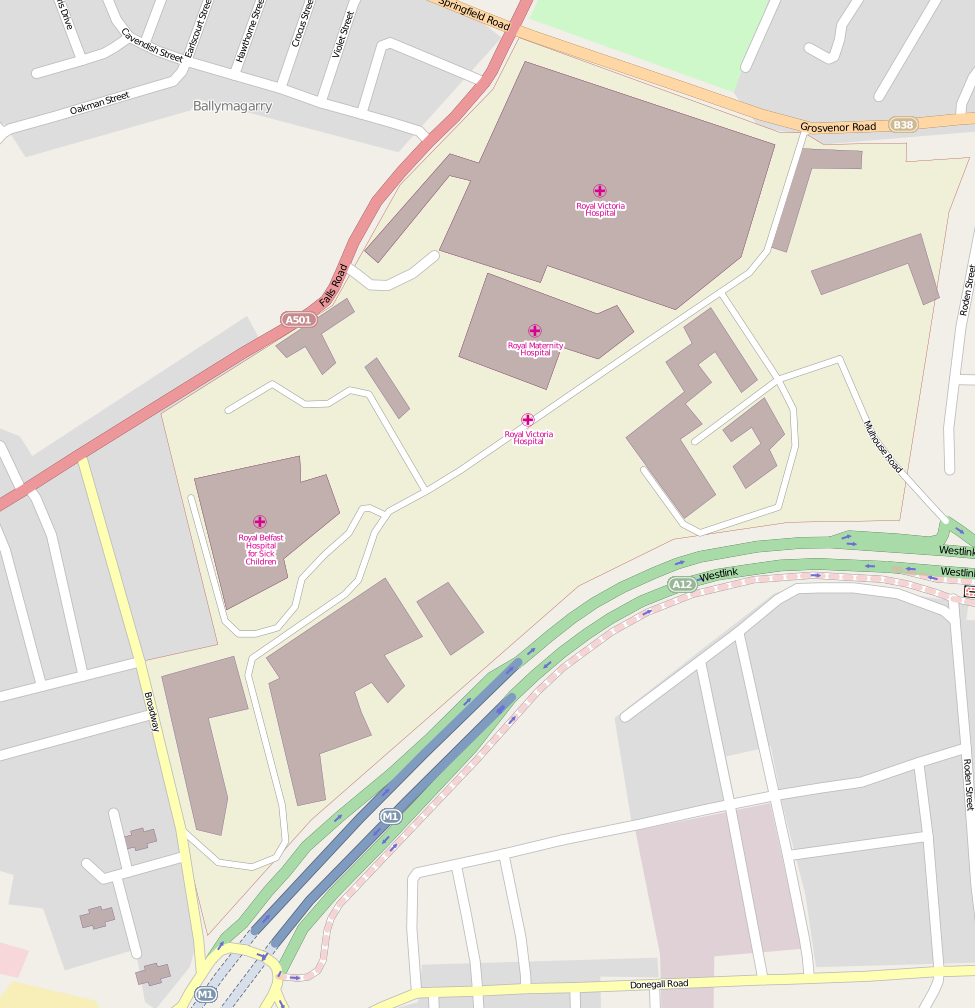
Map of the various buildings in the hospital complex.

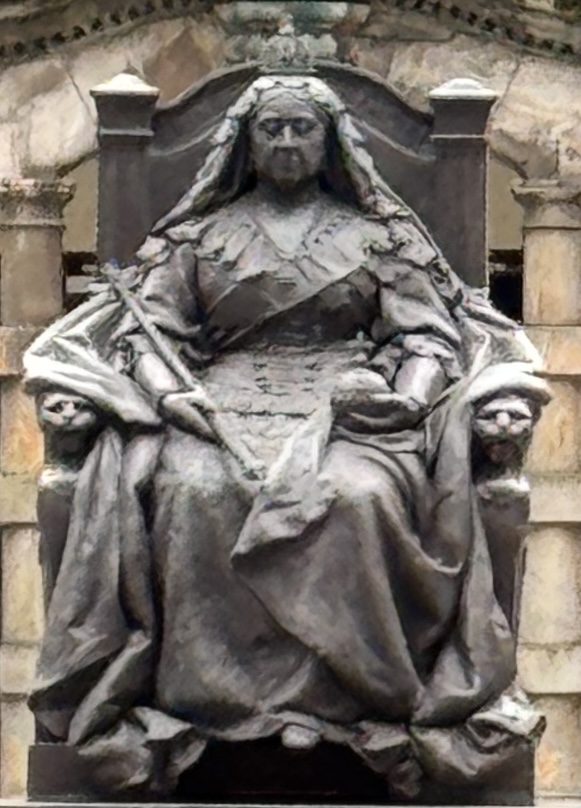
Statue of Queen Victoria at the Royal Victoria Hospital, Belfast

The Royal Victoria Hospital has its origins in a number of successive institutions, beginning in 1797 with The Belfast Fever Hospital and General Dispensary, located in Factory Row (although the dispensary originally opened in 1792). This moved to West Street in 1799, and then to Frederick Street in 1817. In 1847 the hospital separated from the General Dispensary and became the Belfast General Hospital. In 1875 it gained the royal charter, becoming the Belfast Royal Hospital, and in 1899 it was renamed the Royal Victoria Hospital. In 1903 it moved from Frederick Street to its present (Grosvenor Road) site.

=== Grosvenor Road ===
The first hospital building on the Grosvenor Road site was designed in 1899 by architects Henman and Cooper of Birmingham in a partial adoption of the English Revival style. The design incorporates a turreted verandah-balcony extending along a series of ward pavilions. The hospital became the first air-conditioned public building in the world when Belfast's Sirocco Works installed the system. It was officially opened by King Edward VII and Queen Alexandra on 27 July 1903. The King Edward Building, built to commemorate the life of the late king, was completed in 1915. The Royal Maternity Hospital was officially opened on the site previously occupied by the Belfast Asylum, to the immediate south of the main hospital, in 1933. Later additions included a free-standing radiology department and theatre block in 1964.

=== Pioneering developments ===
On 1 March 1960, the first open heart cardiac surgery in Northern Ireland was performed at the hospital by Tom Smiley, John Bingham and Morris Stevenson using a Melrose heart machine funded at a cost of £1,600 by the Working Mens Committee.

=== Recent history ===
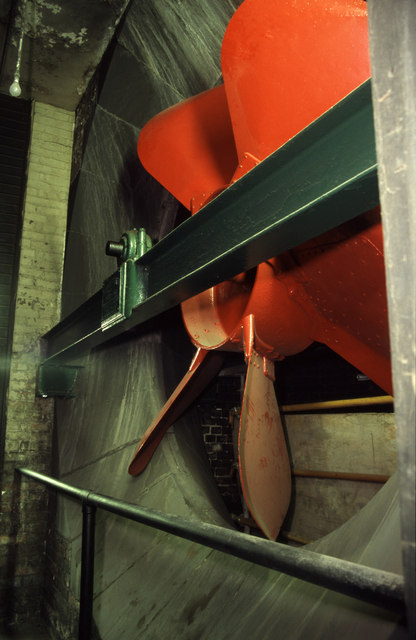
Part of the original ventilation system.

A slight addition to the main front of the West Belfast site was new railings (on Falls Road, going west from the junction of Grosvenor and Springfield Roads) completed in 2000. The wavy pattern of the railings erected was reminiscent of the structure of DNA. There were little yellow Xs and Ys detailed for X- and Y-chromosomes, and portraits (laser-cut in sheet steel) chart the progress of a human life from birth to the age of 100.

In February 2003 the hospital was designated as one of the nine acute hospitals in the acute hospital network of Northern Ireland on which healthcare would be focused under the government health policy 'Developing Better Services'.

The Prince of Wales (later King Charles III) opened a new 400 bed, seven storey building which incorporated new intensive care and fracture units built at a cost of £42 million, in September 2003. New imaging and central decontamination centres were added in 2007.

Construction started on a new critical care facility, being built at a cost of £150 million, in 2008. However, due to construction difficulties, the project was understood to be running at least eight years late, and it was announced in October 2020 that the opening would be delayed indefinitely.

In April 2026, a man in his 30s died after a fire broke out in the toilets of the hospital's emergency department.

== Staff and patients ==
Frank Pantridge, the "father of emergency medicine", was a cardiac consultant at the hospital for over 30 years. During his time at the Royal, Pantridge developed the portable defibrillator, which revolutionised emergency medicine by allowing patients to be treated early by paramedics.

Progressive Unionist Party (PUP) politician David Ervine was admitted on 7 January 2007 and died there the following day. During the Northern Ireland Troubles, the hospital was regarded as one of the best hospitals in the world for the treatment of gunshot wounds. Gunshots to the knee (associated with paramilitary punishment attacks in Northern Ireland) enabled surgeons at the hospital to gain renown with their treatment of such injuries.

== Matrons ==
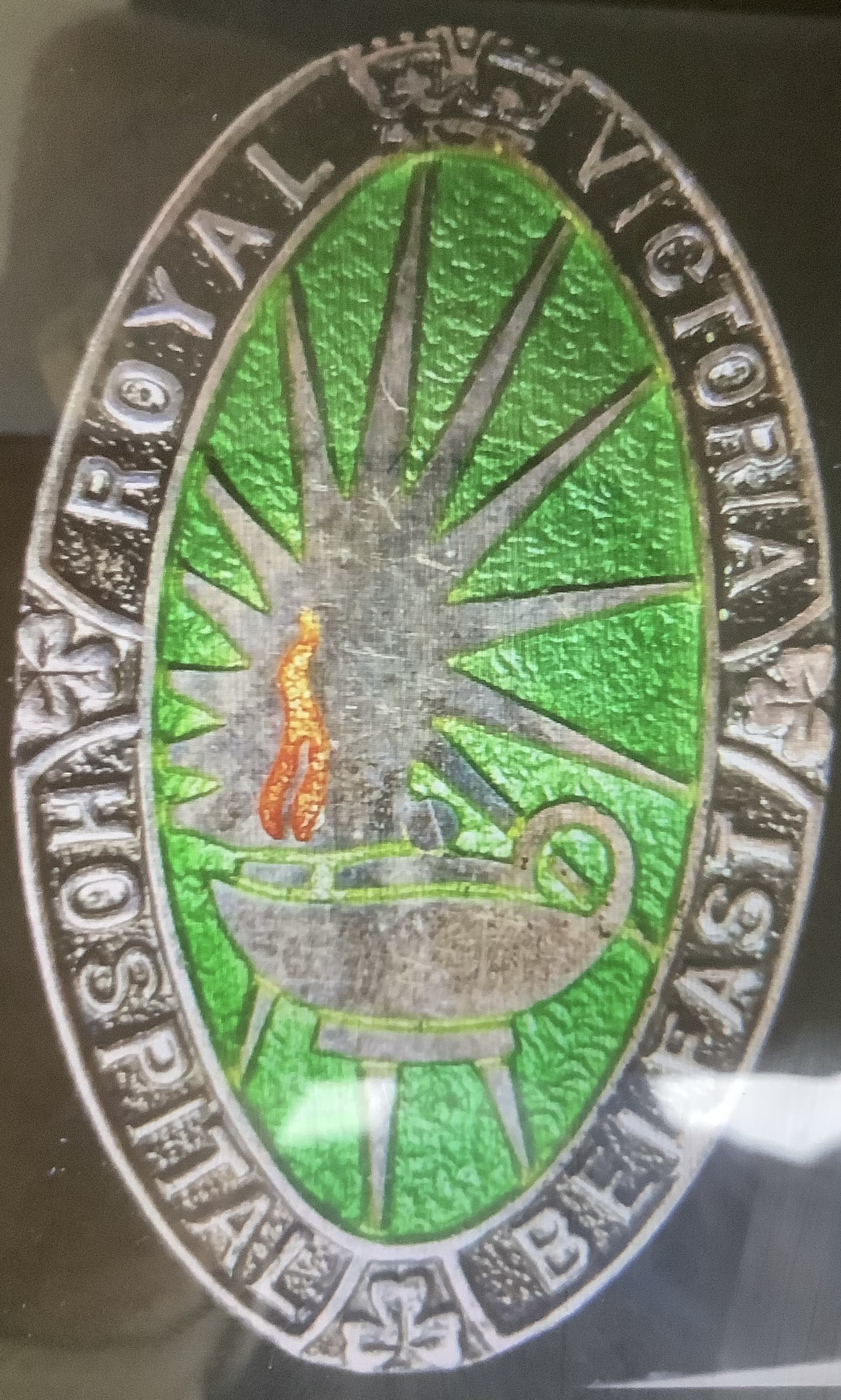
Badge designed by Rosamond Praeger

Hospital matrons from 1903 to 1973 following the opening of the hospital on the Grosvenor Road have been as follows:

- 1901–1922 Mary Frances Bostock: she oversaw the move of the hospital from its original site in Frederick Street. Bostock remained in the position of matron until her retirement in 1922.
- 1922–1946 Anne Elizabeth Musson: came to the RVH as Assistant Matron in 1919 becoming Matron in 1922, a position she held until retirement in 1946. In 1931 Musson asked if a nurses badge could be commissioned for qualifying staff. A green and silver oval badge was designed by the well known sculptor, Rosamond Praeger.
- 1946–1966 Florence Eileen Elliott: was the first RVH trained nurse to be appointed Matron. Born in Randalstown (1905) she trained 1927–1930. Elliott trained as a midwife in Edinburgh and five years after this was appointed Matron to Whiteabbey Sanitorium (1943). She was an active member of the Royal College of Nursing, and the Joint Nursing and Midwives'Council. For services to nursing Elliott was awarded and OBE (1951) and an honorary MA by Queen's University Belfast which for many years held an annual Florence Elliott Lecture. In retirement she was an active member of the Royal Victoria League of Nurses. Elliott died in 1996.
- 1966–1973 Mary Kathleen Robb: last matron of the hospital. She steered the hospital through the first years of The Troubles.

== Performance ==
In November 2013 it was reported that the Royal College of Emergency Medicine considered that issues faced by clinicians in the casualty department are probably worse than anywhere else in the UK.

The Royal Victoria Hospital has, in recent years, been criticised by health professionals due to its long waiting time at Accident and Emergency; this has resulted in patients and emergency ambulances being delayed and having to queue outside the hospital for hours at a time.
