= List of statutory instruments of the United Kingdom, 2020 =

This is a list of statutory instruments made in the United Kingdom in 2020.

== 1–100 ==
Number	Title
1	Police Appeals Tribunals Rules 2020
2	The Police (Complaints and Misconduct) Regulations 2020
3	The Police (Performance) Regulations 2020
4	The Police (Conduct) Regulations 2020
5 (C. 1)	The Policing and Crime Act 2017 (Commencement No. 10 and Transitional and Saving Provisions) Regulations 2020
6	The State Pension Revaluation for Transitional Pensions Order 2020
7	The State Pension Debits and credits (Revaluation) Order 2020
8	The Criminal Legal aid (General) (Amendment) Regulations 2020
9	The Plant Health etc. (Fees) (England) (Amendment) Regulations 2020
10	Not allocated
11	The Football Spectators (2020 UEFA European Championship Control Period) Order 2020
12 (W. 1)	The A494 Trunk road (Ewloe, Flintshire) (Temporary Prohibition of Pedestrians & Cyclists) Order 2020
13	The Air Navigation (Restriction of Flying) (Orsett, Essex) (Emergency) Regulations 2020
14	The Civil Enforcement of Parking Contraventions Designation Order 2020
15	The Serious Organised Crime and Police Act 2005 (Designated Sites) (Amendment) Order 2020
16 (W. 2)	The Council Tax Reduction Schemes (Prescribed Requirements and Default Scheme) (Wales) (Amendment) Regulations 2020
17	The Government Resources and Accounts Act 2000 (Estimates and Accounts) (Amendment) Order 2020
18	The Greenhouse Gas Emissions Trading Scheme (Amendment) Regulations 2020
19	The Air Navigation (Restriction of Flying) (Orsett, Essex) (Emergency) (Revocation) Regulations 2020
20	The Whole of Government Accounts (Designation of Bodies) Order 2020
21	The Council Tax (Demand Notices) (England) (Amendment) Regulations 2020
22	The Abergelli Gas Fired Generating Station (Correction) Order 2020
23	The Council Tax Reduction Schemes (Prescribed Requirements) (England) (Amendment) Regulations 2020
24 (C. 2)	The Courts and Tribunals (Judiciary and Functions of Staff) Act 2018 (Commencement) Regulations 2020
25	The International Tax Enforcement (Disclosable Arrangements) Regulations 2020
26 (C. 3)	The Stalking Protection Act 2019 (Commencement) Regulations 2020
27	The Rent Officers (Housing Benefit and Universal Credit Functions) (Amendment) Order 2020
28	The Public Lending Right Scheme 1982 (Commencement of Variation) Order 2020
29	The Child Trust Funds (Amendment) Regulations 2020
30	The Individual Savings Account (Amendment) Regulations 2020
31	The Homes and Communities Agency (Transfer of Property etc.) Regulations 2020
32 (L. 5)	The Criminal Procedure (Amendment) Rules 2020
33	The Administration of Estates Act 1925 (Fixed Net Sum) Order 2020
34 (W. 3)	The A4810 Steelworks Access Road (Queen's Way), (Llanwern, Newport) (Temporary Speed Limits and Clearway) Order 2020
35	The Safety of Sports Grounds (Designation) (Amendment) Order 2020
36	The Andrey Lugovoy and Dmitri Kovtun Freezing Order 2020
37 (W. 4)	The Education (Amendments Relating to the Intervals for Inspection of Education and Training) (Wales) Regulations 2020
38	The Overseas Production Orders and Requests for Interception (Designation of Agreement) Regulations 2020
39	The Air Navigation (Restriction of Flying) (Cheltenham Festival) Regulations 2020
40	The Carcinogens and Mutagens (Miscellaneous Amendments) Regulations 2020
41	The Countryside Stewardship (England) Regulations 2020
42	The Veterinary Surgeons and Veterinary Practitioners (Registration) (Amendment) Regulations Order of Council 2020
43	The Food for Specific Groups (Food for Special Medical Purposes for Infants, Infant formula and Follow-on Formula) (Information and Compositional Requirements) (Amendment etc.) (England) Regulations 2020
44 (W. 5)	The Official Controls (Animals, Feed and Food, Plant Health Fees etc.) (Wales) Regulations 2020
45 (C. 4)	The Parental Bereavement (Leave and Pay) Act 2018 (Commencement) Regulations 2020
46	The Education (Student Fees, Awards and Support etc.) (Amendment) Regulations 2020
47	The M6 Motorway (Junctions 2 to 4) (Variable Speed Limits) Regulations 2020
48	The Education (Student Fees, Awards and Support etc.) (Amendment) (No. 2) Regulations 2020
49	Not allocated
50 (W. 6)	The Representation of the People (Annual Canvass) (Amendment) (Wales) Regulations 2020
51	The Double Taxation Dispute Resolution (EU) Regulations 2020
52	The Veterinary Surgeons (Recognition of University Degree) (Surrey) Order of Council 2020
53 (W. 7)	The A40 Trunk Road (Llandeilo Roundabout to Glangwili Roundabout, Carmarthenshire) (Temporary Speed Restrictions & No Overtaking) Order 2020
54 (W. 8)	The A40 Trunk Road (Llandeilo to Carmarthen, Carmarthenshire) (Temporary Traffic Restriction & Prohibition) Order 2020
55 (W. 9)	The A470 Trunk Road (Bwlch y Garreg, east of Llangurig, Powys) (Temporary Prohibition of Vehicles, Cyclists & Pedestrians) Order 2020
56	The Financial Services (Consequential Amendments) Regulations 2020
57	Not allocated
58	The Merchant Shipping (Technical Requirements for Inland Waterway Vessels) (Amendment) Regulations 2020
59	The National Health Service (Charges to Overseas Visitors) (Amendment) Regulations 2020
60	The Halton (Electoral Changes) Order 2020
61	The Immigration (Citizens’ Rights Appeals) (EU Exit) Regulations 2020
62	The Rotherham (Electoral Changes) (Amendment) Order 2020
63	The Air Navigation (Restriction of Flying) (Old Warden) Regulations 2020
64	The Isle of Wight (Electoral Changes) Order 2020
65	The London Borough of Ealing (Electoral Changes) Order 2020
66	The London Borough of Brent (Electoral Changes) Order 2020
67	The Adult Skills (Specified Qualification in Information Technology) (Amendment) Regulations 2020
68	The M62 and M606 Motorways (Chain Bar Roundabout) (Car Share Lane) (Revocation) Regulations 2020
69 (W. 10)	The Plant Health etc. (Fees) (Wales) (Amendment) Regulations 2020
70 (C. 5)	The Digital Economy Act 2017 (Commencement No. 7) Regulations 2020
71	The London Borough of Hillingdon (Electoral Changes) Order 2020
72	The London Borough of Harrow (Electoral Changes) Order 2020
73	The Northumberland (Electoral Changes) Order 2020
74 (C. 6)	The European Union (Withdrawal) Act 2018 (Commencement No. 5, Transitional Provisions and Amendment) Regulations 2020
75 (C. 7)	The European Union (Withdrawal Agreement) Act 2020 (Commencement No. 1) Regulations 2020
76	Not allocated
77	The Immigration and Nationality (Fees) (Amendment) Regulations 2020
78	The Police (Conduct) (Amendment) Regulations 2020
79	The M23 Motorway (Junctions 8 to 10) (Variable Speed Limits) Regulations 2020
80	The Communications (Television Licensing) (Amendment) Regulations 2020
81	Not allocated
82 (L. 6)	The Civil Procedure (Amendment) Rules 2020
83	The School and Early Years Finance (England) Regulations 2020
84 (W. 12)	The M4 Motorway (Junction 23, Rogiet to the Wales/England Border, Monmouthshire) (Temporary Prohibition of Vehicles) Order 2020
85	The M62 Motorway (Junctions 10 to 12) and M602 Motorway (Junction 1) (Variable Speed Limits) Regulations 2020
86 (C. 8)	The Organ Donation (Deemed Consent) Act 2019 (Commencement No. 2) Regulations 2020
87	The Value Added Tax (Miscellaneous Amendments, Revocation and Transitional Provisions) (EU Exit) Regulations 2019 (Appointed Day No. 1) (EU Exit) Regulations 2020
88	The Income Tax (Pay As You Earn) (Amendment) Regulations 2020
89 (W. 13)	The Infant Formula and Follow-on Formula (Wales) Regulations 2020
90	The Financing, Management and Monitoring of Direct Payments to Farmers (Amendment) Regulations 2020
91	The Rules for Direct Payments to Farmers (Amendment) Regulations 2020
92 (W. 14)	The Food for Specific Groups (Information and Compositional Requirements) (Wales) (Amendment) Regulations 2020
93 (W. 15)	The European Union (Withdrawal Agreement) Act 2020 (Disapplication of the Deferral of Subordinate Legislation) (Wales) (EU Exit) Regulations 2020
94	The Merchant Shipping (Ship-to-Ship Transfers) Regulations 2020
95 (W. 16)	Landfill Disposals Tax (Tax Rates) (Wales) (Amendment) Regulations 2020
96	The Electricity and Gas (Internal Markets) Regulations 2020
97 (C. 10)	The Taxation (Cross-border Trade) Act 2018 (Appointed Day No. 7 and Transitory Provisions) (EU Exit) Regulations 2020
98	The Authorised Court Staff (Legal Advice Functions) Qualifications Regulations 2020
99	The Trade Remedies (Amendment) (EU Exit) Regulations 2020
100	The Courts and Tribunals (Judiciary and Functions of Staff) Act 2018 (Consequential, Transitional and Saving Provision) Regulations 2020

== 101–200 ==
Number	Title
101	The Pension Protection Fund and Occupational Pension Schemes (Levy Ceiling and Compensation Cap) Order 2020
102	The Employment and Support Allowance (Transitional Provisions) (Amendment) Regulations 2020
103	The Victims’ Payments Regulations 2020
104	The Common Agricultural Policy (Direct Payments to Farmers) (Miscellaneous Amendments) (Wales) Regulations 2020
105	The Air Navigation (Restriction of Flying) (Streatham) (Emergency) Regulations 2020
106	The Utilities Act 2000 (Amendment of Section 105) Order 2020
107 (W. 18)	The Fishguard to Bangor Trunk Road (A487) (New Dyfi Bridge and De-Trunking, Machynlleth) Order 2020
108	The Statutory Auditors and Third Country Auditors (Amendment) (EU Exit) Regulations 2020
109	The Trade in Animals and Related Products (Amendment) Regulations 2020
110 (W. 19)	The Local Authorities (Capital Finance and Accounting) (Wales) (Amendment) Regulations 2020
111	The Air Navigation (Restriction of Flying) (Streatham) (Emergency) (Revocation) Regulations 2020
112	The Care and Support (Charging and Assessment of Resources) (Amendment) Regulations 2020
113 (W. 20)	The National Health Service (Charges to Overseas Visitors) (Amendment) (Wales) Regulations 2020
114	The Network Rail (East West Rail) (Bicester to Bedford Improvements) Order 2020
115	The Carbon Accounting (Provision for 2018) Regulations 2020
116	The Electricity and Gas (Standards of Performance) (Suppliers) (Amendment) Regulations 2020
117	The Financial Services and Markets Act 2000 (Central Counterparties, Investment Exchanges, Prospectus and Benchmarks) (Amendment) Regulations 2020
118	The Land Registry Trading Fund (Revocation) Order 2020
119 (W. 21)	The National Park Authorities (Wales) (Amendment) Order 2020
120 (W. 22)	The Sustainable Drainage (Enforcement) (Wales) (Amendment) Order 2020
121	The A30 Chiverton to Carland Cross Development Consent Order 2020
122	The Street and Road Works (Amendments Relating to Electronic Communications) (England) Regulations 2020
123	The Local Government Pension Scheme (Buckinghamshire Structural Changes) (Amendment) Regulations 2020
124	The Local Government (Structural Changes) (Further Financial Provisions and Amendment) (Amendment) Regulations 2020
125	The Office of Communications (Provision of Information) Regulations 2020
126	The A282 Trunk Road (Dartford-Thurrock Crossing Charging Scheme) (Amendment) Order 2020
127	The Code of Practice for the Welfare of Pigs (Appointed Day and Revocation) (England) Order 2020
128 (W. 23)	The A477 Trunk Road (East Williamston to Amroth Road, east of Kilgetty, Pembrokeshire) (Temporary Speed Restrictions & No Overtaking) Order 2020
129	Health Protection (Coronavirus) Regulations 2020
130	The Electricity Supplier Obligations (Excluded Electricity) (Amendment) Regulations 2020
131 (W. 24)	The Care and Support (Charging) (Wales) and Land Registration Rules (Miscellaneous Amendments) Regulations 2020
132	The Diocese of Durham (Educational Endowments) (Venerable Bede Church of England School) Order 2020
133	The Council Tax and Non-Domestic Rating (Demand Notices) (England) (Amendment) Regulations 2020
134	The Police and Crime Commissioner Elections (Designation of Local Authorities) Order 2020
135 (L. 7)	The Family Procedure (Amendment) Rules 2020
136	The Police and Crime Commissioner Elections (Designation of Police Area Returning Officers) Order 2020
137	The First-tier Tribunal and Upper Tribunal (Chambers) (Amendment) Order 2020
138	The Personal Injuries (NHS Charges) (Amounts) (Amendment) Regulations 2020
139	The Elections (Policy Development Grants Scheme) (Amendment) Order 2020
140	The Access to the Countryside (Coastal Margin) (Walney Island) Order 2020
141	The Midland Metro (Birmingham Eastside Extension) Order 2020
142 (W. 25)	The Education (Student Support) (Miscellaneous Amendments) (Wales) Regulations 2020
143 (W. 26)	The Education (Student Finance) (Miscellaneous Amendments) (Wales) (No. 2) Regulations 2020
144	The Air Navigation (Restriction of Flying) (Commonwealth Day) Regulations 2020
145	The Air Navigation (Restriction of Flying) (Old Warden) (Amendment) Regulations 2020
146	The Energy Act 2004 (Assistance for Areas with High Distribution Costs) (Amendment) Order 2020
147	The Inspectors of Education, Children's Services and Skills Order 2020
148	The Education (Chief Inspector of Education and Training in Wales) Order 2020
149	The Communications (Isle of Man) Order 2020
150	The Naval, Military and Air forces Etc. (Disablement and Death) Service Pensions (Amendment) Order 2020
151	The Taxation of Income from Land (Non-residents) (Amendment) Regulations 2020
152	The Universal Credit (Work-Related Requirements) In Work Pilot Scheme (Extension) Order 2020
153 (W. 27)	The Education (Student Finance) (Amounts) (Miscellaneous Amendments) (Wales) Regulations 2020
154 (W. 28)	The Education (Student Finance) (Miscellaneous Amendments) (Wales) (No. 2) (Revocation) Regulations 2020
155 (C. 11)	The Youth Justice and Criminal Evidence Act 1999 (Commencement No. 17) Order 2020
156	The Northamptonshire (Structural Changes) Order 2020
157	The Criminal Justice and Courts Act 2015 (Consequential Amendment) Regulations 2020
158	The Release of Prisoners (Alteration of Relevant Proportion of Sentence) Order 2020
159	The Council of Europe Convention on Cinematographic Co-production (revised) Order 2020
160	The Communications (Television Licensing) (Amendment) (No. 2) Regulations 2020
161 (W. 29)	The A55 Trunk Road (Junction 12 (Talybont) to Junction 13 (Abergwyngregyn), Gwynedd) (Closure of Central Reservation Crossings) Order 2020
162 (W. 30)	The A487 Trunk Road (Gellilydan, Gwynedd) (40 mph Speed Limit) Order 2020
163 (W. 31)	The Adoption Agencies (Wales) (Amendment) Regulations 2020
164	The Air Navigation (Restriction of Flying) (Wimbledon) Regulations 2020
165	The Lancashire County Council (A601(M) Partial Revocation) Scheme 2019
166 (W. 32)	The A40 Trunk Road (Haverfordwest Eastern Bypass, Pembrokeshire) (Temporary Traffic Prohibitions & Restrictions) Order 2020
167	The Air Navigation (Restriction of Flying) (Royal Air Force Syerston) Regulations 2020
168	The Combined Fire and Rescue Authorities (Membership and Allowances) (Amendment) Regulations 2020
169	The Proscribed Organisations (Name Change) Order 2020
170	The Greater Manchester (Light Rapid Transit System) (Exemptions) (Amendment) Order 2020
171 (W. 33)	The A483 Trunk Road (Llandovery to Sugar Loaf, Carmarthenshire) (Temporary Traffic Prohibitions & Restrictions) Order 2020
172 (W. 34)	The A55 Trunk Road (Junction 11 (Llys y Gwynt Interchange), Bangor, Gwynedd to Junction 16 (Puffin Roundabout, Penmaenmawr, Conwy)) (Temporary Traffic Prohibitions and Restrictions) Order 2020
173 (W. 35)	The A483 Trunk Road (Newbridge Bypass, Wrexham County Borough) (Temporary Traffic Prohibitions & Restrictions) Order 2020
174 (W. 36)	The A55 Trunk Road (Westbound Carriageway between Junction 27 (Talardy Interchange), Denbighshire & Junction 24 (Faenol Interchange), Conwy) (Temporary Prohibition of Vehicles, Cyclists & Pedestrians) Order 2020
175 (W. 37) (C. 12)	The Public Health (Minimum Price for Alcohol) (Wales) Act 2018 (Commencement No. 2) Order 2020
176	The Public Bodies (Abolition of Public Works Loan Commissioners) Order 2020
177 (W. 38)	The Trade in Animals and Related Products (Wales) (Amendment) Regulations 2020
179 (W. 39)	The A466 Trunk Road (Newhouse Roundabout to High Beech Roundabout, Chepstow, Monmouthshire) (Red Route Clearway) Order 2020
179	The Local Government Pension Scheme (Amendment) Regulations 2020
180 (W. 40)	The A466 Trunk Road (Newhouse Roundabout to High Beech Roundabout, Chepstow, Monmouthshire) (40 mph & 50 mph Speed Limits) Order 2020
181 (W. 41)	The A5 Trunk Road (Chirk Bypass, Wrexham County Borough) (Temporary Traffic Prohibitions & Restrictions) Order 2020
182 (W. 42)	The A5 Trunk Road (Halton Roundabout to Whitehurst Roundabout, Chirk, Wrexham County Borough) (Temporary Traffic Prohibitions & Restriction) Order 2020
183 (W. 43)	The A487 Trunk Road (Machynlleth to the Powys/Ceredigion County Border, Powys) (Temporary Prohibition of Vehicles, Cyclists & Pedestrians) Order 2020
184 (W. 44)	The A44 Trunk Road (Pont Dolau to Glanyrafon, near Aberystwyth, Ceredigion) (Temporary Prohibition of Vehicles) Order 2020
185	The Value Added Tax (Refund of Tax) Order 2020
186	The Hampshire and Isle of Wight Fire and Rescue Authority (Combination Scheme) Order 2020
187	The Video Recordings (Labelling) (Amendment) Regulations 2020
188	The Police Pensions (Contributions and Additional Voluntary Contributions Provider) (Amendment) (England and Wales) Regulations 2020
189	The Controlled Drugs (Supervision of Management and Use) (Amendment) Regulations 2020
190	The Police and Crime Commissioner Elections (Amendment) Order 2020
191	Not Allocated
192	Not Allocated
193	The Social Security Revaluation of Earnings Factors Order 2020
194	The Taxes (Interest Rate) (Amendment) Regulations 2020
195	The Occupational and Personal Pension Schemes (General Levy) (Amendment) Regulations 2020
196	Not Allocated
197	Not Allocated
198	The Stroud (Electoral Changes) Order 2020
199	The Van Benefit and Car and Van Fuel Benefit Order 2020
200	The Terrorism Act 2000 (Proscribed Organisations) (Amendment) Order 2020

== 201–300 ==
Number	Title
201	The National Health Service (Charges for Drugs and Appliances) (Amendment) Regulations 2020
202 (W. 45)	The Renting Homes (Fees etc.) (Prescribed Limits of Default Payments) (Wales) Regulations 2020
203 (W. 46)	The A494 Trunk Road (Ewloe Green, Flintshire to Dolgellau, Gwynedd) (Temporary Traffic Restrictions & Prohibitions) Order 2020
204 (W. 47)	The A487 Trunk Road (Great Darkgate Street and Owain Glyndwr Square, Aberystwyth, Ceredigion) (Temporary Traffic Prohibitions) Order 2020
205	The Employment Rights (Increase of Limits) Order 2020
206 (W. 48)	The Official Controls (Plant Health and Genetically Modified Organisms) (Wales) Regulations 2020
207	The Financial Assistance for Environmental Purposes (England) Order 2020
208	The Oil and Gas Authority (Levy and Fees) and Pollution Prevention and Control (Fees) (Miscellaneous Amendments) Regulations 2020
209	The Value Added Tax (Finance) Order 2020
210 (L. 8)	The Magistrates’ Courts (Knife Crime Prevention Orders) Rules 2020
211	The Insolvency Act 1986 (Prescribed Part) (Amendment) Order 2020
212	The Personal Injuries (Civilians) Scheme (Amendment) Order 2020
213	The Armed Forces and Reserve Forces (Compensation Scheme) (Amendment) Order 2020
214	The Isles of Scilly (Application of Water Legislation) Order 2020
215	The Pendle (Electoral Changes) Order 2020
216 (C. 13)	The Environment Act 1995 (Commencement No. 26) Order 2020
217	The Isles of Scilly (Amendment) Order 2020
218	The Employment Allowance (Excluded Persons) Regulations 2020
219	The Eritrea (Asset-Freezing) (Revocation) Regulations 2020
220 (W. 49)	The Food Information (Wales) (Amendment) Regulations 2020
221	The Republic of Maldives (Asset-Freezing) (Revocation) Regulations 2020
222 (W. 50)	The A483 Trunk Road (Dolfor Road, Newtown, Powys) (Temporary Prohibition of Vehicles, Cyclists & Pedestrians) Order 2020
223	The Superannuation (Admission to Schedule 1 to the Superannuation Act 1972) Order 2020
224	The Public Service (Civil Servants and Others) Pensions (Amendment) Regulations 2020
225	The Civil Service (Other Crown servants) Pension Scheme (Amendment) Regulations 2020
226	The National Health Service (General Medical Services Contracts and Personal Medical Services Agreements) (Amendment) Regulations 2020
227 (W. 51)	The A55 Trunk Road (Junction 34 (Ewloe Interchange) to Junction 36 (Warren Interchange) Flintshire) (Temporary Prohibition of Vehicles, Cyclists and Pedestrians) Order 2020
228 (W. 52)	The A55 Trunk Road (Junction 11 (Llys y Gwynt) to Junction 12 (Tal-y-bont), Gwynedd) (Temporary Prohibition of Vehicles, Cyclists & Pedestrians) Order 2020
229	The Road Vehicles (Defeat Devices, Fuel Economy and Type-Approval) (Amendment) Regulations 2020
230	The Public Service Pensions Revaluation Order 2020
231 (W. 53)	The A5 Trunk Road (Junction 11, (Llys y Gwynt Interchange), Bangor, Gwynedd to (Gledrid Roundabout), Chirk, Wrexham to the Wales/England Border) (Temporary Traffic Prohibitions and Restrictions) Order 2020
232 (W. 54)	The Health Protection (Notification) (Wales) (Amendment) Regulations 2020
233	The Statutory Parental Bereavement Pay (General) Regulations 2020
234	The Social Security Benefits Up-rating Order 2020
235	The Guaranteed Minimum Pensions Increase Order 2020
236	The Animals (Scientific Procedures) Act 1986 (Fees) Order 2020
237	The Health Protection (Notification) (Amendment) Regulations 2020
238	The Social Security Contributions (Decisions and Appeals) (Amendment) Regulations 2020
239	The Social Security (Contributions) (Amendment) Regulations 2020
240	The Statutory Parental Bereavement Pay (Miscellaneous Amendments) Regulations 2020
241	The Recovery of Costs (Remand to Youth Detention Accommodation) (Amendment) Regulations 2020
242	The Pneumoconiosis etc. (Workers’ Compensation) (Payment of Claims) (Amendment) Regulations 2020
243 (W. 55)	The A458 Trunk Road (Mallwyd to Nant yr Ehedydd, Gwynedd) (Temporary Traffic Prohibitions & Restrictions) Order 2020
244	The Mesothelioma Lump Sum Payments (Conditions and Amounts) (Amendment) Regulations 2020
245	The Wildlife and Countryside Act 1981 (Variation of Schedule 2) (England) Order 2020
246	The Statutory Parental Bereavement Pay (Administration) Regulations 2020
247 (W. 56)	The National Health Service (Dental Charges) (Wales) (Amendment) Regulations 2020
248	The Marketing of Fruit Plant and Propagating Material (England) (Amendment) Regulations 2020
249	The Parental Bereavement Leave Regulations 2020
250	The Value Added Tax (Drugs and Medicines) Order 2020
251	The Government Resources and Accounts Act 2000 (Estimates and Accounts) Order 2020
252	The Statutory Parental Bereavement Pay (Persons Abroad and Mariners) Regulations 2020
253	Her Majesty's Chief Inspector of Education, Children's Services and Skills (Fees and Frequency of Inspections) (Children's Homes etc.) (Amendment) Regulations 2020
254 (W. 57)	The A487 Trunk Road (Dyfi Bridge to Parc Menai, Gwynedd) (Temporary Traffic Prohibitions and Restrictions) Order 2020
255 (W. 58)	The A40 Trunk Road (Eastbound Entry Slip Road, Johnstown, Carmarthenshire) (Temporary Prohibition of Vehicles) Order 2020
256	The Addition of Vitamins, Minerals and Other Substances (England) (Amendment) Regulations 2020
257 (W. 59)	The Addition of Vitamins, Minerals and Other Substances (Wales) (Amendment) Regulations 2020
258	The Branded Health Service Medicines (Costs) (Amendment) Regulations 2020
259 (W. 60)	The A466 Trunk Road (Newhouse Roundabout to High Beech Roundabout, Chepstow, Monmouthshire) (Prohibition of U-Turns) Order 2020
260	The Capital Allowances Act 2001 (Amendment of Section 45K) Order 2020
261	The Individual Savings Account (Amendment No. 2) Regulations 2020
262 (W. 61)	The A470 Trunk Road (Mallwyd Roundabout, Gwynedd to Black Cat Roundabout, Conwy) (Temporary Traffic Prohibitions and Restrictions) Order 2020
263 (W. 62)	The National Health Service (Existing Liabilities Scheme for General Practice) (Wales) Regulations 2020
264	The Coroners and Justice Act 2009 (Alteration of Coroner Areas) Order 2020
265	The Extradition Act 2003 (Amendments to Designations) Order 2020
266	The Social Security Benefits Up-rating Regulations 2020
267	The Healthy Start Scheme and Welfare Food (Miscellaneous Amendments) Regulations 2020
268	The Thames Water Utilities Limited (Thames Tideway Tunnel) (Amendment) Order 2020
269	The Child Trust Funds (Amendment No. 2) Regulations 2020
270	Not Allocated
271	The Legal Services Act 2007 (Approved Regulator) Order 2020
272 (W. 64)	The Wildlife and Countryside Act 1981 (Variation of Schedule 2) (Wales) Order 2020
273	The Employment Allowance (Increase of Maximum Amount) Regulations 2020
274	The Communications (Bailiwick of Guernsey) Order 2020
275	The Double Taxation Relief and International Tax Enforcement (Gibraltar) Order 2020
276	The Scotland Act 1998 (Transfer of Functions to the Scottish Ministers etc.) Order 2020
277	The Child Abduction and Custody (Parties to Conventions) (Amendment) Order 2020
278	The Inspectors of Education, Children's Services and Skills (No. 2) Order 2020
279	The Nicaragua (Sanctions) (Overseas Territories) Order 2020
280	Not Allocated
281	The Cyber (Sanctions) (Overseas Territories) Order 2020 Cyber (Sanctions) (Overseas Territories) Order 2020
282	The Somalia (Sanctions) (Overseas Territories) (Amendment) Order 2020
283	The Turkey (Sanctions) (Unauthorised Drilling Activities in the Eastern Mediterranean) (Overseas Territories) Order 2020
284 (L. 9)	The Magistrates’ Courts (Functions of Authorised Persons – Civil Proceedings) Rules 2020
285 (C. 14)	The National Insurance Contributions (Termination Awards and Sporting Testimonials) Act 2019 (Commencement and Transitional Provisions) Regulations 2020
286 (W. 65)	The Social Care Wales (Specification of Social Care Workers) (Registration) (Amendment) Regulations 2020
287	The Statutory Sick Pay (General) (Coronavirus Amendment) Regulations 2020
288	The Housing Benefit (Transitional Provision) (Amendment) Regulations 2020
289	The Employment and Support Allowance and Universal Credit (Coronavirus Disease) Regulations 2020
290	The Pensions Increase (Review) Order 2020 Pensions Increase (Review) Order 2020
291	The Income Tax (Benefits in Kind) (Exemption for Welfare Counselling) (Amendment) Regulations 2020
292 (W. 66)	The School Teachers’ Pay and Conditions (Wales) (Amendment) Order 2020 School Teachers’ Pay and Conditions (Wales) (Amendment) Order 2020
293	The Legal Services Act 2007 (Designation as a Licensing Authority) Order 2020
294	The Immigration and Nationality (Fees) (Amendment) (No. 2) Regulations 2020
295 (W. 67)	The Food Information (Wales) (Amendment) (No. 2) Regulations 2020
296	The National Health Service (Existing Liabilities Scheme for General Practice) Regulations 2020
297	The Tax Credits, Child Benefit, Guardian's Allowance and Childcare Payments (Miscellaneous Amendments) Regulations 2020
298	The Tax Credits, Child Benefit and Guardian's Allowance Up-rating Regulations 2020
299	The Social Security (Contributions) (Rates, Limits and Thresholds Amendments and National Insurance Funds Payments) Regulations 2020
300	The Social Security (Contributions) (Amendment No. 2) Regulations 2020

== 301–400 ==
Number	Title
301	The Legal Services Act 2007 (Chartered Institute of Legal Executives) (Appeals from Licensing Authority Decisions) Order 2020
302	The Guardian's Allowance Up-rating Regulations 2020 Guardian's Allowance Up-rating Regulations 2020
303	The Social Security (Contributions) (Re-rating) Consequential Amendment Regulations 2020
304	The Statutory Sick Pay (General) (Coronavirus Amendment) (No. 2) Regulations 2020
305	Not Allocated
306	The Wiltshire (Electoral Changes) Order 2020 Wiltshire (Electoral Changes) Order 2020
307	The Gambling Act 2005 (Variation of Monetary Limits) Order 2020
308 (W. 68)	The Health Protection (Coronavirus) (Wales) Regulations 2020
309 (W. 69)	The A487 Trunk Road (Llanrhystud, Ceredigion) (Restricted Road & 40 mph Speed Limit) Order 2020
310	The Criminal Justice Act 2003 (Surcharge) (Amendment) Order 2020
311 (W. 70)	The Marketing of Fruit Plant and Propagating Material (Wales) (Amendment) Regulations 2020
312	The Electrical Safety Standards in the Private Rented Sector (England) Regulations 2020
313 (W. 71)	The A470 & A458 Trunk Roads (Moat Lane Level Crossing, Caersws and Buttington Level Crossing, Buttington, Powys) (Temporary Prohibition of Vehicles) Order 2020
314	The First-tier Tribunal (Immigration and Asylum Chamber) Fees (Amendment) Order 2020
315	The UK Property Rich Collective Investment Vehicles (Amendment of the Taxation of Chargeable Gains Act 1992) Regulations 2020
316	The Damages for Bereavement (Variation of Sum) (England and Wales) Order 2020
317 (C. 15)	The European Union (Withdrawal Agreement) Act 2020 (Commencement No. 2) Regulations 2020
318	The Railways (Interoperability) (Miscellaneous Amendments and Revocations) (EU Exit) Regulations 2020
319 (W. 72)	The Adoption Agencies (Wales) (Amendment) (No. 2) Regulations 2020
320	The Social Security (Contributions) (Amendment No. 3) Regulations 2020
321 (C. 16)	The Higher Education and Research Act 2017 (Commencement Order No. 6) Regulations 2020
322	The Financial Services and Markets Act 2000 (Exemption) (Amendment) Order 2020
323 (W. 73)	The M4 Motorway (Junction 34 (Miskin), Rhondda Cynon Taf to Junction 49 (Pont Abraham), Carmarthenshire) (Temporary Prohibition of Vehicles) Order 2020
324	The Single Use Carrier Bags Charges (England) (Amendment) Order 2020
325	The Reinforcement to the North Shropshire Electricity Distribution Network Order 2020
326 (W. 74)	The Health Protection (Coronavirus, Business Closure) (Wales) Regulations 2020
327	Health Protection (Coronavirus, Business Closure) (England) Regulations 2020
328 (W. 75)	The Code of Practice in relation to the performance and improvement of social services in Wales (Appointed Day) (Wales) Order 2020
329	The Dogger Bank Creyke Beck Offshore Wind Farm (Amendment) Order 2020
330	The Town and Country Planning (General Permitted Development) (England) (Amendment) Order 2020
331	The Client Money Protection Schemes for Property Agents (Approval and Designation of Schemes) (Amendment) Regulations 2020
332	The Taxes (Amendments) (EU Exit) Regulations 2020 Taxes (Amendments) (EU Exit) Regulations 2020
333	The Capital Gains Tax (Annual Exempt Amount) Order 2020
334 (W. 76)	The Health Protection (Coronavirus: Closure of Leisure Businesses, Footpaths and Access Land) (Wales) Regulations 2020
335	The International Accounting Standards, Statutory Auditors and Third Country Auditors (Amendment) (EU Exit) Regulations 2020
336	Not Allocated
337	Not Allocated
338	The National Minimum Wage (Amendment) Regulations 2020
339	The National Minimum Wage (Amendment) (No. 2) Regulations 2020
340 (W. 77)	The Home Loss Payments (Prescribed Amounts) (Wales) Regulations 2020
341	The Annual Tax on Enveloped Dwellings (Indexation of Annual Chargeable Amounts) Order 2020
342	The Finance Act 2004 (Standard Lifetime Allowance) Regulations 2020
343	The Income Tax (Indexation) Order 2020 Income Tax (Indexation) Order 2020
344	The Civil Liability (Information Requirements) and Risk Transformation (Amendment) Regulations 2020
345	The Abortion (Northern Ireland) Regulations 2020
346	The Street and Road Works (Amendments Relating to Electronic Communications) (England) (Amendment) Regulations 2020
347 (W. 78)	The Agricultural Wages (Wales) Order 2020
348	The Buckinghamshire (Structural Changes) (Supplementary Provision and Amendment) Order 2020
349 (W. 79)	The A483 Trunk Road (Junction 1 (Ruabon Interchange) to the Wales/England Border, Wrexham County Borough) (Temporary Traffic Prohibitions and Restrictions) Order 2020
350	Health Protection (Coronavirus, Restrictions) (England) Regulations 2020
351	The National Health Service (Amendments Relating to the Provision of Primary Care Services During a Pandemic etc.) Regulations 2020
352	Not Allocated
353 (W. 80)	The Health Protection (Coronavirus Restrictions) (Wales) Regulations 2020
354	The Parental Bereavement Leave and Pay (Consequential Amendments to Subordinate Legislation) Regulations 2020
355	The Occupational and Personal Pension Schemes (General Levy) (Revocation) Regulations 2020
356	Not Allocated
357 (C. 17)	The Serious Organised Crime and Police Act 2005 (Commencement No. 16) Order 2020
358	The Protection of Freedoms Act 2012 (Transitory Provision) Order 2020
359	The Police Act 1997 (Criminal Records) (Amendment) Regulations 2020
360	The Investigatory Powers (Temporary Judicial Commissioners and Modification of Time Limits) Regulations 2020
361 (C. 18)	The Coronavirus Act 2020 (Commencement No. 1) Regulations 2020
362	The Merchant Shipping (Tonnage) (Amendment) Regulations 2020
363	Not Allocated
364	The Nursing and Midwifery Council (Emergency Procedures) (Amendment) Rules 2020 Order of Council 2020
365	The Working Time (Coronavirus) (Amendment) Regulations 2020
366 (W. 81) (C. 19)	The Coronavirus Act 2020 (Commencement No. 1) (Wales) Regulations 2020
367 (W. 82)	The Town and Country Planning (General Permitted Development) (Amendment) (Wales) Order 2020
368	The Competition Act 1998 (Health Services for Patients in England) (Coronavirus) (Public Policy Exclusion) Order 2020
369	The Competition Act 1998 (Groceries) (Coronavirus) (Public Policy Exclusion) Order 2020
370	The Competition Act 1998 (Solent Maritime Crossings) (Coronavirus) (Public Policy Exclusion) Order 2020
371	The Social Security (Coronavirus) (Further Measures) Regulations 2020
372	The Automatic Enrolment (Earnings Trigger and Qualifying Earnings Band) Order 2020
373	The Income Tax (Pay As You Earn) (Amendment No. 2) Regulations 2020
374	The Statutory Sick Pay (Coronavirus) (Suspension of Waiting Days and General Amendment) Regulations 2020
375	The Feed-in Tariffs (Amendment) (Coronavirus) Order 2020
376 (W. 83)	The A48 and A466 Trunk Roads (Highbeech Roundabout, Chepstow, Monmouthshire) (Temporary Prohibition of Vehicles) Order 2020
377 (W. 84)	The A483 Trunk Road (Garth, Powys) (Temporary Prohibition of Vehicles) Order 2020
378 (W. 85)	The A48 Trunk Road (Cross Hands Roundabout to South-East of Pensarn Roundabout) and the A40 Trunk Road (Pensarn Roundabout to St Clears Roundabout, Carmarthenshire) (Temporary Traffic Restrictions and Prohibition) Order 2020
379	Not Allocated
380 (L. 10)	The District Probate Registries (Amendment) Order 2020
381	The Official Controls (Plant Health and Genetically Modified Organisms) (England) (Amendment) Regulations 2020
382	The Motor Vehicles (Tests) (Amendment) (Coronavirus) Regulations 2020
383 (W. 86)	The Revised Code of Practice on the exercise of social services functions in relation to Part 4 (direct payments and choice of accommodation) and Part 5 (charging and financial assessment) of the Social Services and Well-being (Wales) Act 2014 (Appointed Day) Order 2020
384	The Posted Workers (Agency Workers) Regulations 2020
385	The Elections (Policy Development Grants Scheme) (Amendment) (No. 2) Order 2020
386	The Judicial Pensions and Fee-Paid Judges’ Pension Schemes (Contributions) (Amendment) Regulations 2020
387	The Private Security Industry (Licence Fees) Order 2020
388 (C. 20)	The Coronavirus Act 2020 (Commencement No. 2) Regulations 2020
389 (W. 87)	The Regulation and Inspection of Social Care (Wales) Act 2016 and Regulated Services (Miscellaneous Amendments) Regulations 2020
390	The Offshore Installations (Safety Zones) Order 2020
391	The Coronavirus (Retention of Fingerprints and DNA Profiles in the Interests of National Security) Regulations 2020
392	The Local Authorities and Police and Crime Panels (Coronavirus) (Flexibility of Local Authority and Police and Crime Panel Meetings) (England and Wales) Regulations 2020
393	The Air Navigation (Restriction of Flying) (VE Day 75 Rehearsal) Regulations 2020
394	The Air Navigation (Restriction of Flying) (Wimbledon) (Revocation) Regulations 2020
395	Local Government and Police and Crime Commissioner (Coronavirus) (Postponement of Elections and Referendums) (England and Wales) Regulations 2020
396	Armed Forces Act (Continuation) Order 2020
397	The Social Security (Coronavirus) (Further Measures) Amendment Regulations 2020
398	The Justices of the Peace and Authorised Court and Tribunal Staff (Costs) Regulations 2020
399 (W. 88)	The Health Protection (Coronavirus Restrictions) (Wales) (Amendment) Regulations 2020
400	The Prison and Young Offender Institution (Coronavirus) (Amendment) Rules 2020

== 401–500 ==
Number	Title
401	The Offender Management Act 2007 (Coronavirus) (Approved Premises) (Amendment) Regulations 2020
402	The A585 Windy Harbour to Skippool Highway Development Consent Order 2020
403	The Grants to the Churches Conservation Trust Order 2020
404	The Accounts and Audit (Coronavirus) (Amendment) Regulations 2020
405	The Social Fund Funeral Expenses Payment (Coronavirus) (Amendment) Regulations 2020
406	The Church Representation Rules (Amendment) Resolution 2020
407	The Anguilla (Coronavirus) (General Election Postponement) Order 2020
408	The Care of Cathedrals (Amendment) Rules 2020
409	The Social Security (Coronavirus) (Prisoners) Regulations 2020
410	The M42 Motorway (Junction 8 to Junction 7) and M6 Toll Motorway (M6 Toll Junction T2 to M42 Junction 8) (Warwickshire) (Temporary Prohibition of Traffic) Order 2020
411	The National Health Service (Performers Lists) (England) (Coronavirus) (Amendment) Regulations 2020
412	The Town and Country Planning (General Permitted Development) (Coronavirus) (England) (Amendment) Order 2020
413	The Millbrook Gas Fired Generating Station (Amendment) Order 2020
414 (W. 89)	The Single Use Carrier Bags Charge (Wales) (Amendment) Regulations 2020
415	The Employment Appeal Tribunal (Coronavirus) (Amendment) Rules 2020
416 (L. 11)	The Tribunal Procedure (Coronavirus) (Amendment) Rules 2020
417 (L. 12)	The Criminal Procedure (Amendment No. 2) (Coronavirus) Rules 2020
418	The Electronic Monitoring (Responsible Persons) (Coronavirus) (Amendment) Order 2020
419	The Riverside Energy Park Order 2020
420 (W. 90)	The Town and Country Planning (General Permitted Development) (Amendment) (No. 2) (Wales) Order 2020
421 (W. 91)	The A483 Trunk Road (Pont Abraham to Llandeilo, Carmarthenshire) (Temporary Speed Restrictions & No Overtaking) Order 2020
422 (W. 92)	The A48 Trunk Road (Pensarn Roundabout, Carmarthen to Nantycaws, Carmarthenshire) (Temporary Prohibition of Vehicles) Order 2020
423 (W. 93)	The A4076 & A40 Trunk Roads (Haverfordwest to Milford Haven, Pembrokeshire) (Temporary Speed Restrictions & No Overtaking) Order 2020
424 (W. 94)	The A477 Trunk Road (East Williamston to Pembroke Dock, Pembrokeshire) (Temporary Speed Restrictions & No Overtaking) Order 2020
425	The Land Registration (Amendment) Rules 2020
426	The Local Government (Coronavirus) (Structural Changes) (Consequential Amendments) (England) Regulations 2020
427	The Statutory Sick Pay (General) (Coronavirus Amendment) (No. 3) Regulations 2020
428 (W. 95)	The A465 Trunk Road (Rhymney Interchange, Caerphilly County Borough & Tredegar Interchange, Blaenau Gwent) (Temporary Prohibition of Vehicles & Cyclists) Order 2020
429 (W. 96)	The A465 Trunk Road (Llanfoist Interchange to Hardwick Roundabout, Abergavenny, Monmouthshire) (Temporary Prohibition of Vehicles & Cyclists) Order 2020
430	The Civil Aviation (Aerial Advertising) (Amendment) Regulations 2020
431 (W. 97)	The A470 Trunk Road (Llanrwst, Conwy) (Temporary Prohibition of Vehicles, Cyclists and Pedestrians) Order 2020
432	The Football Spectators (2020 UEFA European Championship Control Period) (Coronavirus) (Revocation) Order 2020
433	The Safeguarding Vulnerable Groups Act 2006 (Regulated Activities) (Coronavirus) Order 2020
434	The Safety of Sports Grounds (Designation) (Amendment) (No. 2) Order 2020
435	The Competition Act 1998 (Health Services for Patients in Wales) (Coronavirus) (Public Policy Exclusion) Order 2020
436	The Education (National Curriculum) (Key Stages 1 and 2 Assessment Arrangements) (England) (Coronavirus) (Amendment) Order 2020
437 (W. 98)	The A40 Trunk Road (St Clears, Carmarthenshire to Haverfordwest, Pembrokeshire) (Temporary Speed Restrictions & No Overtaking) Order 2020
438	The International Tax Compliance (Amendment) Regulations 2020
439	The Civil Legal Aid (Procedure) (Amendment) Regulations 2020
440	The Air Navigation (Restriction of Flying) (Louisa Jordan Hospital, Glasgow) Regulations 2020
441 (W. 99)	The A40 Trunk Road (St Clears Roundabout, Carmarthenshire) (Temporary Prohibition of Vehicles) Order 2020
442 (W. 100)	The Local Authorities (Coronavirus) (Meetings) (Wales) Regulations 2020
443 (W. 101)	The M4 Motorway (Junction 23, Rogiet to the Wales/England Border, Monmouthshire) (Temporary Prohibition of Vehicles) (No.2) Order 2020
444	The Early Years Foundation Stage (Learning and Development and Welfare Requirements) (Coronavirus) (Amendment) Regulations 2020
445	The Adoption and Children (Coronavirus) (Amendment) Regulations 2020
446	The School Admissions (England) (Coronavirus) (Appeals Arrangements) (Amendment) Regulations 2020
447	Health Protection (Coronavirus, Restrictions) (England) (Amendment) Regulations 2020
448	The Offshore Petroleum Production and Pipe-lines (Assessment of Environmental Effects) (Coronavirus) (Amendment) Regulations 2020
449	The Non-Domestic Rating (Transitional Protection Payments and Rates Retention) (Coronavirus) (Amendment) Regulations 2020
450	The Maternity Allowance, Statutory Maternity Pay, Statutory Paternity Pay, Statutory Adoption Pay, Statutory Shared Parental Pay and Statutory Parental Bereavement Pay (Normal Weekly Earnings etc.) (Coronavirus) (Amendment) Regulations 2020
451	The Taking Control of Goods and Certification of Enforcement Agents (Amendment) (Coronavirus) Regulations 2020
452 (W. 102)	The Health Protection (Coronavirus Restrictions) (Wales) (Amendment) (No. 2) Regulations 2020
453 (W. 103)	The M48 Motorway (Westbound Carriageway between Junction 2 (Newhouse Interchange) and the M4 Motorway, (Junction 23 (Rogiet), Chepstow, Monmouthshire) (Temporary Prohibition of Vehicles) Order 2020
454	Not Allocated
455	The Flags (Northern Ireland) (Amendment) (EU Exit) Regulations 2020
456	The State Pension Credit (Coronavirus) (Electronic Claims) (Amendment) Regulations 2020
457 (W. 104)	The A40 Trunk Road (Fishguard to Haverfordwest, Pembrokeshire) (Temporary Speed Restrictions & No Overtaking) Order 2020
458	The Value Added Tax (Zero Rate for Personal Protective Equipment) (Coronavirus) Order 2020
459	The Value Added Tax (Extension of Zero-Rating to Electronically Supplied Books etc.) (Coronavirus) Order 2020
460	The Harbours and Highways (Environmental Impact Assessment) (Amendment) (EU Exit) Regulations 2020
461 (W. 105)	The Local Government (Coronavirus) (Postponement of Elections) (Wales) Regulations 2020
462	The Solicitors (Disciplinary Proceedings) (Amendment) Rules 2020
463	The Direct Payments to Farmers (Legislative Continuity) Act 2020 (Consequential Amendments) Regulations 2020
464	The Education (School Teachers’ Qualifications and Induction Arrangements) (England) (Coronavirus) (Amendment) Regulations 2020
465 (W. 106)	The A40 Trunk Road (Abergavenny, Monmouthshire) (Temporary Prohibition of Vehicles & Cyclists) Order 2020
466	The National Health Service (Quality Accounts) (Amendment) (Coronavirus) Regulations 2020
467 (W. 107)	The A40/A449 Trunk Roads (West of Glangrwyney, Powys to Raglan, Monmouthshire & Raglan to the Wales/England Border, Monmouthshire) (Temporary Traffic Prohibitions & Restrictions) Order 2020
468	The Misuse of Drugs (Coronavirus) (Amendments Relating to the Supply of Controlled Drugs During a Pandemic etc.) Regulations 2020
469	The National Health Service Commissioning Board and Clinical Commissioning Groups (Responsibilities and Standing Rules) (Amendment) Regulations 2020
470 (W. 108)	The Direct Payments to Farmers (Crop Diversification Derogation) (Wales) Regulations 2020
471	The Special Educational Needs and Disability (Coronavirus) (Amendment) Regulations 2020
472	The Criminal Legal Aid (Coronavirus, Remuneration) (Amendment) Regulations 2020
473 (W. 109)	The Common Agricultural Policy (Payments to Farmers) (Coronavirus) (Wales) Regulations 2020
474	The Lake Lothing (Lowestoft) Third Crossing Order 2020
475	The Direct Payments to Farmers (Crop Diversification Derogation) (England) Regulations 2020
476	The Teachers’ Skills Test (England) (Miscellaneous Amendments) Regulations 2020
477	The Common Agricultural Policy (Control and Enforcement, Cross-Compliance, Scrutiny of Transactions and Appeals) (Coronavirus) (Amendment) (England) Regulations 2020
478 (C. 21)	The Legal Aid, Sentencing and Punishment of Offenders Act 2012 (Commencement No. 14) Order 2020
479 (W. 110)	The Education (Admission Appeals Arrangements) (Wales) (Coronavirus) (Amendment) Regulations 2020
480	The Financial Services and Markets Act 2000 (Regulated Activities) (Coronavirus) (Amendment) Order 2020
481	The Competition Act 1998 (Dairy Produce) (Coronavirus) (Public Policy Exclusion) Order 2020 (revoked)
482	The Social Security (Scotland) Act 2018 (Information-Sharing and Scottish Child Payment) (Consequential Provision and Modifications) Order 2020
483	The Scottish National Investment Bank Act 2020 (Consequential Provision) Order 2020
484	The Consumer Protection (Enforcement) (Amendment etc.) Regulations 2020
485	The Ecodesign for Energy-Related Products (Amendment) Regulations 2020
486 (W. 111)	The Regulated Services (Annual Returns) (Wales) (Amendment) (Coronavirus) Regulations 2020
487 (W. 112)	The M4 Motorway (Slip Roads at Junction 48 (Hendy), Carmarthenshire) (Temporary 30 mph & 50 mph Speed Limits) Order 2020
488 (W. 113)	The A470 Trunk Road (Llanrwst, Conwy County Borough) (Temporary Prohibition of Vehicles & Cyclists) Order 2020
489	The Environmental Protection (Disposal of Polychlorinated Biphenyls and other Dangerous Substances) (England and Wales) (Amendment) Regulations 2020
490	The Victims’ Payments (Amendment) Regulations 2020
491 (W. 114)	The M48 Motorway (Junction 2 (Newhouse Interchange), Chepstow, Monmouthshire) (Temporary Prohibition of Vehicles) Order 2020
492 (W. 115)	The A470 Trunk Road (Junction 19 (Glan Conwy Interchange), Conwy County Borough) (Temporary Prohibition of Vehicles) Order 2020
493 (W. 116)	The Community Health Councils (Constitution, Membership and Procedures) (Wales) (Amendment) Regulations 2020
494	The A6055 (A1(M) Junction 56, Barton Interchange) (Trunking) Order 2020
495 (W. 117)	The A48 Trunk Road (Between Highbeech Roundabout and Wye Bridge, Chepstow, Monmouthshire) (Temporary Traffic Prohibitions and 10 mph Speed Limit) Order 2020
496	The Merchant Shipping (Port State Control and Prevention of Pollution from Noxious Liquid Substances in Bulk) (Amendment) Regulations 2020
497 (W. 118)	The Health Protection (Coronavirus Restrictions) (Wales) (Amendment) (No. 3) Regulations 2020
498	Not Allocated
499 (W. 119)	The A40 Trunk Road (Llandeilo to Llandovery, Carmarthenshire) (Temporary Speed Restrictions & No Overtaking) Order 2020
500	Health Protection (Coronavirus, Restrictions) (England) (Amendment) (No. 2) Regulations 2020

== 501–600 ==
Number	Title
501	The Merchant Shipping (Life-Saving Appliances and Arrangements) Regulations 2020
502	The Local Government Pension Scheme (Northumberland and Tyne and Wear Pension Fund Merger) Regulations 2020
503	The Abortion (Northern Ireland) (No. 2) Regulations 2020
504	The Regulation (EC) No 1370/2007 (Public Service Obligations in Transport) (Amendment) (EU Exit) Regulations 2020
505	The Town and Country Planning (Development Management Procedure, Listed Buildings and Environmental Impact Assessment) (England) (Coronavirus) (Amendment) Regulations 2020
506	The Individual Savings Account (Amendment No. 3) (Coronavirus) Regulations 2020
507 (W. 120)	The Bathing Water (Amendment) (Wales) (Coronavirus) Regulations 2020
508	The Prison and Young Offender Institution (Coronavirus) (Amendment) (No. 2) Rules 2020
509	The Electricity (Individual Exemptions from the Requirement for a Generation Licence) (England) Order 2020
510	The Direct Payments to Farmers (Application Deadlines) (Coronavirus) (Amendment) (England) Regulations 2020
511	The West Midlands Rail Freight Interchange Order 2020
512	The Statutory sick pay (Coronavirus) (Funding of Employers’ Liabilities) Regulations 2020
513	The Statutory Sick Pay (Coronavirus) (Funding of Employers' Liabilities) (Northern Ireland) Regulations 2020
514 (W. 121)	The Planning Applications (Temporary Modifications and Disapplication) (Wales) (Coronavirus) Order 2020
515	The Civil Legal Aid (Remuneration) (Amendment) (Coronavirus) Regulations 2020 (revoked)
516	The Sea Fishing (Enforcement) (Amendment) Regulations 2020
517 (W. 122)	The Sustainable Drainage (Approval and Adoption) (Wales) (Amendment) Order 2020
518 (C. 22)	The European Union (Withdrawal Agreement) Act 2020 (Commencement No. 3) Regulations 2020
519 (W. 123)	The A4042 Trunk Road (Court Farm Roundabout, Torfaen to Hardwick Roundabout, Monmouthshire) (Temporary Speed Restrictions and No Overtaking) Order 2020
520 (C. 23)	The Organ Donation (Deemed Consent) Act 2019 (Commencement No. 3) Regulations 2020
521	The Human Tissue (Permitted Material: Exceptions) (England) Regulations 2020
522	The Universal Credit (Coronavirus) (Self-employed Claimants and Reclaims) (Amendment) Regulations 2020
523	The Companies and Statutory Auditors etc. (Consequential Amendments) (EU Exit) Regulations 2020
524	The Income Tax (Exemption for Coronavirus Related Home Office Expenses) Regulations 2020
525	The Social Security Contributions (Disregarded Payments) (Coronavirus) Regulations 2020
526	The General Synod of the Church of England (Postponement of Elections) Order 2020
527	The Inspectors of Education, Children's Services and Skills (No. 3) Order 2020
528	The M42 Junction 6 Development Consent Order 2020
529 (W. 124)	The Health Protection (Coronavirus Restrictions) (Wales) (Amendment) (No. 4) Regulations 2020
530	The Communications (Jersey) Order 2020
531 (W. 125)	The Payments to Farmers (Controls and Checks) (Wales) (Coronavirus) Regulations 2020
532	The Census (England and Wales) Order 2020
533	The European Communities (Designation) Order 2020
534	The Tax Credits (Coronavirus, Miscellaneous Amendments) Regulations 2020
535	Not Allocated
536	The Traffic Orders Procedure (Coronavirus) (Amendment) (England) Regulations 2020
537	The A46 Trunk Road (Coventry Junctions Upgrade (Binley)) (Detrunking) Order 2020
538	The A46 Trunk Road (Coventry Junctions Upgrade (Binley)) (Trunking) Order 2020
539	The Statutory Sick Pay (General) (Coronavirus Amendment) (No. 4) Regulations 2020
540	The Schools Forums (England) (Coronavirus) (Amendment) Regulations 2020
541	The Food Information (Amendment) (England) Regulations 2020
542	The Education (Independent School Standards) (Coronavirus) (Amendment) Regulations 2020
543	The School Discipline (England) (Coronavirus) (Pupil Exclusions and Reviews) (Amendment) Regulations 2020
544	The Education (Pupil Registration) (England) (Coronavirus) (Amendment) Regulations 2020
545	The Electronic Communications (Universal Service) (Costs) Regulations 2020
546	The Police (Amendment) Regulations 2020
547	The Cleve Hill Solar Park Order 2020
548	The Civil Enforcement of Parking Contraventions (England) General (Amendment) Regulations 2020
549	The Wireless telegraphy (Exemption and Amendment) (Amendment) Regulations 2020
550	The Air Navigation (Restriction of Flying) (Royal Air Force Syerston) (No. 2) Regulations 2020
551	The Direct Payments Penalty Simplification (England) Regulations 2020
552	The Official Controls (Plant Protection Products) Regulations 2020
553 (W. 126)	The A5 Trunk Road (Laybys between Menai Bridge and Junction 8A of the A55 at Carreg Bran, Anglesey) (Temporary Prohibition of Vehicles) Order 2020
554 (W. 127)	The A48 Trunk Road (Cross Hands Roundabout to Pont Abraham Roundabout, Carmarthenshire) (Temporary Traffic Prohibitions and Restrictions) Order 2020
555 (W. 128)	The Census (Wales) Regulations 2020
556	The A63 (Castle Street Improvement, Hull) Development Consent Order 2020
557 (W. 129)	The Health Protection (Coronavirus Restrictions) (Wales) (Amendment) (No. 5) Regulations 2020
558	Health Protection (Coronavirus, Restrictions) (England) (Amendment) (No. 3) Regulations 2020
559	The Misuse of Drugs (Amendment) (England, Wales and Scotland) Regulations 2020
560	The Census (England) Regulations 2020
561 (W. 130)	The A487 Trunk Road (Fishguard to Cardigan, Pembrokeshire) (Temporary Traffic Restrictions & Prohibitions) Order 2020
562	The Prosecution of Offences Act 1985 (Specified Proceedings) (Amendment) Order 2020
563	The Energy Efficiency (Building Renovation and Reporting) (Amendment) Regulations 2020
564	The A2 Trunk Road (Bean and Ebbsfleet Junction Improvements) (Slip Roads and Roundabouts) Order 2020
565 (C. 24)	The Mobile Homes Act 2013 (Commencement No. 2) (England) Order 2020
566	The Human Fertilisation and Embryology (Statutory Storage Period for Embryos and Gametes) (Coronavirus) Regulations 2020
567	The Health Protection (Coronavirus, Public Health Information for Passengers Travelling to England) Regulations 2020
568	Health Protection (Coronavirus, International Travel) (England) Regulations 2020
569	The Electricity (Individual Exemption from the Requirement for a Supply Licence) (E.ON UK CHP Limited) (England) Order 2020
570 (W. 131	The Regulated Services (Service Providers and Responsible Individuals) (Wales) (Amendment) (Coronavirus) Regulations 2020
571	The Air Navigation (Restriction of Flying) (Royal Air Force Syerston) (No. 3) Regulations 2020
572	The Export Control (Somalia) (Amendment) Order 2020
573	The Education (Recognised Bodies) (England) Order 2020
574 (W. 132)	The Health Protection (Coronavirus, International Travel) (Wales) Regulations 2020
575	The Direct Payments to Farmers (Inspections) (Coronavirus) (England) Regulations 2020
576	The Direct Payments to Farmers (Amendment) Regulations 2020
577	The Registration of Births and Deaths (Coronavirus) (Amendment) Regulations 2020
578	The Value Added Tax (Section 55A) (Specified Services and Excepted Supplies) (Change of Commencement Day and Amendment) (Coronavirus) Order 2020
579	The Vegetable Plant Material and Seed (Miscellaneous Amendments) Regulations 2020
580	The Representation of the People (Form of Canvass) (Northern Ireland) Regulations 2020
581	The Representation of the People (Electronic Communications and Amendment) (Northern Ireland) Regulations 2020
582 (L. 13)	The Civil Procedure (Amendment No. 2) (Coronavirus) Rules 2020
583	The Cross-border Parcel Delivery Services (Amendment) (EU Exit) Regulations 2020
584	The Victims and Witnesses (Scotland) Act 2014 (Consequential Modification) Order 2020
585 (W. 133)	The National Health Service (Temporary Disapplication of Tenure of Office) (Wales) (Coronavirus) Regulations 2020
586	The Weights and Measures Act 1985 (Definitions of "Metre" and "Kilogram") (Amendment) Order 2020
587	The Air Navigation (Restriction of Flying) (Silverstone and Turweston) Regulations 2020
588	Health Protection (Coronavirus, Restrictions) (England) (Amendment) (No. 4) Regulations 2020 (revoked)
589	The Water Industry (Specified Infrastructure Projects) (English Undertakers) (Amendment) Regulations 2020
590	The Sanctions (EU Exit) (Miscellaneous Amendments) (No. 2) Regulations 2020
591	The Sanctions (EU Exit) (Miscellaneous Amendments) Regulations 2020
592	Health Protection (Coronavirus, Wearing of Face Coverings on Public Transport) (England) Regulations 2020
593 (W. 134)	The Single Use Carrier Bags Charge (Wales) (Amendment) (No. 2) Regulations 2020
594 (W. 135)	The Waste (Prescribed Enactments) (Wales) Regulations 2020
595 (W. 136)	The Health Protection (Coronavirus, Public Health Information for Persons Travelling to Wales etc.) Regulations 2020
596	The General Osteopathic Council (Coronavirus) (Amendment) Rules Order of Council 2020
597	The Cyber (Sanctions) (EU Exit) Regulations 2020
598 (W. 137)	The A55 Trunk Road (Junction 7 (Cefn Du Interchange) to Junction 8A (Carreg Bran), Anglesey) (Temporary Prohibition of Vehicles, Cyclists & Pedestrians) Order 2020
599	The Education (Pupil Information) (England) (Coronavirus) (Amendment) Regulations 2020
600	The Social Fund and Social Security (Claims and Payments) (Amendment) Regulations 2020

== 601–700 ==
Number	Title
601 (W. 138)	The Vegetable Plant Material and Seed (Miscellaneous Amendments) (Wales) Regulations 2020
602	The Business Tenancies (Protection from Forfeiture: Relevant Period) (Coronavirus) (England) Regulations 2020 (revoked)
603	The Environment (Amendment etc.) (EU Exit) (Amendment) (England and Wales) Regulations 2020
604	The M6 Toll Motorway (M6 Toll Junction T8 to M6 Junction 11a) (Temporary Restriction and Prohibition of Traffic) Order 2020
605 (W. 139)	The A470 Trunk Road (Northbound Entry Slip Road at Taffs Well, Rhondda Cynon Taf) (Temporary Traffic Restriction & Prohibition) Order 2020
606 (W. 140)	The Business Tenancies (Extension of Protection from Forfeiture etc.) (Wales) (Coronavirus) Regulations 2020
607	The General Chiropractic Council (Coronavirus) (Amendment) Rules Order of Council 2020
608	The Bosnia and Herzegovina (Sanctions) (EU Exit) Regulations 2020
609	The Online Intermediation Services for Business Users (Enforcement) Regulations 2020
610	The Nicaragua (Sanctions) (EU Exit) Regulations 2020
611	The Universal Credit (Miscellaneous Amendments) Regulations 2020
612	The Lebanon (Sanctions) (EU Exit) Regulations 2020
613	The Air Navigation (Restriction of Flying) (Hyde Park, London) Regulations 2020
614	The Taking Control of Goods and Certification of Enforcement Agents (Amendment) (No. 2) (Coronavirus) Regulations 2020
615	The Coronavirus Life Assurance Scheme (English and Welsh Schemes) (Excluded Benefits for Tax Purposes) Regulations 2020
616	The Central African Republic (Sanctions) (EU Exit) Regulations 2020
617	The Lebanon (Sanctions) (Assassination of Rafiq Hariri and others) (EU Exit) Regulations 2020
618	The Social Security (Income and Capital) (Miscellaneous Amendments) Regulations 2020
619 (W. 141)	The Health Protection (Coronavirus Restrictions) (Wales) (Amendment) (No. 6) Regulations 2020
620	The Merchant Shipping (Prevention of Pollution by Sewage from Ships) Regulations 2020
621	The Merchant Shipping (Prevention of Pollution by Garbage from Ships) Regulations 2020
622 (W. 142)	The Education (Notification of School Term dates) (Wales) (Amendment) (Coronavirus) Regulations 2020
623 (W. 143)	The Education (Induction Arrangements for School Teachers) (Wales) (Amendment) (Coronavirus) Regulations 2020
624 (W. 144)	The Curriculum Requirements (Amendment of paragraph 7(5) of Schedule 17 to the Coronavirus Act 2020) (Wales) Regulations 2020
625	The Gas (Internal Markets) Regulations 2020
626	Not Allocated
627	The Enterprise Act 2002 (Specification of Additional Section 58 Consideration) Order 2020
628	The Financial Services (Miscellaneous Amendments) (EU Exit) Regulations 2020
629	The Smart meter Communication Licensee Administration (England and Wales) Rules 2020
630	The Occupational and Personal Pension Schemes (Automatic Enrolment) (Amendment) Regulations 2020
631	The Court of Appeal (Recording and Broadcasting) (Amendment) Order 2020
632	The Town and Country Planning (Permitted Development and Miscellaneous Amendments) (England) (Coronavirus) Regulations 2020
633	The Inspectors of Education, Children's Services and Skills (No. 4) Order 2020
634	The Automatic Enrolment (Offshore Employment) (Amendment) Order 2020
635	The Local Elections (Northern Ireland) (Amendment) Order 2020
636 (W. 145)	The A55 Trunk Road (Junction 1 (Kingsland Roundabout), Holyhead, Isle of Anglesey to east of Junction 11 (Llys y Gwynt Interchange), Bangor, Gwynedd) (Temporary Traffic Restrictions & Prohibition) Order 2020
637	Crown Court (Recording and Broadcasting) Order 2020
638 (W. 146)	The Cancellation of Student Loans for Living Costs Liability (Wales) Regulations 2020
639	The Wine (Amendment) Regulations 2020
640 (W. 147)	The Maintained Schools (Amendment of paragraph 7 of Schedule 17 to the Coronavirus Act 2020) (Wales) Regulations 2020
641	The Greater Manchester Combined Authority (Fire and Rescue Functions) (Amendment) Order 2020
642	The Somalia (Sanctions) (EU Exit) Regulations 2020
643	The Limited Liability Partnerships (Amendment etc.) Regulations 2020
644	The Patents, Trade Marks and Registered Designs (Fees) (Coronavirus) (Amendment) Rules 2020
645	The Companies etc. (Filing Requirements) (Temporary Modifications) Regulations 2020
646	The Over the Counter Derivatives, Central Counterparties and Trade Repositories (Amendment, etc., and Transitional Provision) (EU Exit) Regulations 2020
647	The Insolvency (Amendment) (EU Exit) Regulations 2020
648 (W. 148)	The A5 Trunk Road (Antelope Roundabout, Bangor, Gwynedd to the Junction of Lon Refail, Llanfairpwll, Anglesey) (Temporary Traffic Prohibitions and Restrictions) Order 2020
649 (W. 149)	The A487 Trunk Road (Parc Menai Roundabout to Antelope Roundabout, Bangor, Gwynedd) (Temporary Traffic Prohibitions and Restrictions) Order 2020
650	The Domestic Renewable Heat Incentive Scheme and Renewable Heat Incentive Scheme (Amendment) Regulations 2020
651 (L. 14)	The Tribunal Procedure (Amendment) Rules 2020
652	The Insolvency Act 1986 Part A1 Moratorium (Eligibility of Private Registered Providers) Regulations 2020
653 (W. 150)	The Local Authorities (Coronavirus) (Meetings) (Wales) (Amendment) Regulations 2020
654	The National Health Service (Charges to Overseas Visitors) (Amendment) (No. 2) Regulations 2020
655	The Universal Credit (Persons who have attained state pension credit qualifying age) (Amendment) Regulations 2020
656	The Childcare Payments (Coronavirus and Miscellaneous Amendments) Regulations 2020
657	The Fees for Payment of Taxes, etc. by Card Regulations 2020
658	The Northern Ireland Banknote (Designation of Authorised Bank) Regulations 2020
659 (C. 25)	The Traffic Management Act 2004 (Commencement No. 9) (England) Order 2020
660	The Health and Safety (Consequential Amendments) (EU Exit) Regulations 2020
661	The Investigatory Powers (Communications Data) (Relevant Public Authorities and Designated Senior Officers) (No. 2) Regulations 2020
662	The Vehicle Drivers (Certificates of Professional Competence) (Amendment) Regulations 2020The Vehicle Drivers (Certificates of Professional Competence) (Amendment) Regulations 2020
663	The Electric Scooter Trials and Traffic Signs (Coronavirus) Regulations and General Directions 2020
664	The Secure Training Centre (Coronavirus) (Amendment) Rules 2020
665	The Healthy Start Scheme and Welfare Food (Miscellaneous Amendments) (Amendment) (England) Regulations 2020
666	The Loans for Mortgage Interest (Transaction Fee) (Amendment) Regulations 2020
667	The Allocation of Housing and Homelessness (Eligibility) (England) (Amendment) Regulations 2020
668 (W. 151)	The A470 Trunk Road (Llanrwst, Conwy) (Temporary Prohibition of Waiting) Order 2020
669	The Air Navigation (Restriction of Flying) (Topcliffe) Regulations 2020
670	Not Allocated
671	The Pilotage and Port Services (Amendment) (EU Exit) Regulations 2020
672	The Child Benefit and Child Tax Credit (Persons of Northern Ireland) (Amendment) Regulations 2020
673	The Merchant Shipping (Safety of Navigation) Regulations 2020
674	The Health Protection (Notification) (Amendment) (No. 2) Regulations 2020
675 (W. 152)	The A470 Trunk Road (Coryton Interchange, Cardiff to Abercynon Roundabout, Rhondda Cynon Taf) (Temporary Traffic Prohibitions & Restrictions) Order 2020
676	The Product Safety and Metrology etc. (Amendment to Extent and Meaning of Market) (EU Exit) Regulations 2020
677	The Universal Credit (Northern Ireland Reciprocal Arrangements) Regulations 2020
678	The Pressure Vessels (Amendment) (Northern Ireland) (EU Exit) Regulations 2020
679	The Air Navigation (Restriction of Flying) (Royal Air Force Cranwell) Regulations 2020
680	The Global Human Rights Sanctions Regulations 2020
681	The Statutory Sick Pay (Coronavirus) (Suspension of Waiting Days and General Amendment) (No. 2) Regulations 2020
682	The Marketing of Seed, Plant and Propagating Material (England) Regulations 2020
683	The Social Security (Income-Related Benefits) (Persons of Northern Ireland – Family Members) (Amendment) Regulations 2020
684	Health Protection (Coronavirus, Restrictions) (No. 2) (England) Regulations 2020
685	Health Protection (Coronavirus, Restrictions) (Leicester) Regulations 2020 (revoked)
686 (W. 153)	The Health Protection (Coronavirus Restrictions) (Wales) (Amendment) (No. 7) Regulations 2020
687	Not Allocated
688	The Protection of Freedoms Act 2012 (Destruction, Retention and Use of Biometric Data) (Transitional, Transitory and Saving Provisions) (Amendment) Order 2020
689	The European Union (Regulated Professions Proportionality Assessment) Regulations 2020
690	The School Teachers’ Incentive Payments (England) (Amendment) Order 2020
691	Health Protection (Coronavirus, International Travel and Public Health Information) (England) (Amendment) Regulations 2020
692	The Civil Aviation (Insurance) (Amendment) (EU Exit) Regulations 2020
693	The Pension Protection Fund (Moratorium and Arrangements and Reconstructions for Companies in Financial Difficulty) Regulations 2020
694	The Air Traffic Management (Amendment etc.) (EU Exit) Regulations 2020
695	Not Allocated
696 (W. 154)	The European Union (Regulated Professions Proportionality Assessment) (Wales) Regulations 2020
697	The Electricity Capacity (Amendment etc.) (Coronavirus) Regulations 2020
698	The Value Added Tax (Zero Rate for Personal Protective Equipment) (Extension) (Coronavirus) Order 2020
699	Not Allocated
700	The Early Years Foundation Stage (Exemption from Learning and Development Requirements) and Childcare (Exemption from Registration) (Amendment) Regulations 2020

== 701–800 ==
Number	Title
701 (W. 155)	The A470 Trunk Road (Builth Wells to Llangurig, Powys) (Temporary Speed Restrictions & No Overtaking) Order 2020
702 (W. 156)	The A479 Trunk Road (Glanusk Park to Bronllys, Powys) (Temporary Prohibition of Traffic) Order 2020
703 (W. 157)	The A458 Trunk Road (East of Middletown to Nant-y-Dugoed, Powys) (Temporary Speed Restrictions & No Overtaking) Order 2020
704 (W. 158)	The A470 Trunk Road (Llangurig, Powys to Mallwyd, Gwynedd) (Temporary Speed Restrictions & No Overtaking) Order 2020
705	The Mali (Sanctions) (EU Exit) Regulations 2020
706	The Norfolk Vanguard Offshore Wind Farm Order 2020
707	The Iraq (Sanctions) (EU Exit) Regulations 2020
708 (W. 159)	The Education (Student Support) (Miscellaneous Amendments) (Wales) (No. 2) Regulations 2020
709	The Contracts for Difference (Electricity Supplier Obligations) (Amendment) (Coronavirus) Regulations 2020
710	The Charitable Incorporated Organisations (Insolvency and Dissolution) (Amendment) Regulations 2020 (revoked)
711	The Climate Change Agreements, CRC Energy Efficiency Scheme and Energy Savings Opportunity Scheme (Amendment) (EU Exit) Regulations 2020
712	The Childcare (Early Years Provision Free of Charge) (Extended Entitlement) (Coronavirus) (Amendment) Regulations 2020
713	The International Tax Enforcement (Disclosable Arrangements) (Coronavirus) (Amendment) Regulations 2020
714 (W. 160)	The Health Protection (Coronavirus, International Travel and Public Health Information to Travellers) (Wales) (Amendment) Regulations 2020
715	The Taxation of Chargeable Gains (Gilt-edged Securities) Order 2020
716	Not Allocated
717	The Companies (Shareholders' Rights to Voting Confirmations) Regulations 2020
718	The Air Navigation (Restriction of Flying) (Old Warden) (No. 2) Regulations 2020
719	Health Protection (Coronavirus, Restrictions) (No. 2) (England) (Amendment) Regulations 2020
720 (L. 15)	The Court Fees (Miscellaneous Amendments) Order 2020
721	The M23 Motorway (Gatwick Spur) (50 Miles Per Hour Speed Limit) Regulations 2020
722	The Air Navigation (Restriction of Flying) (Duxford) Regulations 2020
723 (W. 161)	The Countryside Access (Local Access Forums) (Wales) (Coronavirus) Regulations 2020
724	Health Protection (Coronavirus, International Travel) (England) (Amendment) (No. 2) Regulations 2020
725 (W. 162)	Health Protection (Coronavirus Restrictions) (No. 2) (Wales) Regulations 2020
726 (W. 163)	The Health Protection (Coronavirus, International Travel) (Wales) (Amendment) Regulations 2020
727	The Air Navigation (Restriction of Flying) (Royal Air Force Valley) Regulations 2020
728	The Value Added Tax (Reduced Rate) (Hospitality and Tourism) (Coronavirus) Order 2020
729 (W. 164)	The Relaxation of School Reporting Requirements (Wales) (Coronavirus) Regulations 2020
730	The Trade Remedies (Amendment) (EU Exit) (No. 2) Regulations 2020
731	The Town and Country Planning (Local Planning) (England) (Coronavirus) (Amendment) Regulations 2020
732	The River Tyne (Tunnels) (Revision of Tolls) Order 2020
733	The Yemen (Sanctions) (EU Exit) Regulations 2020
734	The Environmental Assessment of Plans and Programmes (Coronavirus) (Amendment) Regulations 2020
735	The Motor Vehicles (International Motor Insurance Card) (Amendment) Regulations 2020
736	The Immigration and Nationality (Fees) (Amendment) (No. 3) Regulations 2020
737 (W. 165)	The A470 Trunk Road (Powys/Merthyr Tydfil County Boundary to Builth Wells, Powys) (Temporary Speed Restrictions & No Overtaking) Order 2020
738	The Official Feed and Food Controls (England) (Amendment) Regulations 2020
739	The Home Loss Payments (Prescribed Amounts) (England) Regulations 2020
740 (W. 166)	The A44 Trunk Road (Llangurig, Powys to Aberystwyth, Ceredigion) (Temporary Speed Restrictions & No Overtaking) Order 2020
741 (W. 167)	The A489 Trunk Road (Newtown to Caersws, Powys) (Temporary Speed Restrictions & No Overtaking) Order 2020
742	The Marriage and Civil Partnership (Northern Ireland) Regulations 2020
743	The Terrorism Act 2000 (Proscribed Organisations) (Amendment) (No. 2) Order 2020
744	The Co-operative and Community Benefit Societies and Credit Unions (Arrangements, Reconstructions and Administration) (Amendment) and Consequential Amendments Order 2020
745 (W. 168)	The Town and Country Planning (Fees for Applications, Deemed Applications and Site Visits) (Wales) (Amendment) Regulations 2020
746	The A19 Downhill Lane Junction Development Consent Order 2020
747 (L. 16)	The Civil Procedure (Amendment No. 3) Rules 2020
748	The Enterprise Act 2002 (Share of Supply) (Amendment) Order 2020
749	The Public Service Vehicles (Open Data) (England) Regulations 2020
750	Health Protection (Coronavirus, Restrictions) (England) (No. 3) Regulations 2020
751 (L. 17)	The Civil Procedure (Amendment No. 4) (Coronavirus) Rules 2020
752 (W. 169)	The Health Protection (Coronavirus Restrictions) (No. 2) (Wales) (Amendment) Regulations 2020
753	The Sudan (Sanctions) (EU Exit) Regulations 2020
754	Health Protection (Coronavirus, Restrictions) (Leicester) (Amendment) Regulations 2020 (revoked)
755	The Town and Country Planning (General Permitted Development) (England) (Amendment) (No. 2) Order 2020
756	The Town and Country Planning (General Permitted Development) (England) (Amendment) (No. 3) Order 2020
757	Town and Country Planning (Use Classes) (Amendment) (England) Regulations 2020
758 (L. 18)	The Family Procedure (Amendment No. 2) Rules 2020
759 (L. 19)	The Criminal Procedure Rules 2020
760	The Direct Payments Ceilings Regulations 2020
761	The Air Navigation (Restriction of Flying) (Myrtle Road, Leicester) (Emergency) Regulations 2020
762 (W. 170)	The A489 Trunk Road (Cemmaes Road to Machynlleth, Powys) (Temporary Speed Restrictions and No Overtaking) Order 2020
763	The Enterprise Act 2002 (Turnover Test) (Amendment) Order 2020
764	The Infrastructure Planning (Publication and Notification of Applications etc.) (Coronavirus) (Amendment) Regulations 2020
765	The Town and Country Planning (Spatial Development Strategy) (Coronavirus) (Amendment) Regulations 2020
766 (C. 26)	The Investigatory Powers Act 2016 (Commencement No. 12) Regulations 2020
767	The Portsmouth Hospitals National Health Service Trust (Establishment) (Amendment) Order 2020
768	The Dudley and Walsall Mental Health Partnership National Health Service Trust (Establishment) (Amendment) Order 2020
769	The Plant Breeders’ Rights (Amendment) (EU Exit) Regulations 2020
770	The Air Navigation (Restriction of Flying) (Myrtle Road, Leicester) (Emergency) (Revocation) Regulations 2020
771	Not Allocated
772	The Power to Award Degrees etc. (TEC Partnership) Order 2020
773	The Global Human Rights Sanctions (Overseas Territories) Order 2020
774	The Global Human Rights Sanctions (Isle of Man) Order 2020
775	The Air Navigation (Restriction of Flying) (Headcorn) Regulations 2020
776	The Scotland Act 1998 (Agency Arrangements) (Specification) (Coronavirus) Order 2020
777	The Scotland Act 1998 (Agency Arrangements) (Specification) (Coronavirus) (No. 2) Order 2020
778 (W. 172)	The Coronavirus Act 2020 (Assured Tenancies and Assured Shorthold Tenancies, Extension of Notice Periods) (Amendment) (Wales) Regulations 2020
779	The National Minimum Wage (Offshore Employment) (Amendment) Order 2020
780	The Overseas Territories (Constitutional Modifications) Order 2020
781	The Community Infrastructure Levy (Coronavirus) (Amendment) (England) Regulations 2020
782	The Friendly Societies Act 1992 (Accounts) (Amendment) Order 2020
783	The Pension Protection Fund (Moratorium and Arrangements and Reconstructions for Companies in Financial Difficulty) (Amendment) Regulations 2020 (revoked)
784	The Air Traffic Management (Amendment etc.) (EU Exit) (No. 2) Regulations 2020
785	The Safety of Sports Grounds (Designation) (Amendment) (No. 3) Order 2020
786	The Railways (Miscellaneous Amendments, Revocations and Transitional Provisions) (EU Exit) Regulations 2020
787	The Health Protection (Coronavirus, Restrictions) (Leicester) (Amendment) (No. 2) Regulations 2020 (revoked)
788	The Health Protection (Coronavirus, Restrictions) (No. 2) (England) (Amendment) (No. 2) Regulations 2020
789 (W. 173)	The M4 Motorway (Junction 23a (Magor), Monmouthshire to Junction 34 (Miskin), Rhondda Cynon Taf) & the A48(M) Motorway (Junction 29 (Castleton), Newport to Junction 29A (St Mellons), Cardiff) (Temporary Prohibition of Vehicles) Order 2020
790	The Motor Vehicles (Tests) (Amendment) (Coronavirus) (No. 2) Regulations 2020
791	Health Protection (Coronavirus, Wearing of Face Coverings in a Relevant Place) (England) Regulations 2020
792 (C. 27)	Counter-Terrorism and Border Security Act 2019 (Commencement No. 1) Regulations 2020
793	The Single Digital Gateway Regulation (Revocation) (EU Exit) Regulations 2020
794 (W. 174)	The Land Transaction Tax (Temporary Variation of Rates and Bands for Residential Property Transactions) (Wales) Regulations 2020
795	The Port Examination Codes of Practice and National Security Determinations Guidance Regulations 2020
796	The Online Intermediation Services for Business Users (Amendment) (EU Exit) Regulations 2020
797	The Northern Ireland Act 1998 (Section 75 – Designation of Public Authority) Order 2020
798	The Aviation Security (Amendment) (EU Exit) Regulations 2020
799	The Health Protection (Coronavirus, International Travel) (England) (Amendment) (No. 3) Regulations 2020
800	The Health Protection (Coronavirus, Restrictions) (Blackburn with Darwen and Luton) Regulations 2020 (revoked)

== 801–900 ==
Number	Title
801	The Competition Appeal Tribunal (Coronavirus) (Recording and Broadcasting) Order 2020
802 (W. 175)	The Traffic Orders Procedure (Amendment) (Wales) (Coronavirus) Regulations 2020
803 (W. 176)	The Health Protection (Coronavirus Restrictions) (No. 2) (Wales) (Amendment) (No. 2) Regulations 2020
804 (W. 177)	The Health Protection (Coronavirus, International Travel) (Wales) (Amendment) (No. 2) Regulations 2020
805	The Health Protection (Coronavirus, International Travel) (England) (Amendment) (No. 4) Regulations 2020
806	The Barnsley, Doncaster, Rotherham and Sheffield Combined Authority (Functions and Amendment) Order 2020
807	The Progress Power (Gas Fired Power Station) (Amendment) Order 2020
808	The Local Authorities and Police and Crime Panels (Coronavirus) (Flexibility of Local Authority and Police and Crime Panel Meetings) (England and Wales) (Amendment) Regulations 2020
809	The Local Government (Structural Changes) (Coronavirus) (Amendment) Regulations 2020
810 (W. 178)	The A483 Trunk Road (Powys/Carmarthenshire County Boundary to Llanymynech, Powys) (Temporary Speed Restrictions & No Overtaking) Order 2020
811	The M6 Toll Motorway and the M42 Motorway (Junction 8 to Junction 7) (Warwickshire) (Temporary Restriction of Traffic) Order 2020
812	The Road Vehicles (Certificates of Temporary Exemption) Regulations 2020
813	The Health Protection (Coronavirus, International Travel) (England) (Amendment) (No. 5) Regulations 2020
814	The Employment Rights Act 1996 (Coronavirus, Calculation of a Week's Pay) Regulations 2020
815	The Electricity (Individual Exemptions from the Requirement for a Transmission Licence) (Coronavirus) Order 2020
816	The Education (Pupil Registration) (England) (Coronavirus) (Amendment) (No. 2) Regulations 2020
817 (W. 179)	The Health Protection (Coronavirus, International Travel) (Wales) (Amendment) (No. 3) Regulations 2020
818	The Road Vehicles (Approval) Regulations 2020
819	The Health Protection (Coronavirus, International Travel) (England) (Amendment) (No. 6) Regulations 2020
820 (W. 180)	The Health Protection (Coronavirus Restrictions) (No. 2) (Wales) (Amendment) (No. 3) Regulations 2020
821	The Nursing and Midwifery Council (Coronavirus) (Amendment) (No. 2) Rules Order of Council 2020
822	The Health Protection (Coronavirus, Restrictions) (Blackburn with Darwen and Bradford) Regulations 2020 (revoked)
823	The Health Protection (Coronavirus, Restrictions) (Leicester) (Amendment) (No. 3) Regulations 2020 (revoked)
824	The Health Protection (Coronavirus, Restrictions) (Leicester) (No. 2) Regulations 2020
825	The Persons Subject to Immigration Control (Housing Authority Accommodation and Homelessness) (Amendment) Order 2020
826	The Universal Credit (Managed Migration Pilot and Miscellaneous Amendments) (Amendment) Regulations 2020
827	The Universal Credit (Exceptions to the Requirement not to be receiving Education) (Amendment) Regulations 2020
828	The Health Protection (Coronavirus, Restrictions on Gatherings) (North of England) Regulations 2020 (revoked)
829	The Statutory Sick Pay (General) (Coronavirus Amendment) (No. 5) Regulations 2020
830 (W. 181)	The A40 Trunk Road (Gibraltar Tunnels, Monmouth, Monmouthshire) (Temporary Traffic Prohibitions & Restrictions) Order 2020
831	The Air Navigation (Restriction of Flying) (Loch Fyne) (Emergency) Regulations 2020
832	The Rating Lists (Valuation Date) (England) Order 2020
833 (W. 182)	The Marketing of Seed, Plant and Propagating Material (Wales) Regulations 2020
834	The Air Navigation (Restriction of Flying) (Loch Fyne) (Emergency) (Revocation) Regulations 2020
835	The Church of England (Miscellaneous Provisions) Measure 2020 Commencement (No. 1) Order 2020
836	The Town and Country Planning (Fees for Applications, Deemed Applications, Requests and Site Visits) (England) (Amendment) Regulations 2020
837 (W. 183)	The A458 Trunk Road (Llangadfan, Powys) (40 mph & Part-time 20 mph Speed Limits) Order 2020
838 (W. 184)	The A466 Trunk Road (Between Newhouse Interchange and Highbeech Roundabout, Chepstow, Monmouthshire) (Temporary Prohibition of Vehicles and Cyclists) Order 2020
839	The Health Protection (Coronavirus, Wearing of Face Coverings in a Relevant Place) (England) (Amendment) Regulations 2020
840 (W. 185)	The Health Protection (Coronavirus, International Travel) (Wales) (Amendment) (No. 4) Regulations 2020
841	The Health Protection (Coronavirus, International Travel) (England) (Amendment) (No. 7) Regulations 2020
842	The Education (Induction Arrangements for School Teachers) (England) (Coronavirus) (Amendment) Regulations 2020
843 (W. 186)	The Health Protection (Coronavirus Restrictions) (No. 2) (Wales) (Amendment) (No. 4) Regulations 2020
844	The Education (National Curriculum Assessment Arrangements, Attainment Targets and Programmes of Study) and (Pupil Information and School Performance Information) (Amendment) (England) Regulations 2020
845	Not Allocated
846	The Health Protection (Coronavirus, Restrictions on Gatherings) (North of England) (Amendment) Regulations 2020 (revoked)
847	The Immingham Open Cycle Gas Turbine Order 2020
848 (W. 187)	The Education (School Day and School Year) (Wales) (Amendment) (Coronavirus) Regulations 2020
849	The Guarantees of Origin of Electricity Produced from High-efficiency Cogeneration and Renewables Obligation (Amendment) (EU Exit) Regulations 2020
850 (W. 188)	The A55 Trunk Road (Junction 10 (Caernarfon Road Interchange) to Junction 11 (Llys y Gwynt Interchange), Bangor, Gwynedd) (Temporary Prohibition of Vehicles, Cyclists & Pedestrians) Order 2020
851	The Dogger Bank Teesside A and B Offshore Wind Farm (Amendment) Order 2020
852	The Product Safety and Metrology (Amendment) (EU Exit) Regulations 2020
853	The Higher Education (Fee Limits and Student Support) (England) (Coronavirus) Regulations 2020
854	The M48 Motorway (Severn Bridge Half Marathon) (Temporary Prohibition of Traffic) Order 2020
855	The Offshore Chemicals and Offshore Petroleum Activities (Oil Pollution Prevention and Control) (Coronavirus) (Amendment) Regulations 2020
856	The Charitable Incorporated Organisations (Insolvency and Dissolution) (Amendment) (No. 2) Regulations 2020
857	The Air Navigation (Restriction of Flying) (Stonehaven) (Emergency) Regulations 2020
858	The Air Navigation (Restriction of Flying) (Stonehaven) (Emergency) (Amendment) Regulations 2020
859	The Town and Country Planning (Use Classes) (Amendment) (England) (No. 2) Regulations 2020
860	The Terrorism Act 2000 (Video Recording with Sound of Interviews and Associated Code of Practice) (Northern Ireland) Order 2020
861	The Air Navigation (Restriction of Flying) (Stonehaven) (Emergency) (Revocation) Regulations 2020
862	The Thames Water Utilities Limited (Thames Tideway Tunnel) (Amendment) (No. 2) Order 2020
863	Health Protection (Coronavirus, Restrictions) (No. 2) (England) (Amendment) (No. 3) Regulations 2020 (revoked)
864	The Product Safety and Metrology etc. (EU Withdrawal and EEA EFTA Separation Agreements) (EU Exit) Regulations 2020
865	The Health Protection (Coronavirus, Restrictions on Gatherings) (North of England) (Amendment) (No. 2) Regulations 2020 (revoked)
866	Health Protection (Coronavirus, International Travel) (England) (Amendment) (No. 8) Regulations 2020
867 (W. 189)	The Health Protection (Coronavirus Restrictions) (No. 2) (Wales) (Amendment) (No. 5) Regulations 2020
868 (W. 190)	The Health Protection (Coronavirus, International Travel) (Wales) (Amendment) (No. 5) Regulations 2020
869	The Air Navigation (Restriction of Flying) (Scatsta) (Emergency) Regulations 2020
870	The Power to Award Degrees etc. (BPP University Limited) Order of Council 2013 (Amendment) Order 2020
871	The Power to Award Degrees etc. (The Ashridge (Bonar Law Memorial) Trust) Order of Council 2014 (Amendment) Order 2020
872	The Power to Award Degrees etc. (Warwickshire College) Order of Council 2014 (Amendment) Order 2020
873	The Power to Award Degrees etc. (Arden University Limited) Order 2020
874	The Air Navigation (Restriction of Flying) (Scatsta) (Emergency) (Revocation) Regulations 2020
875	The Health Protection (Coronavirus, Restrictions) (Leicester) (No. 2) (Amendment) Regulations 2020 (revoked)
876	The Air Navigation (Restriction of Flying) (Alrewas) Regulations 2020
877 (W. 191)	The A487 Trunk Road (Aberystwyth, Ceredigion) (Temporary Prohibition of Vehicles) Order 2020
878 (W. 192)	The A5 Trunk Road (Nant Ffrancon, Gwynedd) (Prohibition of Waiting) Order 2020
879	The Drax Power (Generating Stations) (Correction) Order 2020
880 (W. 193)	The A4232 Trunk Road (Junction 33 (Capel Llanilltern) to Culverhouse Cross, Cardiff) (Temporary Prohibition of Vehicles) Order 2020
881	The Health Protection (Coronavirus, International Travel) (England) (Amendment) (No. 9) Regulations 2020
882	Health Protection (Coronavirus, Wearing of Face Coverings in a Relevant Place) (England) (Amendment) (No. 2) Regulations 2020
883	Not Allocated
884 (W. 195)	The Health Protection (Coronavirus Restrictions) (No. 2) (Wales) (Amendment) (No. 6) Regulations 2020
885	The National Health Service (Coronavirus) (Charges and Further Amendments Relating to the Provision of Primary Care Services During a Pandemic etc.) Regulations 2020
886 (W. 196)	The Health Protection (Coronavirus, International Travel) (Wales) (Amendment) (No. 6) Regulations 2020
887	The Fertilising Products Regulations 2020
888 (C. 28)	The Youth Justice and Criminal Evidence Act 1999 (Commencement No. 18) Order 2020
889 (L. 20)	The Civil Procedure (Amendment No. 5) (Coronavirus) Rules 2020
890	Health Protection (Coronavirus, International Travel) (England) (Amendment) (No. 10) Regulations 2020
891 (W. 197)	The Curriculum Requirements (Amendment of paragraph 7(6) of Schedule 17 to the Coronavirus Act 2020) (Wales) Regulations 2020
892	The Statutory Sick Pay (General) (Coronavirus Amendment) (No. 6) Regulations 2020
893	The Local Government Pension Scheme (Amendment) (No. 2) Regulations 2020
894	The School Information (England) (Amendment) Regulations 2020
895	The Town and Country Planning (Use Classes) (Amendment) (England) (No. 3) Regulations 2020
896 (W. 198)	The A487 Trunk Road (Pembrokeshire/Ceredigion County Boundary near Cardigan, Ceredigion to the Powys/Gwynedd County Boundary at Dyfi Bridge, Powys) (Temporary Speed Restrictions and No Overtaking) Order 2020
897	The Health Protection (Coronavirus, Restrictions) (North of England) (Amendment) Regulations 2020 (revoked)
898	The Health Protection (Coronavirus, Restrictions) (Blackburn with Darwen and Bradford) (Amendment) Regulations 2020 (revoked)
899 (W. 199)	The A40 Trunk Road (Carreg Fawr Culvert, north of Square and Compass Roundabout near Llangadog, Carmarthenshire) (Temporary Prohibition of Vehicles) Order 2020
900 (W. 200)	The A483 Trunk Road (Pen-y-banc Road, Ammanford, Carmarthenshire) (Prohibition of Waiting) Order 2020

== 901–1000 ==
Number	Title
901 (W. 201)	The A40 Trunk Road (Glangrwyney to Pont Wen, Halfway, Powys) (Temporary Speed Restrictions and No Overtaking) Order 2020
902 (W. 202)	The A479 Trunk Road (Glanusk Park to Llyswen, Powys) (Temporary Speed Restrictions & No Overtaking) Order 2020
903	The Criminal Legal Aid (Remuneration) (Amendment) Regulations 2020
904	The Waste (Circular Economy) (Amendment) Regulations 2020
905	Not Allocated
906	Health Protection (Coronavirus, Wearing of Face Coverings in a Relevant Place and on Public Transport) (England) (Amendment) Regulations 2020
907	Health Protection (Coronavirus) (Restrictions on Holding of Gatherings and Amendment) (England) Regulations 2020
908	The School Discipline (England) (Coronavirus) (Pupil Exclusions and Reviews) (Amendment) (No. 2) Regulations 2020
909	The Adoption and Children (Coronavirus) (Amendment) (No.2) Regulations 2020
910 (W. 203)	The A494 Trunk Road (Llanycil, Gwynedd) (Temporary Prohibition of Vehicles, Cyclists and Pedestrians) Order 2020
911	The National Health Service (General Medical Services Contracts and Personal Medical Services Agreements) (Amendment) (No. 2) Regulations 2020
912 (W. 204)	The Health Protection (Coronavirus Restrictions) (No. 2) (Wales) (Amendment) (No. 7) Regulations 2020
913	The Health Protection (Coronavirus, International Travel) (England) (Amendment) (No. 11) Regulations 2020
914	The Coronavirus Act 2020 (Residential Tenancies: Protection from Eviction) (Amendment) (England) Regulations 2020
915	The Channel Tunnel (International Arrangements and Miscellaneous Provisions) (Amendment) Order 2020
916	The Channel Tunnel (Arrangements with the Kingdom of the Netherlands) Order 2020
917 (W. 205)	The Health Protection (Coronavirus, International Travel) (Wales) (Amendment) (No. 7) Regulations 2020
918 (W. 206)	The Education (Student Support) (Postgraduate Master's Degrees) (Wales) (Amendment) (Coronavirus) Regulations 2020
919	The Designation of Schools Having a Religious Character (Independent Schools) (England) Order 2020
920	The Designation of Schools Having a Religious Character (England) Order 2020
921	Health Protection (Coronavirus, Restrictions) (Greencore) Regulations 2020
922	The Income Tax (Care Leaver's Apprenticeship Bursary Payment) Regulations 2020
923	The Social Security (Contributions) (Amendment No. 4) Regulations 2020
924	The Assured Tenancies and Agricultural Occupancies (Forms) (England) (Amendment) and Suspension (Coronavirus) Regulations 2020
925 (W. 207)	The A4042 Trunk Road (Pontypool Roundabout, Torfaen to Little Mill Junction, Monmouthshire) (Temporary Prohibition of Vehicles and Cyclists) Order 2020
926	The Postponed Elections and Referendums (Coronavirus) and Policy Development Grants (Amendment) Regulations 2020
927	The Welfare Reform (Northern Ireland) Order 2015 (Cessation of Transitory Provision) Order 2020
928	The Town and Country Planning (Border Facilities and Infrastructure) (EU Exit) (England) Special Development Order 2020
929 (C. 29)	The Bank of England and Financial Services Act 2016 (Commencement No. 6 and Transitional Provisions) (Amendment) Regulations 2020
930	The Health Protection (Coronavirus, Restrictions) (Blackburn with Darwen and Bradford) (Amendment) (No. 2) Regulations 2020 (revoked)
931	The Health Protection (Coronavirus, Restrictions) (North of England) (Amendment) (No. 2) Regulations 2020 (revoked)
932 (W. 208)	The A483 Trunk Road (Llandybie Road and College Street, Ammanford, Carmarthenshire) (Prohibition of Waiting) Order 2020
933	The Competition Act 1998 (Coronavirus) (Public Policy Exclusions) (Amendment and Revocation) Order 2020
934	The Finance Act 2008, Section 135 (Coronavirus) Order 2020
935	The Health Protection (Coronavirus, Restrictions) (Blackburn with Darwen and Bradford) (Amendment) (No. 3) Regulations 2020 (revoked)
936 (W. 209)	The A458 Trunk Road (Salop Road, Welshpool, Powys) (Temporary Prohibition of Vehicles) Order 2020
937	Not Allocated
938	Not Allocated
939	The Early Years Foundation Stage (Learning and Development and Welfare Requirements) (Coronavirus) (Amendment) (No. 2) Regulations 2020
940	The Transfer of Functions (Digital Government) Order 2020
941	The Tax Credits (Coronavirus, Miscellaneous Amendments) (No. 2) Regulations 2020
942	The Transfer of Functions (Secretary of State for Foreign, Commonwealth and Development Affairs) Order 2020
943	The Insolvency (Moratorium) (Special Administration for Energy Licensees) Regulations 2020
944 (W. 210)	The Health Protection (Coronavirus, International Travel) (Wales) (Amendment) (No. 8) Regulations 2020
945	The Motor Vehicles (Compulsory Insurance and Rights Against Insurers) (Amendment) (EU Exit) Regulations 2020
946	The Civil Enforcement of Parking Contraventions Designation (No. 2) Order 2020
947 (W. 211)	The A470 Trunk Road (Coryton Interchange, Cardiff to north of Taffs Well Interchange, Rhondda Cynon Taf) (Temporary 50 mph Speed Limit) Order 2020
948	The Afghanistan (Sanctions) (EU Exit) Regulations 2020
949 (W. 212)	The A489 & A483 Trunk Roads (Newtown Bypass, Powys) (Temporary Prohibition of Vehicles, Pedestrians and Cyclists) Order 2020
950	The Sanctions (EU Exit) (Miscellaneous Amendments) (No.3) Regulations 2020
951	The Sanctions (EU Exit) (Miscellaneous Amendments) (No. 4) Regulations 2020
952	The Wills Act 1837 (Electronic Communications) (Amendment) (Coronavirus) Order 2020
953	The Prosecution of Offences (Custody Time Limits) (Coronavirus) (Amendment) Regulations 2020
954	The Health Protection (Coronavirus, Restrictions) (Blackburn with Darwen and Bradford, Leicester, and North of England) (Amendment) Regulations 2020 (revoked)
955 (W. 213)	The Healthy Start Scheme (Description of Healthy Start Food) (Wales) (Miscellaneous Amendments) Regulations 2020
956	The M1 Motorway (Junctions 13 to 16) (Variable Speed Limits) Regulations 2020
957	The Feed-in Tariffs (Amendment) (Coronavirus) (No. 2) Order 2020
958	The Climate Change Agreements (Administration and Eligible Facilities) (Amendment) Regulations 2020
959	The Health Protection (Coronavirus, International Travel) (England) (Amendment) (No. 12) Regulations 2020
960 (W. 214)	The Business Tenancies (Extension of Protection from Forfeiture etc.) (Wales) (Coronavirus) (No. 2) Regulations 2020
961 (W. 215)	The Health Protection (Coronavirus Restrictions) (No. 2) (Wales) (Amendment) (No. 8) (Caerphilly) Regulations 2020
962 (W. 216)	The Health Protection (Coronavirus, International Travel) (Wales) (Amendment) (No. 9) Regulations 2020
963	The Co-operative and Community Benefit Societies and Credit Unions (Arrangements, Reconstructions and Administration) (Amendment) (No. 2) Order 2020
964	The Cleaner Road Transport Vehicles (Amendment) (EU Exit) Regulations 2020
965	The Education (Information About Individual Pupils) (England) (Amendment) Regulations 2020
966	The Immigration and Nationality (Replacement of Tier 4 and Fees) and Passport (Fees) (Amendment) Regulations 2020
967	The Customs (Bulk Customs Declaration and Miscellaneous Amendments) (EU Exit) Regulations 2020
968 (W. 217)	The A55 Trunk Road (Junction 2 (Tŷ Mawr Interchange) to Junction 5 (Treban Interchange), Anglesey) (Temporary Prohibition of Vehicles, Cyclists & Pedestrians) Order 2020
969	The London Borough of Islington (Electoral Changes) Order 2020
970	The Air Navigation (Restriction of Flying) (Duxford) (No. 2) Regulations 2020
971	The Environmental Protection (Plastic Straws, Cotton Buds and Stirrers) (England) Regulations 2020
972	The Industrial Training Levy (Engineering Construction Industry Training Board) Order 2020
973	The Coronavirus (Retention of Fingerprints and DNA Profiles in the Interests of National Security) (No. 2) Regulations 2020
974	The Health Protection (Coronavirus, Restrictions) (Bolton) Regulations 2020 (revoked)
975	The Return of Cultural Objects (Revocation) (EU Exit) (Amendment) Regulations 2020
976	The Income-related Benefits (Subsidy to Authorities) Amendment Order 2020
977	Not Allocated
978	Not Allocated
979	The Finance Act 2009, Sections 101 and 102 (Disguised Remuneration Repayment Scheme) (Appointed Day and Consequential Amendment) Order 2020
980	The Health Protection (Coronavirus, International Travel) (England) (Amendment) (No. 13) Regulations 2020
981 (W. 220)	The Health Protection (Coronavirus, International Travel) (Wales) (Amendment) (No. 10) Regulations 2020
982	The Football Spectators (Seating) Order 2020
983	The Insolvency Act 1986 (HMRC Debts: Priority on Insolvency) Regulations 2020
984 (W. 221)	The Health Protection (Coronavirus Restrictions) (Functions of Local Authorities) (Wales) Regulations 2020
985 (W. 222)	The Health Protection (Coronavirus Restrictions) (No. 2) (Wales) (Amendment) (No. 9) Regulations 2020
986	Health Protection (Coronavirus, Restrictions) (No. 2) (England) (Amendment) (No. 4) Regulations 2020
987	The Health Protection (Coronavirus, Restrictions) (Leicester) (No. 2) (Amendment) (No. 2) Regulations 2020 (revoked)
988	The Health Protection (Coronavirus, Restrictions) (Birmingham, Sandwell and Solihull) Regulations 2020 (revoked)
989	The Social Security (Scotland) Act 2018 (Young Carer Grants, Short-Term assistance and Winter Heating Assistance) (Consequential Provision and Modifications) Order 2020
990	The Pension Protection Fund (Moratorium and Arrangements and Reconstructions for Companies in Financial Difficulty) (Amendment and Revocation) Regulations 2020
991	The Money Laundering and Terrorist Financing (Amendment) (EU Exit) Regulations 2020
992	The European Union (Withdrawal Agreement) (Relevant International Agreements) (EU Exit) Regulations 2020
993	Not Allocated
994	The Business Tenancies (Protection from Forfeiture: Relevant Period) (Coronavirus) (England) (No. 2) Regulations 2020
995	The Taxes (Interest Rate) (Amendment No. 2) Regulations 2020
996	The MARD (Amendment) (EU Exit) Regulations 2020
997	The Air Navigation (Restriction of Flying) (Duxford) (No. 2) (Revocation) Regulations 2020
998	The Fertilisers and Ammonium Nitrate Material (Amendment) (EU Exit) Regulations 2020
999	The Air Navigation (Restriction of Flying) (Duxford) (Revocation) Regulations 2020
1000	The Merchant Shipping (Consequential Amendments) (EU Exit) Regulations 2020

== 1001–1100 ==
Number	Title
1001	The Civil Legal Aid (Remuneration) (Amendment) (No. 2) (Coronavirus) Regulations 2020
1002	The Taking Control of Goods (Amendment) (Coronavirus) Regulations 2020
1003	The Employment Tribunals (Constitution and Rules of Procedure) (Early Conciliation: Exemptions and Rules of Procedure) (Amendment) Regulations 2020
1004 (W. 223)	The Planning Applications (Temporary Modifications and Disapplication) (No. 2) (Wales) (Coronavirus) Order 2020
1005	Health Protection (Coronavirus, Collection of Contact Details etc and Related Requirements) Regulations 2020
1006	The Electricity and Gas (Internal Markets and Network Codes) (Amendment etc.) (EU Exit) Regulations 2020
1007 (W. 224)	The Health Protection (Coronavirus Restrictions) (No. 2) (Wales) (Amendment) (No. 10) (Rhondda Cynon Taf) Regulations 2020
1008	Health Protection (Coronavirus, Restrictions) (Obligations of Hospitality Undertakings) (England) Regulations 2020
1009	The Functions of the Investigatory Powers Commissioner (Oversight of the Data Access Agreement between the United Kingdom and the United States of America and of functions exercisable under the Crime (Overseas Production Orders) Act 2019) Regulations 2020
1010	The Health Protection (Coronavirus, Restrictions) (North East of England) Regulations 2020 (revoked)
1011 (W. 225)	The Health Protection (Coronavirus Restrictions) (Functions of Local Authorities etc.) (Wales) Regulations 2020
1012	The Health Protection (Coronavirus, Restrictions) (North East of England) (Amendment) Regulations 2020 (revoked)
1013	The Health Protection (Coronavirus, International Travel) (England) (Amendment) (No. 14) Regulations 2020
1014	The Official Controls (Plant Health and Genetically Modified Organisms) (England) (Amendment) (No. 2) Regulations 2020
1015 (W. 226)	The Health Protection (Coronavirus, International Travel) (Wales) (Amendment) (No. 11) Regulations 2020
1016	The Electricity and Gas etc. (Amendment) (EU Exit) Regulations 2020
1017	The Air Navigation (Restriction of Flying) (Middle Hope Beach) (Emergency) Regulations 2020
1018	The Air Navigation (Restriction of Flying) (Middle Hope Beach) (Emergency) (Revocation) Regulations 2020
1019	Health Protection (Coronavirus, Restrictions) (Protected Areas and Linked Childcare Households) (Amendment) Regulations 2020
1020	The School Teachers' Pay and Conditions (England) Order 2020
1021	Health Protection (Coronavirus, Wearing of Face Coverings in a Relevant Place and on Public Transport) (England) (Amendment) (No. 2) Regulations 2020
1022 (W. 227)	The Health Protection (Coronavirus Restrictions) (No. 2) (Wales) (Amendment) (No. 11) (Blaenau Gwent, Bridgend, Merthyr Tydfil and Newport etc.) Regulations 2020
1023	Fatal Accidents Act 1976 (Remedial) Order 2020
1024	The Poole Hospital NHS Foundation Trust and The Royal Bournemouth and Christchurch Hospitals NHS Foundation Trust (Dissolution and Transfer of Property and Liabilities) Order 2020
1025 (W. 228)	The A483 Trunk Road (Broad Street & High Street, Builth Wells, Powys) (Temporary Prohibition of Vehicles) Order 2020
1026	Health Protection (Coronavirus, Wearing of Face Coverings in a Relevant Place and on Public Transport) (England) (Amendment) (No. 3) Regulations 2020
1027	The Royal Parks and Other Open Spaces (Amendment) etc. Regulations 2020
1028	Health Protection (Coronavirus, Wearing of Face Coverings in a Relevant Place) (England) (Amendment) (No. 3) Regulations 2020
1029	Health Protection (Coronavirus, Restrictions) (No. 2) (England) (Amendment) (No. 5) Regulations 2020
1030	The Statutory Sick Pay (Coronavirus) (Funding of Employers’ Liabilities) (Amendment) Regulations and the Statutory Sick Pay (Coronavirus) (Funding of Employers’ Liabilities) (Northern Ireland) (Amendment) Regulations 2020
1031	Corporate Insolvency and Governance Act 2020 (Coronavirus) (Extension of the Relevant Period) Regulations 2020
1032	The Representation of the People (Electoral Registers Publication Date) Regulations 2020
1033	Corporate Insolvency and Governance Act 2020 (Coronavirus) (Early Termination of Certain Temporary Provisions) Regulations 2020
1034	The Mobile Homes (Requirement for Manager of Site to be Fit and Proper Person) (England) Regulations 2020
1035 (W. 229)	The Health Protection (Coronavirus Restrictions) (No. 2) (Wales) (Amendment) (No. 12) Regulations 2020
1036	The Cross-border Parcel Delivery Services (Amendment) (No.2) (EU Exit) Regulations 2020
1037	The Investigatory Powers (Communications Data) (Relevant Public Authorities and Designated Senior Officers) Regulations 2020
1038	The Professional Qualifications and Services (Amendments and Miscellaneous Provisions) (EU Exit) Regulations 2020
1039	The Health Protection (Coronavirus, International Travel) (England) (Amendment) (No. 15) Regulations 2020
1040 (W. 230)	The Health Protection (Coronavirus Restrictions) (No. 2) (Wales) (Amendment) (No. 13) (Llanelli etc.) Regulations 2020
1041	The Health Protection (Coronavirus, Restrictions) (Protected Areas and Restriction on Businesses) (Amendment) Regulations 2020
1042 (W. 231)	The Health Protection (Coronavirus, International Travel) (Wales) (Amendment) (No. 12) Regulations 2020
1043 (W. 232)	The Health Protection (Coronavirus Restrictions) (No. 2) (Wales) (Amendment) (No. 14) (Cardiff and Swansea) Regulations 2020
1044 (W. 233)	The Coronavirus Act 2020 (Residential Tenancies: Protection from Eviction) (Wales) Regulations 2020
1045	Health Protection (Coronavirus, Restrictions) (Self-Isolation) (England) Regulations 2020
1046	Health Protection (Coronavirus, Restrictions) (Obligations of Undertakings) (England) (Amendment) Regulations 2020
1047	The Immigration (Residential Accommodation) (Prescribed Requirements and Codes of Practice) (Amendment) Order 2020
1048 (W. 234) (C. 30)	The Public Health (Wales) Act 2017 (Commencement No. 5) Order 2020
1049 (W. 235)	The Health Protection (Coronavirus Restrictions) (No. 2) (Wales) (Amendment) (No. 15) (Neath Port Talbot, Torfaen and Vale of Glamorgan) Regulations 2020
1050	The Intellectual Property (Amendment etc.) (EU Exit) Regulations 2020
1051	The Town and Country Planning (Pre-application Consultation) Order 2020
1052 (C. 31) (W. 236)	The Senedd and Elections (Wales) Act 2020 (Commencement) Order 2020
1053	The Reinforcement to the North Shropshire Electricity Distribution Network (Correction) Order 2020
1054	The International Monetary Fund (Limit on Lending) Order 2020
1055	The Equivalence Determinations for Financial Services (Amendment etc.) (EU Exit) Regulations 2020
1056 (W. 237)	The A470 Trunk Road (Storey Arms, Powys) (Temporary Part-time 30 mph Speed Limit) Order 2020
1057	The Health Protection (Coronavirus, Restrictions) (North of England, North East and North West of England and Obligations of Undertakings (England) etc.) (Amendment) Regulations 2020
1058 (W. 238)	The A487 Trunk Road (Aberaeron, Ceredigion) (40 mph & 20 mph Speed Limits) Order 2020
1059	The Non-Contentious Probate (Amendment) Rules 2020
1060	The Official Controls (Plant Health and Genetically Modified Organisms) (England) (Amendment) (No. 3) Regulations 2020
1061	The Power to Award Degrees etc. (Regent's University London Limited) Order 2020
1062	The Audiovisual Media Services Regulations 2020
1063	The Safety of Sports Grounds (Designation) (Amendment) (England) (No. 4) Order 2020
1064 (W. 239)	The Representation of the People (Electoral Register Publication Date) (Wales) (Coronavirus) Regulations 2020
1065	The Social Security Contributions (Disregarded Payments) (Coronavirus) (England) Regulations 2020
1066 (W. 240)	The Health Protection (Coronavirus Restrictions) (No. 2) (Wales) (Amendment) (No. 16) (Conwy, Denbighshire, Flintshire and Wrexham) Regulations 2020
1067	The Midland Metro (Wednesbury to Brierley Hill Land Acquisition) Order 2020
1068	The Wireless Telegraphy (Licence Charges) Regulations 2020
1069	The Square Kilometre Array Observatory (Immunities and Privileges) Order 2020
1070	The Health Protection (Coronavirus, International Travel) (England) (Amendment) (No. 16) Regulations 2020
1071	NHS Counter Fraud Authority (Establishment, Constitution, and Staff and Other Transfer Provisions) (Amendment) Order 2020
1072	The Mental Health (Hospital, Guardianship and Treatment) (England) (Amendment) Regulations 2020
1073 (W. 241)	The National Health Service (Pharmaceutical Services) (Wales) Regulations 2020
1074	The Health Protection (Coronavirus, Restrictions) (North of England and North East and North West of England etc.) (Amendment) Regulations 2020 (revoked)
1075	The Great Yarmouth Third River Crossing Development Consent Order 2020
1076	The Health Protection (Coronavirus, International Travel) (England) (Amendment) (No. 17) Regulations 2020
1077	The Prison and Young Offender Institution (Coronavirus, etc.) (Amendment) (No. 3) Rules 2020
1078	Proceeds of Crime Act 2002 (References to Financial Investigators) (Amendment) (England and Wales) Order 2020
1079 (W. 242)	The Health Protection (Coronavirus Restrictions) (No. 2) (Wales) (Amendment) (No. 17) Regulations 2020
1080 (W. 243)	The Health Protection (Coronavirus, International Travel) (Wales) (Amendment) (No. 13) Regulations 2020
1081	The Sentencing (Pre-consolidation Amendments) Act 2020 (Exception) Regulations 2020
1082 (W. 244)	The Adoption and Fostering (Wales) (Miscellaneous Amendments) (Coronavirus) Regulations 2020
1083 (W. 245)	The A465 Trunk Road (Rhigos, Rhondda Cynon Taf to Glynneath, Neath Port Talbot) (Temporary Traffic Prohibitions & Restrictions) Order 2020
1084 (W. 246)	The A4042 Trunk Road (Mamhilad Roundabout to Croes-Y-Pant Lane, Penperlleni, Torfaen) (Temporary Traffic Prohibitions and Speed Limits) Order 2020
1085	The Jobseekers (Back to Work Schemes) Act 2013 (Remedial) Order 2020
1086	The Immigration (Health Charge) (Amendment) Order 2020
1087	Ministry of Defence Police (Conduct, Performance and Appeals Tribunals) Regulations 2020
1088	The Customs (Transitional Arrangements) (EU Exit) Regulations 2020
1089	The Official Controls (Plant Health and Genetically Modified Organisms) (England) (Amendment) (No. 4) Regulations 2020
1090	The Health Protection (Coronavirus, Public Health Information for Passengers Travelling to England) (Amendment) Regulations 2020
1091	The INSPIRE (Amendment) (EU Exit) Regulations 2020
1092 (W. 247)	The A458 Trunk Road (Llanfair Caereinion, Powys) (Temporary Prohibition of Vehicles) Order 2020
1093	The Births, Deaths and Marriages (Records and Fees) (Amendment) Regulations 2020
1094	The Health Protection (Coronavirus, International Travel) (England) (Amendment) (No. 18) Regulations 2020
1095	The Air Quality (Domestic Solid Fuels Standards) (England) Regulations 2020
1096 (W. 248)	The A465 Trunk Road (Aberdulais Interchange to Neath Interchange, Neath Port Talbot) (Temporary Traffic Prohibitions & Restrictions) Order 2020
1097	The Employment and Support Allowance and Universal Credit (Coronavirus Disease) (Amendment) Regulations 2020
1098 (W. 249)	The Health Protection (Coronavirus, International Travel) (Wales) (Amendment) (No. 14) Regulations 2020
1099	The Southampton to London Pipeline Development Consent Order 2020
1100 (W. 250)	The Health Protection (Coronavirus Restrictions) (Functions of Local Authorities etc.) (Wales) (Amendment) Regulations 2020

== 1101–1200 ==
Number	Title
1101	The Immigration (Persons Designated under Sanctions Regulations) (EU Exit) Regulations 2020
1102 (W. 251)	The Health Protection (Coronavirus Restrictions) (No. 2) (Wales) (Amendment) (No. 18) (Bangor) Regulations 2020
1103	Health Protection (Coronavirus, Local COVID-19 Alert Level) (Medium) (England) Regulations 2020
1104	Health Protection (Coronavirus, Local COVID-19 Alert Level) (High) (England) Regulations 2020
1105	Health Protection (Coronavirus, Local COVID-19 Alert Level) (Very High) (England) Regulations 2020
1106	The London Borough of Barnet (Electoral Changes) Order 2020
1107	The London Borough of Camden (Electoral Changes) Order 2020
1108	The London Borough of Hounslow (Electoral Changes) Order 2020
1109	The London Borough of Enfield (Electoral Changes) Order 2020
1110	The London Borough of Haringey (Electoral Changes) Order 2020
1111	The Carriage of Dangerous Goods and Use of Transportable Pressure Equipment (Amendment) (EU Exit) Regulations 2020
1112	The Product Safety and Metrology etc. (Amendment) (Northern Ireland) (EU Exit) Regulations 2020
1113	The Value Added Tax (Refund of Tax to the Charter Trustees for Bournemouth and the Charter Trustees for Poole) Order 2020
1114	The European Structural and Investment Funds Common Provisions and Common Provision Rules etc. (Amendment) (EU Exit) (Revocation) Regulations 2020
1115	The Transfrontier Shipment of Radioactive Waste and Spent Fuel (Amendment) (EU Exit) Regulations 2020
1116	The Aviation Safety (Amendment) (EU Exit) Regulations 2020
1117 (W. 252)	The A494 Trunk Road (Gwyddelwern, Denbighshire) (Temporary 40 mph Speed Limit) Order 2020
1118 (W. 253)	The Health Protection (Coronavirus, Public Health Information for Persons Travelling to Wales etc.) (Amendment) Regulations 2020
1119 (W. 254)	The A470 Trunk Road (Northbound Lane at Black Cat Roundabout, Conwy) (Temporary Traffic Prohibitions) Order 2020
1120	The Apprenticeships (Alternative English Completion Conditions and Miscellaneous Provisions) (Amendment) (Coronavirus) Regulations 2020
1121 (W. 255)	The School Teachers’ Pay and Conditions (Wales) Order 2020
1122	The Restriction of Public Sector Exit Payments Regulations 2020
1123	The General Synod of the Church of England (Postponement of Elections) (Amendment) Order 2020
1124	The Lebanon (Sanctions) (Overseas Territories) Order 2020
1125	Human Medicines (Coronavirus and Influenza) (Amendment) Regulations 2020
1126	The National Health Service (Charges and Pharmaceutical and Local Pharmaceutical Services) (Amendment) Regulations 2020
1127 (W. 256)	The A55 Trunk Road (Junction 32a (Halkyn Springfield) to Junction 31 (Caerwys), Flintshire) (Temporary Prohibition of Vehicles, Cyclists & Pedestrians) Order 2020
1128	The Health Protection (Coronavirus, Local COVID-19 Alert Level) (High) (England) (Amendment) Regulations 2020
1129	The Health Protection (Coronavirus, International Travel) (England) (Amendment) (No. 19) Regulations 2020
1130 (W. 257)	The Health Protection (Coronavirus Restrictions) (No. 2) (Wales) (Amendment) (No. 19) Regulations 2020
1131	The Health Protection (Coronavirus, Local COVID-19 Alert Level) (Very High) (England) (Amendment) Regulations 2020
1132	The Air Quality (Amendment) (Northern Ireland Protocol) (EU Exit) Regulations 2020
1133 (W. 258)	The Health Protection (Coronavirus, International Travel) (Wales) (Amendment) (No. 15) Regulations 2020
1134 (W. 259)	The Official Controls (Plant Health and Genetically Modified Organisms) (Wales) (Amendment) Regulations 2020
1135	M25 Motorway (Junction 5) (50 Miles Per Hour Speed Limit) Regulations 2020
1136	M1 Motorway (Junction 2) (50 Miles Per Hour Speed Limit) Regulations 2020
1137	Wear Valley Railway (Transfer) Order 2020
1138	The Universal Credit (Earned Income) Amendment Regulations 2020
1139	The Alternative Dispute Resolution for Consumer Disputes (Extension of Time Limits for Legal Proceedings) (Amendment etc.) (EU Exit) Regulations 2020
1140	The Air Navigation (Restriction of Flying) (Remembrance Sunday) Regulations 2020
1141	The British Nationality (General) (Amendment) Regulations 2020
1142	The Air Quality (Amendment) (Northern Ireland Protocol) (EU Exit) (Revocation) Regulations 2020
1143	The Marriage and Civil Partnership (Northern Ireland) (No. 2) Regulations 2020
1144	Not Allocated
1145 (W. 260)	The A55 Trunk Road (Junction 11 (Llys y Gwynt Interchange), Bangor, Gwynedd to the Wales/England Border) and the A494/A550 Trunk Road (Ewloe Interchange to the Wales/England Border, Flintshire) (Temporary Traffic Prohibitions and Restrictions) Order 2020
1146	The Heavy Commercial Vehicles in Kent (No. 3) (Amendment) Order 2020
1147	The Immigration and Nationality (Replacement of Tier 2 and Fees) (Amendment) (EU Exit) Regulations 2020
1148	The West Burton C (Gas Fired Generating Station) Order 2020
1149 (W. 261)	The Health Protection (Coronavirus Restrictions) (No. 3) (Wales) Regulations 2020
1150	The Income Tax (Pay As You Earn) (Amendment No. 3) Regulations 2020
1151	The Pollution Prevention and Control (Designation of Directives) (Offshore) Order 2020
1152	The National Health Service (Charges to Overseas Visitors) (Amendment) (No.3) Regulations 2020
1153 (W. 262)	The A5, A44, A55, A458, A470, A479, A483, A487, A489 and A494 Trunk Roads (Various Locations in North and Mid Wales) (Temporary Prohibition of Vehicles) Order 2020
1154	The Health Protection (Coronavirus, Local COVID-19 Alert Level) (Medium, High and Very High) (England) (Amendment) Regulations 2020
1155	The Heavy Commercial Vehicles in Kent (No. 2) (Amendment) Order 2020
1156	The Social Security (Coronavirus) (Prisoners) Amendment Regulations 2020
1157	The Worcestershire Health and Care National Health Service Trust (Establishment) and the Worcestershire Mental Health Partnership National Health Service Trust (Dissolution) (Amendment) Order 2020
1158	The Lake Lothing (Lowestoft) Third Crossing (Correction) Order 2020
1159 (C. 32)	The Youth Justice and Criminal Evidence Act 1999 (Commencement No. 19) Order 2020
1160	Human Rights Act 1998 (Remedial) Order 2020
1161	The Health Protection (Coronavirus, International Travel) (England) (Amendment) (No. 20) Regulations 2020
1162	Not Allocated
1163	The West Midlands Rail Freight Interchange (Correction) Order 2020
1164	The M42 Junction 6 Development Consent (Correction) Order 2020
1165 (W. 263)	The Health Protection (Coronavirus, International Travel) (Wales) (Amendment) (No. 16) Regulations 2020
1166	The Merchant Shipping (Maritime Labour Convention and Work in Fishing Convention) (Amendment) Regulations 2020
1167	The Value Added Tax (Refund of Tax to Museums and Galleries) (Amendment) Order 2020
1168	Not Allocated
1169	The Air Navigation (Restriction of Flying) (East of Ventnor) (Emergency) Regulations 2020
1170	Not Allocated
1171	The Air Navigation (Restriction of Flying) (East of Ventnor) (No. 2) (Emergency) Regulations 2020
1172	Not Allocated
1173	The Air Navigation (Restriction of Flying) (East of Ventnor) (Emergency) (Revocation) Regulations 2020
1174	The Air Navigation (Restriction of Flying) (East of Ventnor) (No. 2) (Emergency) (Revocation) Regulations 2020
1175	The Health Protection (Notification) (Amendment) (Coronavirus) Regulations 2020
1176	The Health Protection (Coronavirus, Local COVID-19 Alert Level) (Medium, High and Very High) (England) (Amendment) (No. 2) Regulations 2020
1177 (W. 264)	The A44 Trunk Road (Quebec Road, Llanbadarn Fawr, Ceredigion) (Prohibition of Waiting) Order 2020
1178	The Road Vehicles (Construction and Use) (Amendment) Regulations 2020
1179 (W. 265)	The Waste (Wales) (Miscellaneous Amendments) Regulations 2020
1180 (W. 266)	The A465 Trunk Road (Dowlais Top Roundabout, Merthyr Tydfil to Aberdulais Interchange, Neath Port Talbot) (Temporary Prohibition of Vehicles, Cyclists & Pedestrians) Order 2020
1181	The Education (Student Fees, Awards and Support) (Amendment etc.) (EU Exit) Regulations 2020
1182 (W. 267)	The Additional Learning Needs and Education Tribunal (Wales) Act 2018 (Commencement No. 1) Order 2020
1183	The Health Protection (Coronavirus, Local COVID-19 Alert Level) (Medium, High and Very High) (England) (Amendment) (No. 3) Regulations 2020
1184	The A63 Castle Street Improvement Hull (Correction) Order 2020
1185	The Offshore Installations (Safety Zones) (No. 2) Order 2020
1186 (W. 268)	The A4042 Trunk Road (Edlogan Way Roundabout, Croesyceiliog to Court Farm Roundabout, Pontypool, Torfaen) (Temporary 50 mph Speed Limit) Order 2020
1187	The Harwich Haven and Walton Backwaters (Application of the Pilotage Act 1987) Order 2020
1188	The Bank Levy (Loss Absorbing Instruments) Regulations 2020
1189	The Health Protection (Coronavirus, Local COVID-19 Alert Level) (High) (England) (Amendment) (No. 2) Regulations 2020
1190	The Health Protection (Coronavirus, International Travel) (England) (Amendment) (No. 21) Regulations 2020
1191 (W. 269)	The Health Protection (Coronavirus, International Travel) (Wales) (Amendment) (No. 17) Regulations 2020
1192	The Health Protection (Coronavirus, Local COVID-19 Alert Level) (High) (England) (Amendment) (No. 3) Regulations 2020
1193 (W. 270)	The A40 Trunk Road (Llandovery Level Crossing, Llandovery, Carmarthenshire) (Temporary Prohibition of Vehicles) Order 2020
1194 (W. 271)	The Welsh in Education Strategic Plans (Wales) (Amendment) (Coronavirus) Regulations 2020
1195	The Energy Information (Amendment) Regulations 2020
1196	The Air Navigation (Restriction of Flying) (Helicopter Flight) Regulations 2020
1197	Not Allocated
1198	The Coronavirus Life Assurance Scheme (Northern Irish Scheme) (Excluded Benefits for Tax Purposes) Regulations 2020
1199	The Wireless Telegraphy (Licence Award) Regulations 2020
1200	Health Protection (Coronavirus, Restrictions) (England) (No. 4) Regulations 2020

== 1201-1300 ==
Number	Title
1201	The Social Security (Coronavirus) (Further Measures) (Amendment) and Miscellaneous Amendment Regulations 2020
1202	The Local Authorities (Collection Fund: Surplus and Deficit) (Coronavirus) (England) Regulations 2020
1203	The Education (Student Fees, Awards and Support etc.) (Amendment) (No. 3) Regulations 2020
1204	Not Allocated
1205	Not Allocated
1206	The Greater London Authority (Consolidated Council Tax Requirement Procedure) Regulations 2020
1207 (W. 272)	The National Health Service (Performers Lists) (Wales) (Amendment) Regulations 2020
1208	The Immigration Skills Charge (Amendment) Regulations 2020
1209	The Citizens' Rights (Application Deadline and Temporary Protection) (EU Exit) Regulations 2020
1210	The Citizens' Rights (Restrictions of Rights of Entry and Residence) (EU Exit) Regulations 2020
1211 (W. 273)	The Smoke-free Premises and Vehicles (Wales) Regulations 2020
1212	The Local Authorities (Capital Finance and Accounting) (England) (Amendment) Regulations 2020
1213	The Citizens' Rights (Frontier Workers) (EU Exit) Regulations 2020
1214	The Immigration (Isle of Man) (Amendment) Order 2020
1215 (W. 274)	The Environment (Miscellaneous Amendments) (Wales) (EU Exit) Regulations 2020
1216 (W. 275) (C. 34)	The Planning (Wales) Act 2015 (Commencement No. 6) Order 2020
1217	The Electricity Storage Facilities (Exemption) (England and Wales) Order 2020
1218	The Infrastructure Planning (Electricity Storage Facilities) Order 2020
1219 (W. 276)	The Health Protection (Coronavirus Restrictions) (No. 4) (Wales) Regulations 2020
1220	The Social Security Contributions (Intermediaries) (Miscellaneous Amendments) Regulations 2020
1221	The Heat Network (Metering and Billing) (Amendment) Regulations 2020
1222	The Merchant Shipping (Safety Standards for Passenger Ships on Domestic Voyages) (Miscellaneous Amendments) Regulations 2020
1223 (W. 277)	The Health Protection (Coronavirus, International Travel) (Wales) (Amendment) (No. 18) Regulations 2020
1224	The City of Westminster (Electoral Changes) Order 2020
1225	The London Borough of Sutton (Electoral Changes) Order 2020
1226	The Community Infrastructure Levy (Amendment) (England) (No. 2) Regulations 2020
1227	The Health Protection (Coronavirus, International Travel) (England) (Amendment) (No. 22) Regulations 2020
1228 (L. 21)	The Civil Procedure (Amendment No. 6) Rules 2020
1229	The London Borough of Hammersmith & Fulham (Electoral Changes) Order 2020
1230	The London Borough of Richmond upon Thames (Electoral Changes) Order 2020
1231	The London Borough of Lewisham (Electoral Changes) Order 2020
1232 (W. 278)	The Health Protection (Coronavirus, International Travel) (Wales) (Amendment) (No. 19) Regulations 2020
1233	The Syria (United Nations Sanctions) (Cultural Property) (EU Exit) Regulations 2020
1234	The Customs (Declarations) (Amendment and Modification) (EU Exit) Regulations 2020
1235	The Social Security (Personal Independence Payment) (Amendment) Regulations 2020
1236 (C. 35)	Sentencing Act 2020 (Commencement No. 1) Regulations 2020
1237 (W. 279)	The Health Protection (Coronavirus, International Travel and Restrictions) (Amendment) (Wales) Regulations 2020
1238	The Health Protection (Coronavirus, International Travel) (England) (Amendment) (No. 23) Regulations 2020
1239	The Health Protection (Coronavirus, Travel from Denmark) (England) Regulations 2020 (revoked)
1240 (W. 280)	The Equine Identification (Wales) (Amendment) (EU Exit) Regulations 2020
1241	The Wireless Telegraphy (Limitation of Number of Licences) Order 2020
1242	The Health Protection (Coronavirus, Restrictions) (England) (No. 4) (Amendment) Regulations 2020
1243	The Town and Country Planning (General Permitted Development) (England) (Amendment) Regulations 2020
1244	The Central Counterparties (Equivalence) Regulations 2020
1245	The Network and Information Systems (Amendment and Transitional Provision etc.) Regulations 2020
1246 (W. 281)	The Teachers' Qualifications (Amendment) (Wales) (EU Exit) Regulations 2020
1247	The Statutory Auditors and Third Country Auditors (Amendment) (EU Exit) (No. 2) Regulations 2020
1248	The Consumer Credit (Enforcement, Default and Termination Notices) (Coronavirus) (Amendment) Regulations 2020
1249 (W. 282)	The Fisheries and Marine Management (Amendment) (Wales) (EU Exit) Regulations 2020
1250 (W. 283)	The Non-Domestic Rating (Demand Notices) (Wales) (Amendment) (EU Exit) Regulations 2020
1251	Antarctic Act 1994 (Convention for the Conservation of Antarctic Marine Living Resources) Regulations 2020
1252 (W. 284)	The Nutrition (Miscellaneous Amendments) (Wales) (EU Exit) Regulations 2020
1253	The Inspectors of Education, Children's Services and Skills (No. 5) Order 2020
1254 (W. 285)	The Non-Domestic Rating (Multiplier) (Wales) Order 2020
1255	The Senedd Cymru (Disqualification) Order 2020
1256	The Tobacco Products Duty (Alteration of Rates) Order 2020
1257	The Anguilla Constitution (Amendment) Order 2020
1258	The Education (Exemption from School and Further Education Institutions Inspections) (England) (Amendment) Regulations 2020
1259	The Network Rail (London to Corby) (Land Acquisition) Order 2020
1260	The Iraq (Sanctions) (Overseas Territories) Order 2020
1261	The Dockyard Port of Plymouth Order 2020
1262	The Venezuela (Sanctions) (Overseas Territories) Order 2020
1263	The Burundi (Sanctions) (Overseas Territories) Order 2020
1264	The Burma (Sanctions) (Overseas Territories) Order 2020
1265	The Greenhouse Gas Emissions Trading Scheme Order 2020
1266	The Guinea (Sanctions) (Overseas Territories) Order 2020
1267	The Chemical Weapons (Sanctions) (Overseas Territories) Order 2020
1268	The Bosnia and Herzegovina (Sanctions) (Overseas Territories) Order 2020
1269	The Nicaragua (Sanctions) (Overseas Territories) (No. 2) Order 2020
1270	The Cyber (Sanctions) (Overseas Territories) (No. 2) Order 2020
1271	The Republic of Belarus (Sanctions) (Overseas Territories) Order 2020
1272	The Zimbabwe (Sanctions) (Overseas Territories) Order 2020
1273	The Adjacent Waters Boundaries (Northern Ireland) (Amendment) Order 2020
1274	The Financial Services (Gibraltar) (Amendment) (EU Exit) Regulations 2020
1275	The Payment Services and Electronic Money (Amendment) Regulations 2020
1276	The Road Vehicles (Display of Registration Marks) (Amendment) Regulations 2020
1277	The Health Protection (Coronavirus, International Travel, Travel from Denmark) (England) (Amendment) Regulations 2020
1278	The Yemen (Sanctions) (EU Exit) (No. 2) Regulations 2020
1279 (C. 36)	The Immigration and Social Security Co-ordination (EU Withdrawal) Act 2020 (Commencement) Regulations 2020
1280	The Air Navigation (Isle of Man) (Amendment) Order 2020
1281	The Democratic Republic of the Congo (Sanctions) (Overseas Territories) Order 2020
1282	The Lebanon (Sanctions) (Assassination of Rafiq Hariri and others) (Overseas Territories) Order 2020
1283	The Cayman Islands Constitution (Amendment) Order 2020
1284	The Afghanistan (Sanctions) (Overseas Territories) Order 2020
1285	The Somalia (Sanctions) (Overseas Territories) Order 2020
1286	The Central African Republic (Sanctions) (Overseas Territories) Order 2020
1287	The South Sudan (Sanctions) (Overseas Territories) Order 2020
1288 (W. 286)	The Health Protection (Coronavirus, International Travel and Restrictions) (Amendment) (No. 2) (Wales) Regulations 2020
1289	The Sanctions (EU Exit) (Consequential Provisions) (Amendment) Regulations 2020
1290	The Public Health (Coronavirus) (Protection from Eviction and Taking Control of Goods) (England) Regulations 2020
1291	The Air Navigation (Restriction of Flying) (Inverness) (Emergency) Regulations 2020
1292	The Health Protection (Coronavirus, International Travel) (England) (Amendment) (No. 24) Regulations 2020
1293	The Income Tax (Exemption of Minor Benefits) (Coronavirus) Regulations 2020
1294	The Seeds (Amendment etc.) (EU Exit) Regulations 2020
1295	The Air Navigation (Restriction of Flying) (Inverness) (Emergency) (Revocation) Regulations 2020
1296	Employment Rights Act 1996 (Coronavirus, Calculation of a Week's Pay) (Amendment) Regulations 2020
1297	The A303 (Amesbury to Berwick Down) Development Consent Order 2020
1298	The Armed Forces Redundancy Scheme Order 2020
1299	The Electricity (Risk-Preparedness) (Amendment etc.) (EU Exit) Regulations 2020
1300	The International Tax Compliance (Amendment) (No. 2) (EU Exit) Regulations 2020

== 1301-1400 ==
Number	Title
1301	The Financial Services and Economic and Monetary Policy (Consequential Amendments) (EU Exit) Regulations 2020
1302 (W. 287)	The Education (Student Finance) (Miscellaneous Amendments) (Wales) (EU Exit) Regulations 2020
1303 (W. 288)	The Official Controls (Plant Health and Genetically Modified Organisms) (Wales) (Amendment) (No. 2) Regulations 2020
1304	The Blood Safety and Quality (Amendment) (EU Exit) Regulations 2020
1305	The Quality and Safety of Organs Intended for Transplantation (Amendment) (EU Exit) Regulations 2020
1306	The Human Tissue (Quality and Safety for Human Application) (Amendment) (EU Exit) Regulations 2020
1307	The Human Fertilisation and Embryology (Amendment) (EU Exit) Regulations 2020
1308 (W. 289)	The Food and Rural Affairs (Miscellaneous Amendments) (Wales) (EU Exit) Regulations 2020
1309	The Immigration and Social Security Co-ordination (EU Withdrawal) Act 2020 (Consequential, Saving, Transitional and Transitory Provisions) (EU Exit) Regulations 2020
1310	The Flags (Northern Ireland) (Amendment) (No. 2) Regulations 2020
1311	The Debt Respite Scheme (Breathing Space Moratorium and Mental Health Crisis Moratorium) (England and Wales) Regulations 2020
1312	The Value Added Tax (Miscellaneous Amendments to Acts of Parliament) (EU Exit) Regulations 2020
1313	The Environment (Miscellaneous Amendments) (EU Exit) Regulations 2020
1314	The Domestic Violence, Crime and Victims Act 2004 (Victims’ Code of Practice) Order 2020
1315	The Timber and Timber Products and FLEGT (Amendment) (EU Exit) Regulations 2020
1316	The Tobacco Products and Nicotine Inhaling Products (Amendment) (EU Exit) Regulations 2020
1317	The Patents, Trade Marks and Designs (Address for Service) (Amendment) (EU Exit) Rules 2020
1318 (W. 290)	The Town and Country Planning (General Permitted Development) (Amendment) (No. 3) (Wales) Order 2020
1319	The Public Procurement (Amendment etc.) (EU Exit) Regulations 2020
1320 (W. 291)	The Representation of the People (Election Expenses Exclusion) (Wales) (Amendment) Order 2020
1321	The Surrender of Offensive Weapons (Compensation) Regulations 2020
1322	The Immigration (Isle of Man) (Amendment) (No. 2) Order 2020
1323	The Health Protection (Coronavirus, International Travel) (England) (Amendment) (No. 25) Regulations 2020
1324 (W. 292)	The Environmental Assessments and Town and Country Planning (Miscellaneous Amendments) (Wales) (EU Exit) Regulations 2020
1325	The General Optical Council (Committee Constitution, Registration and Fitness to Practise) (Coronavirus) (Amendment) Rules Order of Council 2020
1326	The Health Protection (Coronavirus, Restrictions) (England) (No. 4) (Amendment) (No. 2) Regulations 2020
1327 (W. 293)	The Government of Maintained Schools (Wales) (Amendment) Regulations 2020
1328 (W. 294)	The Federation of Maintained Schools (Wales) (Amendment) Regulations 2020
1329 (W. 295)	The Health Protection (Coronavirus, International Travel) (Wales) (Amendment) (No. 20) Regulations 2020
1330	Criminal Procedure and Investigations Act 1996 (Code of Practice) Order 2020
1331 (C. 37)	The Youth Justice and Criminal Evidence Act 1999 (Commencement No. 20) Order 2020
1332	The Occupational Pensions (Revaluation) Order 2020
1333 (C. 38)	The Value Added Tax (Disclosure of Information Relating to VAT Registration) (Appointed Day) (EU Exit) Regulations 2020
1334	Not Allocated
1335	The National Health Service (Dental Charges) (Amendment) Regulations 2020
1336	The Producer Responsibility Obligations (Packaging Waste) (Amendment) (England) Regulations 2020
1337	Health Protection (Coronavirus, International Travel) (England) (Amendment) (No. 26) Regulations 2020
1338	The Reciprocal Enforcement of Foreign Judgments (Norway) (Amendment) (England and Wales and Northern Ireland) Order 2020
1339 (W. 296)	The Waste (Wales) (Miscellaneous Amendments) (EU Exit) Regulations 2020
1340 (W. 297)	The Welshpool Church in Wales Primary School (Change to School Session Times) Order 2020
1341	The Higher Education (Fee Limits and Student Support) (England) (Coronavirus) (Revocation) Regulations 2020
1342	The Services of Lawyers and Lawyer's Practice (Revocation etc.) (EU Exit) Regulations 2020
1343	The Competition (Amendment etc.) (EU Exit) Regulations 2020
1344 (W. 298)	The A494 Trunk Road (Rhydymain, Gwynedd) (Part-time 40 mph Speed Limit) Order 2020
1345	Not Allocated
1346	The Bearer Certificates (Collective Investment Schemes) Regulations 2020
1347	The Consumer Protection (Enforcement) (Amendment etc.) (EU Exit) Regulations 2020
1348	The Reciprocal and Cross-Border Healthcare (Amendment etc.) (EU Exit) Regulations 2020
1349	The Corporate Insolvency and Governance Act 2020 (Coronavirus) (Suspension of Liability for Wrongful Trading and Extension of the Relevant Period) Regulations 2020
1350	The Bank Recovery and Resolution (Amendment) (EU Exit) Regulations 2020
1351 (W. 299)	The Additional Learning Needs Co-ordinator (Wales) Regulations 2020
1352	The Air Quality (Amendment) (Northern Ireland Protocol) (EU Exit) (No. 2) Regulations 2020
1353	The Immigration (Leave to Enter and Remain) (Amendment) (EU Exit) Order 2020
1354	The Prevention of Trade Diversion (Key Medicines) (EU Exit) Regulations 2020
1355	The Parish and Community Meetings (Coronavirus) (Polls) (Amendment) (England) Rules 2020
1356 (W. 300)	The Legislation (Wales) Act 2019 (Amendment of Schedule 1) Regulations 2020
1357	The Non-Domestic Rating (Rates Retention, Levy and Safety Net and Levy Account: Basis of Distribution) (Amendment) Regulations 2020
1358	The Persistent Organic Pollutants (Amendment) (EU Exit) Regulations 2020
1359	The Construction Products (Amendment etc.) (EU Exit) Regulations 2020
1360	The Health Protection (Coronavirus, International Travel) (England) (Amendment) (No. 27) Regulations 2020
1361	The Road Vehicles (Registration and Licensing) (Amendment) (EU Exit) Regulations 2020
1362 (W. 301)	The Health Protection (Coronavirus, International Travel) (Wales) (Amendment) (No. 21) Regulations 2020
1363	The Road Vehicles (Display of Registration Marks) (Amendment) (EU Exit) (No. 2) Regulations 2020
1364	The Police Act 1997 (Criminal Record Certificates: Relevant Matters) (Amendment) (England and Wales) Order 2020
1365	The Power to Award Degrees etc. (Dyson Technical Training Limited) Order 2020
1366 (W. 302)	The Non-Domestic Rating Contributions (Wales) (Amendment) Regulations 2020
1367 (W. 303)	The Additional Learning Needs (List of Independent Special Post-16 Institutions) (Wales) Regulations 2020
1368	Not Allocated
1369	The Greenhouse Gas Emissions Trading Scheme (Withdrawal Agreement) (EU Exit) Regulations 2020
1370	The Public Lending Right Scheme 1982 (Commencement of Variation) (No. 2) Order 2020
1371	The Law Enforcement and Security (Amendment) (EU Exit) Regulations 2020
1372	The Immigration (Citizens’ Rights etc.) (EU Exit) Regulations 2020
1373	The Rehabilitation of Offenders Act 1974 (Exceptions) Order 1975 (Amendment) (England and Wales) Order 2020
1374	Health Protection (Coronavirus, Restrictions) (All Tiers) (England) Regulations 2020
1375	Health Protection (Coronavirus, Restrictions) (Local Authority Enforcement Powers and Amendment) (England) Regulations 2020
1376	The Pesticides (Amendment) (EU Exit) Regulations 2020
1377 (W. 304)	The A487 and A40 Trunk Roads (Fishguard, Pembrokeshire) (Prohibition of Waiting, Loading and Unloading) Order 2020
1378 (W. 305)	The Rating Lists (Valuation Date) (Wales) Order 2020
1379	The Customs Safety, Security and Economic Operators Registration and Identification (Amendment etc.) (EU Exit) Regulations 2020
1380 (W. 306)	The A487 and A40 Trunk Roads (Fishguard, Pembrokeshire) (One Way Traffic) Order 2020
1381 (W. 307)	The Animal Feed (Particular Nutritional Purposes and Miscellaneous Amendments) (Wales) Regulations 2020
1382	The London Borough of Merton (Electoral Changes) Order 2020
1383	The Double Taxation Dispute Resolution (EU) (Revocation) (EU Exit) Regulations 2020
1384	The Value Added Tax (Amendment) Regulations 2020
1385	The Securities Financing Transactions, Securitisation and Miscellaneous Amendments (EU Exit) Regulations 2020
1386	The Heavy Commercial Vehicles in Kent (No. 1) (Amendment) Order 2020
1387	The Direct Payments to Farmers and Cross-Compliance (Simplifications) (England) (Amendment) Regulations 2020
1388	The Animals, Aquatic Animal Health, Invasive Alien Species, Plant Propagating Material and Seeds (Amendment) (EU Exit) Regulations 2020
1389	The Dogger Bank Teesside A and B Offshore Wind Farm (Amendment) (No. 2) Order 2020
1390 (W. 308)	The Producer Responsibility Obligations (Packaging Waste) (Amendment) (Wales) Regulations 2020
1391	The State Pension Debits and Credits (Revaluation) (No. 2) Order 2020
1392	The State Pension Revaluation for Transitional Pensions (No. 2) Order 2020
1393	The Road Vehicles and Non-Road Mobile Machinery (Type-Approval) (Amendment) (EU Exit) Regulations 2020
1394	The European Qualifications (Health and Social Care Professions) (EFTA States) (Amendment etc.) (EU Exit) Regulations 2020
1395	The Environment and Wildlife (Miscellaneous Amendments etc.) (EU Exit) Regulations 2020
1396 (W. 309)	The National Health Service (General Medical Services Contracts) (Prescription of Drugs etc.) (Wales) (Amendment) (EU Exit) Regulations 2020
1397	The Sanctions (EU Exit) (Miscellaneous Amendments) (No. 5) Regulations 2020
1398	The Town and Country Planning (Local Planning, Development Management Procedure, Listed Buildings etc.) (England) (Coronavirus) (Amendment) Regulations 2020
1399 (W. 310)	The Local Government (Coronavirus) (Postponement of Elections) (Wales) (No. 2) Regulations 2020
1400	The Organic Products (Production and Control) (Amendment) (EU Exit) Regulations 2020

== 1401-1500 ==
Number	Title
1401	The Electricity and Gas (Internal Markets) (No. 2) Regulations 2020
1402	The New Heavy Duty Vehicles (Carbon Dioxide Emission Performance Standards) (Amendment) (EU Exit) Regulations 2020
1403	The Non-Domestic Rating (Compilation and Alteration of Lists) (England) Regulations 2020
1404	The Air Navigation (Restriction of Flying) (Ettrick Bay) (Emergency) Regulations 2020
1405	The Common Rules for Exports (EU Exit) Regulations 2020
1406	The Financial Holding Companies (Approval etc.) and Capital Requirements (Capital Buffers and Macro-prudential Measures) (Amendment) (EU Exit) Regulations 2020
1407	Not Allocated
1408	The Law Enforcement and Security (Separation Issues etc.) (EU Exit) Regulations 2020
1409 (W. 311)	The Health Protection (Coronavirus Restrictions and Functions of Local Authorities) (Amendment) (Wales) Regulations 2020
1410	The Food and Feed Hygiene and Safety (Miscellaneous Amendments) (England) Regulations 2020
1411	The Vaccine Damage Payments (Specified Disease) Order 2020
1412	The Travellers' Allowances and Miscellaneous Provisions (EU Exit) Regulations 2020
1413	The Value Added Tax (Reduced Rate) (Hospitality and Tourism) (Extension of Time Period) (Coronavirus) Order 2020
1414	The Air Navigation (Restriction of Flying) (Ettrick Bay) (Emergency) (Revocation) Regulations 2020
1415	The National Health Service (General Medical Services Contracts and Personal Medical Services Agreements) (Amendment) (No. 3) Regulations 2020
1416 (C. 39)	The Counter-Terrorism (Sanctions) (EU Exit) (Commencement) Regulations 2020
1417	The Channel Tunnel (Customs and Excise) (Amendment) (EU Exit) Order 2020
1418	The Road Vehicle Carbon Dioxide Emission Performance Standards (Cars and Vans) (Amendment) (EU Exit) Regulations 2020
1419	The Electronic Communications and Wireless Telegraphy (Amendment) (European Electronic Communications Code and EU Exit) Regulations 2020
1420	The Communications Act (e-Commerce) (EU Exit) Regulations 2020
1421	The Genetically Modified Organisms (Amendment) (EU Exit) Regulations 2020
1422	The Energy Performance of Buildings (England and Wales) (Amendment) Regulations 2020
1423	The National Health Service (Charges to Overseas Visitors) (Amendment) (EU Exit) Regulations 2020
1424	The Health Protection (Coronavirus, International Travel) (England) (Amendment) (No. 28) Regulations 2020
1425	Not Allocated
1426	Not Allocated
1427	The International Development Association (Nineteenth Replenishment) Order 2020
1428	The African Development Fund (Multilateral Debt Relief Initiative) (Amendment) Order 2020
1429	The Ship Recycling (Facilities and Requirements for Hazardous Materials on Ships) (Amendment) (EU Exit) Regulations 2020
1430	The Customs Tariff (Establishment) (EU Exit) Regulations 2020
1431	The Customs (Reliefs from a Liability to Import Duty and Miscellaneous Amendments) (EU Exit) Regulations 2020
1432	The Customs (Tariff Quotas) (EU Exit) Regulations 2020
1433	The Customs (Origin of Chargeable Goods) (EU Exit) Regulations 2020
1434	The Customs (Tariff-free Access for Goods from British Overseas Territories) (EU Exit) Regulations 2020
1435	The Customs Tariff (Suspension of Import Duty Rates) (EU Exit) Regulations 2020
1436	The Customs (Origin of Chargeable Goods: Trade Preference Scheme) (EU Exit) Regulations 2020
1437	The Customs (Import Duty Variation) (EU Exit) Regulations 2020
1438	The Trade Preference Scheme (EU Exit) Regulations 2020
1439	The Taxation Cross-border Trade (Special Procedures Supplementary and General Provision etc.) (EU Exit) Regulations 2020
1440	The International Development Association (Multilateral Debt Relief Initiative) (Amendment) Order 2020
1441	The African Development Bank (Further Payments to Capital Stock) Order 2020
1442	The International Finance Corporation (General Capital Increase) Order 2020
1443	The African Development Bank (Fifteenth Replenishment of the African Development Fund) Order 2020
1444	The Clean Air Zones Central Services (Fees) (England) Regulations 2020
1445	The Agriculture (Payments) (Amendment, etc.) (EU Exit) Regulations 2020
1446	The Common Organisation of the Markets in Agricultural Products (Producer Organisations and Wine) (Amendment etc.) (EU Exit) Regulations 2020
1447	The European Union Withdrawal (Consequential Modifications) (EU Exit) Regulations 2020
1448 (W. 312)	The Environmental Impact Assessment (Agriculture) (Wales) (Amendment) Regulations 2020
1449	The Customs (Transitional) (EU Exit) Regulations 2020
1450	The Defence and Security Public Contracts (Amendment) (EU Exit) Regulations 2020
1451 (W. 313)	The Digital Health and Care Wales (Establishment and Membership) Order 2020
1452	The Common Organisation of the Markets in Agricultural Products (Miscellaneous Amendments) (EU Exit) Regulations 2020
1453	The Common Organisation of the Markets in Agricultural Products (Miscellaneous Amendments) (EU Exit) (No. 2) Regulations 2020
1454	The Definition of Qualifying Northern Ireland Goods (EU Exit) Regulations 2020
1455	The International Waste Shipments (Amendment of Regulation (EC) No 1013/2006) Regulations 2020
1456 (W. 314)	The Business Tenancies (Extension of Protection from Forfeiture etc.) (Wales) (Coronavirus) (No. 3) Regulations 2020
1457	The Customs Tariff (Preferential Trade Arrangements) (EU Exit) Regulations 2020
1458	The Return of Cultural Objects (Amendment) (EU Exit) Regulations 2020
1459	The Town and Country Planning (General Permitted Development) (England) (Amendment) (No. 4) Order 2020
1460	The Product Safety and Metrology etc. (Amendment etc.) (UK(NI) Indication) (EU Exit) Regulations 2020
1461	The Veterinary Medicines and Residues (Amendment) (EU Exit) Regulations 2020
1462	The Import of, and Trade in, Animals and Animal Products (Miscellaneous Amendments) (EU Exit) Regulations 2020
1463	The Aquatic Animal Health and Alien Species in Aquaculture, Animals, and Marketing of Seed, Plant and Propagating Material (Legislative Functions and Miscellaneous Provisions) (Amendment) (EU Exit) Regulations 2020
1464	The European Institutions and Consular Protection (Amendment etc.) (EU Exit) (Amendment) Regulations 2020
1465 (C. 40)	The Domestic Violence, Crime and Victims Act 2004 (Commencement No. 1) Order (Northern Ireland) 2020
1466	The Official Controls (Plant Health and Genetically Modified Organisms) (England) (Amendment) (No. 5) Regulations 2020
1467	The Coronavirus Act 2020 (Expiry of Mental Health Provisions) (England and Wales) Regulations 2020
1468	The Misappropriation (Sanctions) (EU Exit) Regulations 2020
1469 (W. 315)	The Digital Health and Care Wales (Membership and Procedure) Regulations 2020
1470	The State Aid (Revocations and Amendments) (EU Exit) Regulations 2020
1471	The Supplementary Protection Certificates (Amendment) (EU Exit) Regulations 2020
1472	The Business Tenancies (Protection from Forfeiture: Relevant Period) (Coronavirus) (England) (No. 3) Regulations 2020
1473	The Kimberley Process Certification Scheme (Amendment) (EU Exit) Regulations 2020
1474	The Unauthorised Drilling Activities in the Eastern Mediterranean (Sanctions) (EU Exit) Regulations 2020
1475	The National Lottery (Amendment) Regulations 2020
1476	The Nutrition (Amendment etc.) (EU Exit) Regulations 2020
1477 (W. 316)	The Health Protection (Coronavirus, International Travel and Restrictions) (Amendment) (No. 3) (Wales) Regulations 2020
1478	The Medical Devices (Amendment etc.) (EU Exit) Regulations 2020
1479	The Trade in Torture etc. Goods (Amendment) (EU Exit) Regulations 2020
1480 (C. 41)	The Offensive Weapons Act 2019 (Commencement No. 1) (England and Wales) Regulations 2020
1481	The Official Controls (Animals, Feed and Food, Plant Health etc.) (Amendment) (EU Exit) Regulations 2020
1482	The Plant Health (Amendment etc.) (EU Exit) Regulations 2020
1483	Corporate Insolvency and Governance Act 2020 (Coronavirus) (Extension of the Relevant Period) (No. 2) Regulations 2020
1484	The Personal Protective Equipment (Temporary Arrangements) (Coronavirus) (England) Regulations 2020
1485	The Network Rail (Cambridgeshire Level Crossing Reduction) Order 2020
1486	The Product Safety (Toys and Cosmetics) and Metrology (Measuring and Non-automatic Weighing Instruments) (Amendment) (EU Exit) Regulations 2020
1487 (W. 317)	The Official Feed and Food Controls (Miscellaneous Amendments) (Wales) Regulations 2020
1488	The Human Medicines (Amendment etc.) (EU Exit) Regulations 2020
1489 (W. 318)	The Personal Protective Equipment (Temporary Arrangements) (Coronavirus) (Wales) Regulations 2020
1490 (W. 319)	The Public Health (Protection from Eviction) (Wales) (Coronavirus) Regulations 2020
1491	The Customs Transit Procedures (Amendment, etc.) (EU Exit) Regulations 2020
1492 (W. 320)	The Plant Health (Forestry) (Miscellaneous Amendments) (Wales) (EU Exit) Regulations 2020
1493	The Civil, Criminal and Family Justice (Amendment) (EU Exit) Regulations 2020
1494	The Excise Duties (Transitional and Miscellaneous Amendments) (EU Exit) Regulations 2020
1495	The Value Added Tax (Miscellaneous and Transitional Provisions, Amendment and Revocation) (EU Exit) Regulations 2020
1496	The Tobacco Products (Traceability System and Security Features) (Amendments) (EU Exit) Regulations 2020
1497	The Offshore Oil and Gas Exploration, Production, Unloading and Storage (Environmental Impact Assessment) Regulations 2020
1498	The Air Traffic Management (Amendment etc.) (EU Exit) (No. 3) Regulations 2020
1499	The Taxes (State Aid) (Amendments) (EU Exit) Regulations 2020
1500	The Protocol on Ireland/Northern Ireland (Democratic Consent Process) (EU Exit) Regulations 2020

== 1501-1600 ==
Number	Title
1501	The Food (Amendment) (EU Exit) Regulations 2020
1502	The Export Control (Amendment) (EU Exit) Regulations 2020
1503	The Challenges to Validity of EU Instruments (Amendment) (EU Exit) Regulations 2020
1504	The Food and Feed Hygiene and Safety (Miscellaneous Amendments etc.) (EU Exit) Regulations 2020
1505	The Social Security, Child Benefit and Child Tax Credit (Amendment) (EU Exit) Regulations 2020
1506 (W. 321)	The M4 Motorway (Junction 45 (Ynysforgan) to Junction 46 (Llangyfelach), Swansea) (Temporary 50 mph Speed Limit) Order 2020
1507 (W. 322)	The A55 Trunk Road (Junction 10 (Caernarfon Road Interchange), Gwynedd to Junction 8 (Llanfairpwll Interchange), Anglesey) (Temporary Traffic Prohibitions & Restrictions) Order 2020
1508	The Social Security Co-ordination (Revocation of Retained Direct EU Legislation and Related Amendments) (EU Exit) Regulations 2020
1509	The Motor Vehicle Tyres (Labelling) (Enforcement) (Amendment) (EU Exit) Regulations 2020
1510	The Export Control (Amendment) (EU Exit) (No. 2) Regulations 2020
1511 (W. 323)	The Firefighters' Pension Schemes and Compensation Scheme (Wales) (Amendment) Regulations 2020
1512	The Designation of Rural Primary Schools (England) Order 2020
1513	The Direct Payments to Farmers (England) (Amendment) Regulations 2020
1514 (C. 42)	The Sanctions Regulations (EU Exit) (Commencement) Regulations 2020
1515	The Tax Credits, Childcare Payments and Childcare (Extended Entitlement) (Coronavirus and Miscellaneous Amendments) Regulations 2020
1516 (W. 324)	The Planning Applications (Temporary Modifications and Disapplication) (No. 3) (Wales) (Coronavirus) Order 2020
1517	The Health Protection (Coronavirus, International Travel and Public Health Information) (England) (Amendment) (No. 2) Regulations 2020
1518	The Health Protection (Coronavirus, Restrictions) (Self-Isolation and Linked Households) (England) Regulations 2020
1519	The Rent Officers (Housing Benefit and Universal Credit Functions) (Modification) Order 2020
1520	The Taking Account of Convictions (EU Exit) (Amendment) Regulations 2020
1521 (W. 325)	The Health Protection (Coronavirus, International Travel and Public Health Information to Travellers) (Wales) (Amendment) (No. 2) Regulations 2020
1522 (W. 326)	The Health Protection (Coronavirus Restrictions) (No. 4) (Wales) (Amendment) Regulations 2020
1523	The Social Security Contributions (Disregarded Payments) (Coronavirus) (No. 2) Regulations 2020
1524 (W. 327)	The Health Protection (Coronavirus Restrictions) (School Premises and Further Education Institution Premises) (Wales) Regulations 2020
1525	The European Union (Withdrawal) Act 2018 (Relevant Court) (Retained EU Case Law) Regulations 2020
1526	The Legislative Reform (Renewal of Radio Licences) Order 2020
1527	The Plant Health (Phytosanitary Conditions) (Amendment) (EU Exit) Regulations 2020
1528	The Ecodesign for Energy-Related Products and Energy Information (Amendment) (EU Exit) Regulations 2020
1529	The Business and Planning Act 2020 (London Spatial Development Strategy) (Coronavirus) (Amendment) Regulations 2020
1530	The Government Resources and Accounts Act 2000 (Estimates and Accounts) (Amendment) (No. 2) Order 2020
1531	The Environmental Assessment of Plans and Programmes (Amendment) Regulations 2020
1532	The Social Security Contributions (Disregarded Payments) (Coronavirus) (Scotland and Wales) Regulations 2020
1533	The Health Protection (Coronavirus, Restrictions) (All Tiers) (England) (Amendment) Regulations 2020
1534	The Infrastructure Planning (Publication and Notification of Applications etc.) (Amendment) Regulations 2020
1535 (C. 43)	The Sanctions and Anti-Money Laundering Act 2018 (Commencement No. 2) Regulations 2020
1536	The Audiovisual Media Services (Amendment) (EU Exit) Regulations 2020
1537 (C. 44)	The Prisoners (Disclosure of Information About Victims) Act 2020 (Commencement) Regulations 2020
1538	The National Ministry Register (Clergy) Regulations 2020
1539	The Ecclesiastical Judges, Legal Officers and Others (Fees) Order 2020
1540	The Waste and Environmental Permitting etc. (Legislative Functions and Amendment etc.) (EU Exit) Regulations 2020
1541	The Renewable Transport Fuel Obligations (Amendment) Order 2020
1542	The Common Fisheries Policy (Amendment etc.) (EU Exit) Regulations 2020
1543	The Ecclesiastical Offices (Terms of Service) (Amendment) Regulations 2020
1544	The Value Added Tax (Miscellaneous Amendments to the Value Added Tax Act 1994 and Revocation) (EU Exit) Regulations 2020
1545	The Value Added Tax (Miscellaneous Amendments, Northern Ireland Protocol and Savings and Transitional Provisions) (EU Exit) Regulations 2020
1546	The Value Added Tax (Northern Ireland) (EU Exit) Regulations 2020
1547	The Nuclear Safeguards Act 2018 (Commencement No. 2) Regulations 2020
1548	The Midland Metro (Wednesbury to Brierley Hill Land Acquisition) (Amendment) Order 2020
1549	Health Protection (Coronavirus, Testing Requirements and Standards) (England) Regulations 2020
1550	The Health and Social Care Act 2008 (Regulated Activities) (Amendment) (Coronavirus) (No. 2) Regulations 2020
1551	The Merchant Shipping (Home Office Ships) Order 2020
1552	The Customs (Amendment) (EU Exit) Regulations 2020
1553	The Education (Inspectors of Education and Training in Wales) Order 2020
1554	The Maritime Enforcement Powers (Specification of the Royal Navy Police) Regulations 2020
1555	The Air Navigation (Amendment) Order 2020
1556 (W. 328)	The Direct Payments to Farmers and Rural Affairs (Miscellaneous Amendments etc.) (Wales) (EU Exit) Regulations 2020
1557	The Greenhouse Gas Emissions Trading Scheme (Amendment) Order 2020
1558 (W. 329)	The Senedd Cymru (Representation of the People) (Amendment) Order 2020
1559	The Excise Duties (Northern Ireland Miscellaneous Modifications and Amendments) (EU Exit) Regulations 2020
1560	The Immigration (Guernsey) Order 2020
1561	The Democratic People's Republic of Korea (Sanctions) (Overseas Territories) Order 2020
1562	The Syria (United Nations Sanctions) (Cultural Property) (Overseas Territories) Order 2020
1563	The Iran (Sanctions) (Nuclear) (Overseas Territories) Order 2020
1564	The Counter-Terrorism (Sanctions) (Overseas Territories) Order 2020
1565	The Local Audit and Accountability Act 2014 (Commencement No. 7, Transitional Provisions and Savings) (Amendment) Order 2020
1566	The Immigration (EU Withdrawal) (Jersey) Order 2020
1567	The Chemicals (Health and Safety) and Genetically Modified Organisms (Contained Use) (Amendment etc.) (EU Exit) Regulations 2020
1568	The Competition Act 1998 (Groceries) (Public Policy Exclusion) Order 2020
1569	The Social Security (Iceland, Liechtenstein and Norway) (Citizens' Rights Agreement) (Revocation) Order 2020
1570	The Social Security (Switzerland) (Citizens’ Rights Agreement) (Revocation) Order 2020
1571	The Russia (Sanctions) (Overseas Territories) Order 2020
1572	The Health Protection (Coronavirus, Restrictions) (All Tiers) (England) (Amendment) (No. 2) Regulations 2020
1573 (W. 330)	The Marketing of Seeds and Plant Propagating Material (Amendment) (Wales) (EU Exit) Regulations 2020
1574	The Jurisdiction, Judgments and Applicable Law (Amendment) (EU Exit) Regulations 2020
1575	The Misappropriation (Sanctions) (Overseas Territories) Order 2020
1576	The Immigration (Isle of Man) (Amendment) (No. 3) Order 2020
1577	The REACH etc. (Amendment etc.) (EU Exit) Regulations 2020
1578	The World Trade Organisation Agreement on Agriculture (Domestic Support) Regulations 2020
1579	The Unauthorised Drilling Activities in the Eastern Mediterranean (Sanctions) (Overseas Territories) Order 2020
1580	The Syria (Sanctions) (Overseas Territories) Order 2020
1581 (W. 331)	The Food and Feed Hygiene and Safety (Miscellaneous Amendments and Saving Provision) (Wales) (EU Exit) Regulations 2020
1582	The Sanctions (Overseas Territories) (Amendment) Order 2020
1583	The Wireless Telegraphy (Automotive Short Range Radar) (Exemption) (Amendment) Regulations 2020
1584	The Civil Legal Aid (Financial Resources and Payment for Services) (Amendment) Regulations 2020
1585	The United Nations Sanctions (Revocations) Order 2020
1586	The Data Protection, Privacy and Electronic Communications (Amendments etc.) (EU Exit) Regulations 2020
1587	The Republic of Guinea-Bissau (Sanctions) (Overseas Territories) Order 2020
1588	The Counter-Terrorism (International Sanctions) (Overseas Territories) Order 2020
1589	The Yemen (Sanctions) (Overseas Territories) Order 2020
1590	The Animal Welfare and Invasive Non-native Species (Amendment etc.) (EU Exit) Regulations 2020
1591	The Mali (Sanctions) (Overseas Territories) Order 2020
1592	The Sudan (Sanctions) (Overseas Territories) Order 2020
1593	The Unmanned Aircraft (Amendment) (EU Exit) Regulations 2020
1594	The Human Medicines (Coronavirus) (Further Amendments) Regulations 2020
1595	The Health Protection (Coronavirus, International Travel) (England) (Amendment) (No. 29) Regulations 2020
1596	The Health Service Commissioner for England (Special Health Authorities) Order 2020
1597	The Social Security (Norway) Order 2020
1598	The Iran (Sanctions) (Human Rights) (Overseas Territories) Order 2020
1599	The Common Fisheries Policy (Amendment etc.) (EU Exit) (No. 2) Regulations 2020
1600	The Designation of Schools Having a Religious Character (Independent Schools) (England) (No. 2) Order 2020

== 1601-1669 ==
Number	Title
1601	The Designation of Schools Having a Religious Character (England) (No. 2) Order 2020
1602 (W. 332)	The Health Protection (Coronavirus, International Travel) (Wales) (Amendment) (No. 22) Regulations 2020
1603	The Legal Officers (Annual Fees) Order 2020
1604	The Sanctions (Overseas Territories) (Revocations) Order 2020
1605	The Customs (Northern Ireland) (EU Exit) Regulations 2020
1606 (W. 333)	The Education (Admission Appeals Arrangements) (Wales) (Coronavirus) (Amendment) (Amendment) Regulations 2020
1607 (W. 334)	The National Health Service (Charges to Overseas Visitors) (Amendment) (Wales) (EU Exit) Regulations 2020
1608	The ISIL (Da’esh) and Al-Qaida (United Nations Sanctions) (Overseas Territories) Order 2020
1609 (W. 335)	The Health Protection (Coronavirus Restrictions) (No. 5) (Wales) Regulations 2020
1610 (W. 336)	The Health Protection (Coronavirus Restrictions) (No. 5) (Wales) (Amendment) Regulations 2020
1611	The Health Protection (Coronavirus, Restrictions) (All Tiers and Obligations of Undertakings) (England) (Amendment) Regulations 2020
1612 (W. 337)	The Trade in Animals and Related Products (Wales) (Amendment) (EU Exit) Regulations 2020
1613	The Customs Safety and Security Procedures (EU Exit) Regulations 2020
1614 (W. 338)	The Landfill Disposals Tax (Tax Rates) (Wales) (Amendment) (No. 2) Regulations 2020
1615	The Power to Award Degrees etc. (The London Interdisciplinary School Ltd) Order 2020
1616	The Ozone-Depleting Substances and Fluorinated Greenhouse Gases (Amendment etc.) (EU Exit) Regulations 2020
1617	The Detergents (Amendment) (EU Exit) Regulations 2020
1618 (W. 339)	The Land Transaction Tax (Tax Bands and Tax Rates) (Wales) (Amendment) Regulations 2020
1619	The Travellers' Allowances and Miscellaneous Provisions (Northern Ireland) (EU Exit) Regulations 2020
1620	The Control of Mercury (Amendment) (EU Exit) Regulations 2020
1621 (C. 45)	The United Kingdom Internal Market Act 2020 (Commencement No. 1) Regulations 2020
1622 (C. 46)	The European Union (Withdrawal) Act 2018 and European Union (Withdrawal Agreement) Act 2020 (Commencement, Transitional and Savings Provisions) Regulations 2020
1623 (W. 340)	The Health Protection (Coronavirus Restrictions) (No. 5) (Wales) (Amendment) (No. 2) Regulations 2020
1624	The Customs Miscellaneous Non-fiscal Provisions and Amendments etc. (EU Exit) Regulations 2020
1625	The Prohibition on Quantitative Restrictions (EU Exit) Regulations 2020
1626 (W. 341)	The Regulation and Inspection of Social Care (Qualifications) (Wales) (Amendment) (EU Exit) Regulations 2020
1627	The Food and Drink (Amendment) (EU Exit) Regulations 2020
1628 (W. 342)	The Plant Health (Amendment etc.) (Wales) (EU Exit) Regulations 2020
1629	The Customs (Modification and Amendment) (EU Exit) Regulations 2020
1630	Not Allocated
1631	The Official Controls (Animals, Feed and Food, Plant Health etc.) (Amendment) (EU Exit) (No. 2) Regulations 2020
1632	The Operation of Air Services (Amendment) (EU Exit) Regulations 2020
1633 (W. 343)	The A55 Trunk Road (Junction 1 (Kingsland Roundabout) to Junction 5 (Treban Meurig), Anglesey) (Temporary Traffic Prohibitions & Restrictions) Order 2020
1634	The Representation of the People (Variation of Limits of Candidates’ Election Expenses) (England) Order 2020
1635	The Sea Fishing (Penalty Notices and Designation) (England) (Amendment) (EU Exit) Order 2020
1636	The Spirit Drinks, Wine and European Union Withdrawal (Consequential Modifications) (Amendment) (EU Exit) Regulations 2020
1637	The Agricultural Products, Food and Drink (Amendment etc.) (EU Exit) Regulations 2020
1638	The Statutory Sick Pay (General) (Coronavirus Amendment) (No. 7) Regulations 2020
1639 (W. 344)	The Official Controls (Animals, Feed and Food, Plant Health Fees etc.) (Wales) (Amendment) (EU Exit) Regulations 2020
1640 (C. 47)	The Excise Duties (Appointed Day) (EU Exit) Regulations 2020
1641 (C. 48)	The Value Added Tax and Excise Duties (Appointed Day) (EU Exit) Regulations 2020
1642 (C. 49)	The Finance Act 2016, Section 126 (Appointed Day), the Taxation (Cross-border Trade) Act 2018 (Appointed Day No. 8, Transition and Saving Provisions) and the Taxation (Post-transition Period) Act 2020 (Appointed Day No. 1) (EU Exit) Regulations 2020
1643 (C. 50)	The Customs and Tariff (Appointed Day) (EU Exit) Regulations 2020
1644	The Health Protection (Coronavirus, Travel from South Africa) (England) Regulations 2020
1645 (W. 345)	The Health Protection (Coronavirus, South Africa) (Wales) Regulations 2020
1646	The Health Protection (Coronavirus, Restrictions) (All Tiers) (England) (Amendment) (No. 3) Regulations 2020
1647	The Hazardous Substances and Packaging (Legislative Functions and Amendment) (EU Exit) Regulations 2020
1648 (C. 51) (W. 346)	The Agriculture Act 2020 (Commencement No. 1) (Wales) Regulations 2020
1649	The International Tax Enforcement (Disclosable Arrangements) (Amendment) (No. 2) (EU Exit) Regulations 2020
1650 (C. 52)	The Agriculture Act 2020 (Commencement No. 1) Regulations 2020
1651 (W. 347)	The A55 Trunk Road (Eastbound Carriageway from Junction 18 (Llandudno Junction) to Junction 20 (Brompton Avenue), Conwy County Borough) (Temporary Prohibition of Vehicles, Cyclists & Pedestrians) Order 2020
1652 (C. 53)	The Extradition (Provisional Arrest) Act 2020 (Commencement No. 1) Regulations 2020
1653	Not Allocated
1654	The Health Protection (Coronavirus, Restrictions) (All Tiers) (England) (Amendment) (No. 4) Regulations 2020
1655 (W. 348)	The A55 Trunk Road (Pen-y-clip Tunnel, Conwy County Borough) (Temporary Traffic Prohibitions & Restrictions) Order 2020
1656	The Hornsea Three Offshore Wind Farm Order 2020
1657	The Customs Tariff (Preferential Trade Arrangements and Tariff Quotas) (Amendment) (EU Exit) Regulations 2020
1658	The Drivers' Hours and Tachographs (Amendment) Regulations 2020
1659	The National Health Service (Charges to Overseas Visitors) (Amendment) (EU Exit) (No. 2) Regulations 2020
1660	The Protecting against the Effects of the Extraterritorial Application of Third Country Legislation (Amendment) (EU Exit) Regulations 2020
1661	The Agricultural Products, Food and Drink (Amendment) (EU Exit) Regulations 2020
1662 (C. 54)	The European Union (Future Relationship) Act 2020 (Commencement No. 1) Regulations 2020
1663	The Network Rail (Suffolk Level Crossing Reduction) Order 2020
1664	The Conflict Minerals (Compliance) (Northern Ireland) (EU Exit) Regulations 2020
1665	The Libya (Sanctions) (EU Exit) Regulations 2020
1666	The Meat Preparations (Amendment and Transitory Modification) (England) (EU Exit) Regulations 2020
1667	Not Allocated
1668	The Trade in Endangered Species of Wild Fauna and Flora (Commission Regulation (EC) No 865/2006) (Amendment) Regulations 2020
1669	The Organic Production (Organic Indications) (Amendment) (EU Exit) Regulations 2020
