= List of COVID-19 pandemic legislation =

This is a list of legislation passed in response to the COVID-19 pandemic.

== China ==
- Decision of the Standing Committee of the National People's Congress to Comprehensively Prohibit the Illegal Trade of Wild Animals, Break the Bad Habit of Excessive Consumption of Wild Animals, and Effectively Secure the Life and Health of the People

== Hong Kong ==
- Emergency (Exemption from Statutory Requirements) (COVID-19) Regulation

== Ireland ==
- Health (Preservation and Protection and other Emergency Measures in the Public Interest) Act 2020
- Emergency Measures in the Public Interest (COVID-19) Act 2020

== New Zealand ==
- COVID-19 Public Health Response Act 2020

== Philippines ==
- Bayanihan to Heal as One Act
- Bayanihan to Recover as One Act

== Singapore ==
- COVID-19 (Temporary Measures) Act 2020
- Revised Supplementary Supply (FY 2020) Act 2020
- Parliamentary Elections (COVID-19 Special Arrangements) Act 2020
- Constitution of the Republic of Singapore (Amendment) Act 2020
- COVID-19 (Temporary Measures for Solemnization and Registration of Marriages) Act 2020

== Taiwan ==
- Special Act for Prevention, Relief and Revitalization Measures for Severe Pneumonia with Novel Pathogens

== United Kingdom ==
=== Primary legislation ===
- Business and Planning Act 2020
- Contingencies Fund Act 2020
- Coronavirus Act 2020
- Coronavirus (Scotland) Act 2020
- Corporate Insolvency and Governance Act 2020
- Stamp Duty Land Tax (Temporary Relief) Act 2020

=== Significant secondary legislation ===
- Health Protection (Coronavirus) Regulations 2020
- Health Protection (Coronavirus, Restrictions) (England) Regulations 2020
- Health Protection (Coronavirus, Restrictions) (No. 2) (England) Regulations 2020
- Health Protection (Coronavirus, Restrictions) (England) (No. 3) Regulations 2020
- Health Protection (Face Coverings on Public Transport) (England) Regulations 2020
- Health Protection (Face Coverings in a Relevant Place) (England) Regulations 2020
- Health Protection (Coronavirus, International Travel) (England) Regulations 2020
- The Health Protection (Coronavirus, Restrictions) (Self-Isolation) (England) Regulations 2020
- First COVID-19 tier regulations in England
- Second COVID-19 tier regulations in England

== United States ==
- Coronavirus Preparedness and Response Supplemental Appropriations Act, 2020 – March 2020
- Families First Coronavirus Response Act – March 2020
- Coronavirus Aid, Relief, and Economic Security Act (CARES Act) – Includes $1200 stimulus checks, March 2020
- Paycheck Protection Program and Health Care Enhancement Act – April 2020
- Paycheck Protection Program Flexibility Act of 2020 – June 2020
- A bill to extend the authority for commitments for the paycheck protection program – July 2020
- Consolidated Appropriations Act, 2021 – Includes $600 stimulus checks, December 2020
- American Rescue Plan Act of 2021 – Includes $1400 stimulus checks, March 2021
- Inflation Reduction Act of 2022 – August 2022
