= Health Protection (Coronavirus, Restrictions) (No. 2) (England) Regulations 2020 =

United Kingdom emergency legislation

- Statutory Instrument
- Parliament of the United Kingdom
- Citation: SI 2020/684
- Introduced by: Matt Hancock, Secretary of State for Health and Social Care
- Territorial extent: England, with exclusions in local lockdown areas

Dates
- Made: 3 July 2020
- Laid before Parliament: 3 July 2020
- Commencement: 4 July 2020
- Expired: 4 January 2021

Other legislation
- Repeals/revokes: The Health Protection (Coronavirus, Restrictions) (England) Regulations 2020
- Made under: Public Health (Control of Disease) Act 1984

Status: Expired

Text of the Health Protection (Coronavirus, Restrictions) (No. 2) (England) Regulations 2020 as in force today (including any amendments) within the United Kingdom, from legislation.gov.uk.

The Health Protection (Coronavirus, Restrictions) (No. 2) (England) Regulations 2020 (SI 2020/684) is a statutory instrument (SI) enacted on 4 July 2020 by the Secretary of State for Health and Social Care, Matt Hancock, in response to the COVID-19 pandemic. It replaced and relaxed the previous Lockdown Regulations (SI 2020/350), and gave the Secretary of State powers to make declarations restricting access to public outdoor places.

This SI related to England only; there were similar regulations for Wales, Scotland and Northern Ireland. Within England, Leicester was initially excluded to its high rate of COVID-19. Subsequent amendments were made to enable more restrictive local rules to be applied in other areas.

The regulations were substantially amended on 14 October 2020 by the First COVID-19 tier regulations, and expired on 4 January 2021.

== Context and earlier regulations ==
The first responses by the UK government to the developing COVID-19 pandemic in England took the form of guidance rather than legislation. Statements by the prime minister and other ministers included advice to schools to cancel trips abroad (12 March); to the public to avoid non-essential travel, crowded places such as pubs and theatres, mass gatherings, and visits to care homes (16 March); and escalated to the closure of schools, colleges and nurseries (announced 18 March, effective 21 March).

=== Initial regulations, from 21 March 2020 ===
On 21 March under emergency powers the government enacted the Health Protection (Coronavirus, Business Closure) (England) Regulations 2020 (SI 2020/327) which enforced the closure in England of businesses selling food and drink for consumption on the premises, as well as a range of other businesses such as nightclubs and indoor leisure centres where a high risk of infection could be expected. SI 2020/350 revoked SI 2020/327, which had come into force only five days earlier, and re-enacted most of its provisions with more extensive restrictions.

=== Lockdown Regulations, from 26 March 2020 ===
The Health Protection (Coronavirus, Restrictions) (England) Regulations 2020 (SI 2020/350), informally known as "the Lockdown Regulations", replaced SI 2020/327 on 26 March 2020 with a series of more stringent restrictions. These regulations became the principal delegated English legislation restricting freedom of movement, gatherings, and business closures during the COVID-19 emergency period. There were four primary amendments to SI 2020/327, progressively relaxing the rules, on 22 April, 13 May, 1 June, and 13/15 June. On 4 July 2020, SI 2020/350 was repealed and replaced by these regulations, SI 2020/684.

== Regulations ==
=== Legal basis ===
The Health Protection (Coronavirus, Restrictions) (No. 2) (England) Regulations 2020 (SI 2020/684) was introduced by way of a Statutory Instrument made by the Secretary of State for Health and Social Care, Matt Hancock, using emergency powers available to him under the Public Health (Control of Disease) Act 1984. The regulations themselves state the legal basis for using such powers, namely "the serious and imminent threat to public health which is posed by the incidence and spread of severe acute respiratory syndrome coronavirus 2 (SARS-CoV-2) in England"; he also certified that the restrictions "are proportionate to what they seek to achieve, which is a public health response to that threat."

The regulations were laid before parliament at 3.00pm on 3 July, the day before the regulations came into force. The Secretary of State once again used section 45R of the Public Health (Control of Disease) Act 1984 to enact the regulations immediately subject to retrospective approval by resolution of each House of Parliament within twenty-eight days. In the regulations themselves he stated that "by reason of urgency, it is necessary to make this instrument" without having first placed a draft before parliament for prior discussion and approval.

=== Scope and review ===
The regulations (which applied in England only), imposed restrictions during the "emergency period" which effectively re-enacted the identically-named period first defined in the Lockdown Regulations SI 2020/350, as amended. The Secretary of State was given the power to define the end of the period. He was required to review the regulations at least every 28 days, and to terminate any restriction that he considered to be no longer necessary.

The regulations initially did not apply in the city of Leicester and the surrounding area. Special rules were in force there from 4 July 2020, as set out in The Health Protection (Coronavirus, Restrictions) (Leicester) Regulations 2020 (SI 2020/685), later partly relaxed.

=== Commencement ===
The regulations as a whole came into effect at 0.01 am on 4 July 2020, though relaxation of the business closure rules allowing many venues to re-open was deferred until 6.00 am on the same day. According to a government spokesman this was a "sensible precaution" to avoid midnight parties.

=== Business closures ===
The previous list of businesses required to close was revoked and re-enacted, with fewer restrictions. The only businesses that were still completely barred from re-opening were nightclubs, dance halls, bowling alleys, discotheques; sexual entertainment venues; casinos; nail bars and tanning booths; spas and beauty salons (except hairdressers); massage parlours, tattoo parlours and body piercing services; indoor and outdoor swimming pools; and indoor skating rinks, play areas, gyms, sports courts, and fitness and dance studios. Some exceptions were made for elite athletes, and professional dancers and choreographers. Most trade shows, exhibitions and conferences were still not permitted.

Premises previously forced to close but which were permitted under the regulations to re-open (unless they offered services mentioned in the list above) included cafes, bars, pubs; theatres, concert halls, cinemas, museums, galleries, leisure and entertainment venues; social clubs, bingo halls; hairdressers; funfairs, theme parks, model villages; outdoor skating rinks, play areas, gyms and sports courts; indoor attractions at heritage sites, farms, zoos and safari parks; and libraries. Places of worship could re-open generally and were no longer, as previously, restricted to opening for private prayer.

==== Government guidance ====
Although the regulations allowed theatres and concert halls to re-open, separate non-enforceable government guidance published on 3 July 2020 stated, "At this time, venues should not permit live performances, including drama, comedy and music, to take place in front of a live audience. This is important to mitigate the risks of aerosol transmission – from either the performer(s) or their audience."

=== Restrictions on gatherings ===
The previous Lockdown Regulations were revoked, and were replaced with a new regime regulating gatherings of over 30 people. Most indoor gatherings of any size were allowed, but subject to a limit of 30 for gatherings at private dwellings. Public outdoor gatherings of up to 30 were also allowed, but most larger public gatherings remained banned.

Subject to a few exceptions, all gatherings of more than 30 people within a private dwelling, or in an adjacent garden or yard, remained prohibited. For this purpose, the following were not considered to be 'private dwellings', and so could in principle have larger gatherings: hotels, hostels, campsites, caravan parks, B&Bs, care homes, children's homes, military accommodation and prisons. Also not considered to be private dwellings were boarding schools and student halls of residence.

All indoor raves regardless of the number of participants were prohibited (outdoor raves were already liable to be broken up by the police under section 63(1) of the Public Order Act 1994).

Generally, public outdoor gatherings of more than 30 were not allowed, unless at an outdoor visitor attraction or at an organization's operational premises. Larger outdoor gatherings on public land were permitted only if they had been organised by a business, charity, public or political body, a risk assessment had been carried out, and all reasonable measures had been taken to limit virus transmission.

There were some exceptions where otherwise-prohibited gatherings of more than 30 were allowed:

- Where reasonably necessary for work, voluntary or charitable purposes; or education or training
- Where reasonably necessary for childcare
- Where reasonably necessary to provide emergency assistance; or to avoid injury or illness or to escape a risk of harm
- Certain exceptions for elite sportspersons
- To fulfil a legal obligation.

==== Government guidance ====
The government's non-enforceable guidance on social distancing was more restrictive than the legal regulations. The guidance stated that from 4 July "you can meet in groups of up to two households (anyone in your support bubble counts as one household) in any location – public or private, indoors or outdoors. You do not always have to meet with the same household – you can meet with different households at different times. However, it remains the case – even inside someone’s home – that you should socially distance from anyone not in your household or bubble". When outside, "you can continue to meet in groups of up to six people from different households, following social distancing guidelines."

=== Power to restrict access to public places ===
The Secretary of State was given the power to make declarations restricting access to public outdoor places anywhere in England, either to a specified place or to all places of a given description. Once he had made such a declaration, access restrictions had to be enforced by the owner of the land or the local authority, and it became a criminal offence for anyone apart from the owner or occupier to enter the land without a reasonable excuse.

Any direction to restrict access to public places had to be reviewed by the Secretary of State at least once every seven days. The owner or occupier of the land could appeal to the Magistrates Court against the direction.

=== Offences and enforcement ===
Enforcement of the regulations was in the hands of the police, with provision being made for the local authority and the Secretary of State to designate additional people for some purposes.

It was a criminal offence to breach the restrictions on business closures, restrictions on gatherings, or public spaces that the Secretary of State had declared closed. Fixed penalty notices could be issued, or offenders prosecuted.

=== Amendment and expiry ===
The regulations were amended to implement relaxations in July and August 2020, and were then made more restrictive by further amendments in September, as outlined below. On 14 October, the regulations and accumulated amendments were substantially changed by the First COVID-19 tier regulations.

The regulation as initially enacted (but not all later amendments) automatically expired on 4 January 2021, six months after enactment.

== Re-opening of some businesses, 11 and 13 July 2020 ==
The regulations were amended on 22 April 2020, after 7 days, by the Health Protection (Coronavirus, Restrictions) (No. 2) (England) (Amendment) Regulations 2020 (SI 2020/719).

=== Legal basis ===
The amendments were made under the same emergency powers as the main regulations. They were laid before parliament on 10 July 2020, and came into force on 11 and 13 July. The Secretary of State again used section 45R of the 1984 act to enact the regulations "by reason of urgency" subject to retrospective approval by resolution of each House of Parliament within twenty-eight days.

=== Changes to the regulations ===
The amendments allowed certain businesses to re-open, specifically outdoor swimming pools and water parks (from 11 July 2020); and nail bars and salons, tanning booths and salons, spas and beauty salons, massage parlours, tattoo parlours, and body and skin piercing services (from 13 July 2020).

== Re-opening of some businesses, 25 July 2020 ==
The regulations were amended on 25 July 2020, after a further 14 days, by the Health Protection (Coronavirus, Restrictions) (No. 2) (England) (Amendment) (No. 2) Regulations 2020 (SI 2020/788).

=== Legal basis ===
The amendments were made under the same emergency powers as the main regulations. They were laid before Parliament on 23 July 2020, and came into force on 25 July. The Secretary of State again used section 45R of the 1984 act to enact the regulations "by reason of urgency" subject to retrospective approval by resolution of each House of Parliament within twenty-eight days.

=== Changes to the regulations ===
The amendments allowed certain businesses to re-open, specifically indoor swimming pools, including indoor facilities at water parks, indoor fitness and dance studios and indoor gyms and sports courts and facilities.

== Re-opening of some businesses, 15 August 2020 ==
The regulations were amended on 15 August 2020, after a further 21 days, by the Health Protection (Coronavirus, Restrictions) (No. 2) (England) (Amendment) (No. 3) Regulations 2020 (SI 2020/863).

=== Legal basis ===
The amendments were made under the same emergency powers as the main regulations. They were laid before parliament on 14 August 2020, and came into force on 15 August. The Secretary of State again used section 45R of the 1984 act to enact the regulations "by reason of urgency" subject to retrospective approval by resolution of each House of Parliament within twenty-eight days.

=== Changes to the regulations ===
The amendments allowed certain further businesses to re-open, specifically indoor casinos, indoor skating rinks, indoor play areas, bowling alleys and conference centres and exhibition halls. A separate government press release noted that nightclubs, dance halls, and discotheques, as well as sexual entertainment venues and hostess bars, must remain closed.

== £10,000 penalty for hosting large gatherings, 28 August 2020 ==
The regulations were further amended on 28 August 2020 by the Health Protection (Coronavirus) (Restrictions on Holding of Gatherings and Amendment) (England) Regulations 2020 (SI 2020/907) to introduce a £10,000 penalty for those hosting or facilitating gatherings of more than 30 people.

Anyone who, without reasonable excuse, hosted or facilitated a gathering of more than thirty people that:

- constitutes an indoor rave (as defined by s. 63 of the Criminal Justice and Public Order Act 1994),
- takes place in a private dwelling (or in an adjacent garden or yard), or
- takes place in a public outdoor space (other than land used as a visitor attraction, or which is part of business or charitable premises)

was liable to a fixed penalty of £10,000. Once a penalty notice had been issued, there was no discretion as to the amount, which the regulations specify "must be £10,000".

The penalty did not apply to anyone hosting a larger gathering that was specifically permitted, including those that were:

- reasonably necessary for work, voluntary or charitable purposes; or education or training
- reasonably necessary for childcare
- reasonably necessary to provide emergency assistance; or to avoid injury or illness or to escape a risk of harm
- intended for elite sportspersons
- to fulfil a legal obligation.

Businesses, charities and public or political bodies that hosted larger events on land used as a visitor attraction, or which was part of business or charitable premises, were also exempt from the penalty provided that a risk assessment had been carried out and all reasonable measures taken to limit virus transmission.

Breaches of the regulations (other than for hosting or facilitating a gathering of the type described above) attracted a fixed penalty of £100.

== 'Rule of six' regulations, 14 September 2020 ==
The regulations were further amended with effect from 14 September 2020 by the Health Protection (Coronavirus, Restrictions) (No. 2) (England) (Amendment) (No. 4) Regulations 2020 (SI 2020/986) to reduce the permitted gathering size for most gatherings from thirty people to six, except for members of the same household or linked households, or where an exemption applied. Government statements referred to this as "the rule of six".

=== Legal basis ===
As with the original regulations, SI 2020/986 was made using emergency powers under the Public Health (Control of Disease) Act 1984, this time by the Home Secretary, Priti Patel, to enact the regulations "by reason of urgency" subject to retrospective approval by resolution of each House of Parliament within twenty-eight days. The legal basis for the use of the powers was stated to be as before.

=== 'Rule of six' ===
The new general rule, subject to some exceptions, was that gatherings of more than six people were banned. Most distinctions between indoor and outdoor gatherings were removed, and the regulations applied to gatherings in private dwellings and indoor public spaces as well as elsewhere.

The regulations did not loosen any stricter local regulations which applied in certain regions of England, specifically in those regions where smaller gatherings in private dwellings were already prohibited.

=== Linked households ===
The concept of "linked households" introduced on 15 June by SI 2020/588 was revived. A household containing exactly one adult (no more) and any number of children could form a permanent link with one other household of any size (such linked households were referred to in government statements as "support bubbles"). Households which were already linked under earlier regulations could not link with any other household.

Gatherings of any size where all attendees were part of the same household, or of two linked households, were permitted.

=== Larger organised gatherings ===
For the first time, the regulations allowed for the possibility of multiple groups of people attending certain larger organised gatherings, with each group remaining separate from all the others. For this to be permitted, each group (called a "qualifying group") had to be of no more than six people unless all members were from the same or a linked household. The qualifying groups had to remain separate, and people were not permitted to join any other group nor mingle with anyone outside their own group.

Such gatherings were permitted indoors or at a premises (other than in a private dwelling) only where operated by a business, a charitable, benevolent or philanthropic institution, or a public body. They were permitted in a public outdoor space only if organised by one of the above, or a political body, and where a risk assessment had been carried out.

=== Other exceptions ===
Gatherings of more than six people from separate or non-linked households were also allowed in the following circumstances, some of which were newly introduced by the regulations:

Permitted gatherings
Type of gathering	Locations	Formal organiser* required	Risk assessment required	Maximum attendees
Elite sportspeople and coaches	Any	No	No	Any
Work, voluntary, or charitable services	Any	No	No	Any
Education, training, or childcare	Any	No	No	Any
Emergency assistance, avoiding injury, illness, or harm	Any	No	No	Any
Providing care or assistance to a vulnerable person	Any	No	No	Any
Facilitating contact between parents and children where they live apart	Any	No	No	Any
Fulfilling a legal obligation	Any	No	No	Any
Support groups	Any	Yes	No	Any
Marriage or civil ceremony	Religious or approved premises	No	Yes	30
Significant event gathering *	Relevant premises* other than a private dwelling, or certain public outdoor spaces	No	Yes	30
Wedding or civil partnership reception	In premises other than a private dwelling	No	Yes	30
Protests	Any	Yes (including a political body)	Yes	Any
Organised non-elite sports	Relevant premises* or outdoors	Yes	Yes	Any number of players; no spectators
Gatherings in prisons etc	Criminal justice accommodation	No	No	Any
Relevant outdoor activity *	Outdoors	No	Yes	Any
Attending a person giving birth	Any	No	No	Any

Terms marked with an asterisk in the above table:

- "formal organiser" meant a business, a charitable, benevolent or philanthropic institution, or a public body
- "relevant premises" meant premises which are operated by a formal organiser
- "relevant outdoor activity" meant an outdoor physical activity for which a licence or permit issued by a public body (other than a driving licence or a food or alcohol licence) was required; Government guidance stated that this covered shooting and hunting
- "significant event gathering" meant a gathering to celebrate a significant milestone in a person's life such as a coming of age or a rite of passage according to their religion or belief. Standard birthdays were not considered significant for this purpose. Gatherings for a funeral or commemoration of a life were included, but there was no allowance for wakes, which were not permitted to involve a gathering of more than six.

=== Penalties ===
The £10,000 penalty for organising certain gatherings introduced on 28 August applied to gatherings not listed in the above categories of permitted gathering. Other penalties for participating in a forbidden gathering remained in place.

=== Late publication of the 'Rule of six' regulations ===
The regulations were published only around 30 minutes before they were due to come into effect at 00:01 on 14 September and were laid before parliament after that, at 10:30. It was reported in the press that the addition of the "relevant outdoor activity" exemption, covering hunting and shooting, held up publication until shortly before the new law was due take effect.

== Contact details and QR codes, 18 & 24 September 2020 ==
On 18 September 2020 the Health Protection (Coronavirus, Collection of Contact Details etc and Related Requirements) Regulations 2020 (SI 2020/1005) came into force. These regulations required certain businesses to obtain the contact details of people entering the premises, and to refuse entry to those who did not. They also required businesses to display an approved QR code to be scanned as an alternative to providing contact details.

The regulations relating to contact details came into force on 18 September. The regulations covering display and use of a QR code came into force on 24 September 2020.

=== Legal basis ===
As with the original regulations, SI 2020/1005 was introduced using emergency powers under the Public Health (Control of Disease) Act 1984 to enact the regulations "by reason of urgency" subject to retrospective approval by resolution of each House of Parliament within twenty-eight days. The regulations were made by Matt Hancock.

=== Services and settings covered ===
The regulations applied to businesses and service providers selling food and drink for consumption on the premises (including restaurants, cafes, bars and pubs), as well as many leisure and tourism services, close physical contact services, and social/recreational/cultural services in community centres and village halls. The 'premises' for this purpose could be indoors or outdoors. Government guidance provided a list of "in scope" services and settings.

=== Requirement to display QR Code ===
Every business or service provider covered by the regulations had to display an approved QR code that could be scanned with a smartphone by people entering the premises. It became a criminal offence not to display a code from 24 September 2020.

=== Requirement to request and retain contact details ===
Whenever anyone over the age of 16 entered the premises, the business or service provider had either to ensure that the person has scanned the QR code, or had to request contact details including name and (in order of precedence) phone number, email address or postal address. Where people entered in a group, the number of people in the group also had to be requested.

These rules applied to anyone entering the premises (including customers, staff and volunteers), unless exempt. Exemptions were made where a person entered for the sole purpose of making postal, courier or other deliveries and collections; and for police officers and emergency responders in the course of their duty.

Where a person entering the premises was expected to interact with only a single member of staff, the name of that staff member also had to be recorded.

The recorded contact details had to be held securely for 21 days, and released on request to the Secretary of State or a Public Health Officer. After 21 days the details had to be destroyed.

=== Requirement to request details from groups ===
Where a group sought entry, the business or service provider had to obtain contact details from every group member, apart from those who had scanned the QR code or who were under 16. Either each group member could provide details individually, or one group member could provide details for the group as a whole. Where a group was larger than six (for example where they were all of the same household or linked households), they had to be treated as separate sub-groups of no more than six for this purpose.

From 29 March 2021, the Health Protection (Coronavirus, Restrictions) (Steps) (England) Regulations 2021 (SI 2021/364) (the "Steps" regulations) deleted the clauses relating to groups, instead requiring each member of the group to provide their own contact details as if entering the venue alone.

=== Requirement to refuse entry ===
If anyone seeking entry for the purpose of consuming food or drink neither provided the requested information in full, nor scanned the QR code, admission had to be refused. This requirement did not apply to the non food and drink establishments listed above.

=== Penalties ===
Businesses or service providers breaching certain of the regulations could receive a fixed penalty of £1000 (£500 if paid in 14 days), rising to £4000 for repeated violations. Offenders could also be prosecuted. Breaches subject to penalty or prosecution were:

- Failing to display a QR code (from 24 September 2020)
- Failing to request contact details from a person or a group entering a premises
- Failing to record the single member of staff or volunteer whom a visitor comes into contact with
- Failing to retain the contact details securely
- Failing to delete contact details after 21 days unless there is another basis to retain them
- Non-compliance with a request from the Secretary of State or a Public Health Officer to disclose contact details

It was not an offence for members of the public to fail to provide valid contact details, nor for a premises to fail to refuse entry to customers who fail to provide valid contact details.

From 28 September, SI 2020/1045 amended the maximum fine to £10,000.

=== Expiry ===
These regulations were set to expire 12 months after they came into force.

== Pubs etc to enforce social distancing, 18 September 2020 ==
The Health Protection (Coronavirus, Restrictions) (Obligations of Hospitality Undertakings) (England) Regulations 2020 (SI 2020/1008) also came into effect on 18 September. These regulations imposed requirements on the hospitality industry to take measures to ensure social distancing.

=== Legal basis ===
As with the original regulations, SI 2020/1008 was introduced using emergency powers under the Public Health (Control of Disease) Act 1984 to enact the regulations "by reason of urgency" subject to retrospective approval by resolution of each House of Parliament within twenty-eight days. The regulations were made by the secretary of state, Nadhim Zahawi.

=== Changes to the regulations ===
Pubs, cafes, restaurants and other businesses that provided food or drink for consumption on the premises had to take reasonable measures to ensure that

- groups of more than six were not allowed admission to the premises,
- people from one group were not allowed to mingle with those from another,
- bookings for tables of more than six were no longer accepted, and
- an 'appropriate distance' was maintained between tables used by different groups.

Larger groups were permitted when all members were from the same or a linked household.

There was an 'appropriate distance' between tables when they were spaced apart by at least two metres; or by at least one metre with

- barriers or screens, or
- back to back seating, or the tables being otherwise arranged to ensure that persons sitting at one table do not face any person sitting at another table at a distance of less than two metres, or
- other measures to limit virus transmission.

=== Penalties ===
Infringement of the regulations could result in a fixed penalty notice of £1000, rising to £4000 for repeated violations. Offenders could also be prosecuted.

=== Expiry ===
These regulations were set to expire on 17 September 2021.

=== Amendments of 28 September 2020 ===
These regulations were amended with effect from 28 September 2020 by the Health Protection (Coronavirus, Restrictions) (Obligations of Undertakings) (England) (Amendment) Regulations 2020 (SI 2020/1046). From that date the word “Hospitality” was omitted from the title of the regulations and the following changes were made:

- The requirement to refuse bookings of more than six people, to admit groups of more than six to the premises, or to allow members of different groups to mingle, was extended to leisure, tourism, and close physical contact services, as well as to community and village halls.
- Pubs, cafes, restaurants and bars were required to take all reasonable measures to prevent singing by customers in groups of more than six, and to prevent dancing on the premises. There was an exception for weddings, civil partnerships, and associated receptions for the couple (only).
- The playing of recorded music at pubs, cafes, restaurants and bars was limited in volume to 85 db(A).

The 28 September amendments also required anyone responsible for premises where a face covering was compulsory to display a conspicuous notice or to otherwise ensure that people entering were aware of the requirement. It also prohibited the person responsible from preventing or seeking to prevent the wearing of a face covering by anyone required to wear one.

== Opening hours restrictions, smaller gatherings, 24 & 28 Sept 2020 ==
The regulations were further amended on 23 September 2020 by the Health Protection (Coronavirus, Restrictions) (No. 2) (England) (Amendment) (No. 5) Regulations 2020 (SI 2020/1029).

=== Legal basis ===
SI 2020/1029 was made by Lord Bethell, using emergency powers under the Public Health (Control of Disease) Act 1984. The legal basis for the use of the powers was stated to be as before. The regulations were laid before parliament on 24 September 2020, and mostly came into force at 05:00 on 24 September. The Under-Secretary used section 45R of the 1984 act to enact the regulations "by reason of urgency" subject to retrospective approval by resolution of each House of Parliament within twenty-eight days.

=== Overnight closures ===
From 24 September the following businesses were required to close between 22:00 and 05:00 daily: restaurants, food and drink takeaways (but not supermarkets, convenience stores, pharmacists or filling stations), cafes and workplace canteens, bars, pubs, social clubs, casinos, bowling alleys, cinemas, theatres, amusement arcades or other indoor leisure centres or facilities, funfairs (indoors or outdoors), theme and adventure parks and activities, bingo halls, and concert halls.

==== Exemptions ====
Cinemas, theatres and concert halls could remain open after 22:00 for the purpose of completing performances which began before that time.

Businesses could continue to sell food or drink between 22:00 and 05:00 by way of a delivery service in response to orders made online, by phone, text or post. Overnight drive-throughs could also remain in operation, and overnight food and drink could continue to be provided by motorway service stations.

=== Table service and customer seating ===
New table service and customer seating rules were applied to certain venues, namely restaurants, cafes and workplace canteens, bars, pubs, social clubs and casinos, and to food and drink takeaways (other than supermarkets, convenience stores, pharmacists and filling stations).

Such venues selling alcohol were required to serve all food and drink to customers seated at tables. Customers had to order at the table, and to remain seated while eating and drinking. Such venues not selling alcohol were not required to serve customers at a table, but they had to ensure that customers eating and drinking on the premises remained seated.

=== Reductions in permitted gatherings ===
From 24 September, the exception to the rule of six for large 'significant event gatherings' was abolished, and such gatherings were restricted to six people. Gatherings for funerals could, however, still be of up to 30. The maximum attendance at support group meetings reduced from 30 to 15, and such meetings could no longer take place at private dwellings. Non-elite sports gatherings of more than six people could no longer take place indoors unless the participants were disabled.

From 28 September, the legally-permitted maximum attendance at wedding and civil partnership ceremonies and their associated receptions reduced from 30 to 15. Government guidance stated that anyone who was working was not counted towards this limit.

=== Penalties ===
Contravening the overnight closure or table service and customer seating requirements could result in a fixed penalty notice for £1,000, rising on a sliding scale to £10,000 for fourth and subsequent breaches. Penalties relating to the permitted gatherings rules were doubled from £200 to £6,400 depending on the number of breaches. Offenders could also be prosecuted.

== Local lockdown exceptions ==
SI 2020/684 defined the general rules that applied across most of England, though the Leicester area was initially excluded due to higher rates of coronavirus there. Subsequent amendments later applied more restrictive rules to many other local areas.

== Related legislation ==
The Health Protection (Coronavirus, Restrictions) (England) (No. 3) Regulations 2020 (SI 2020/750), which came into force on 18 July 2020, gave local authorities power to give directions affecting premises, events and public open spaces within their areas.

== See also ==
- Health Protection (Coronavirus, Restrictions) (England) Regulations 2020 (the 'Lockdown Regulations')
- Health Protection (Coronavirus, International Travel) (England) Regulations 2020
- Coronavirus Act 2020
- Health Protection (Coronavirus) Regulations 2020
- List of statutory instruments of the United Kingdom, 2020

== Bibliography ==
- "SI 327". Legislation.gov.uk. 21 March 2020. The Health Protection (Coronavirus, Business Closure) (England) Regulations 2020.
- "SI 350". Legislation.gov.uk. 26 March 2020. The Health Protection (Coronavirus, Restrictions) (England) Regulations 2020.
- "SI 588". Legislation.gov.uk. 12 June 2020. The Health Protection (Coronavirus, Restrictions) (England) (Amendment) (No 4) Regulations 2020.
- "SI 684". Legislation.gov.uk. 4 July 2020. The Health Protection (Coronavirus, Restrictions) (England) (No. 2) Regulations 2020.
- "SI 719". Legislation.gov.uk. 11 July 2020. The Health Protection (Coronavirus, Restrictions) (England) (No. 2) (Amendment) Regulations 2020.
- "SI 788". Legislation.gov.uk. 25 July 2020. The Health Protection (Coronavirus, Restrictions) (England) (No. 2) (Amendment) Regulations 2020.
- "SI 863". Legislation.gov.uk. 15 August 2020. The Health Protection (Coronavirus, Restrictions) (No. 2) (England) (Amendment) (No. 3) Regulations 2020.
- "SI 907". Legislation.gov.uk. 28 August 2020. The Health Protection (Coronavirus, Restrictions on Holding of Gatherings and Amendment) (England) Regulations 2020.
- "SI 986". Legislation.gov.uk. 13 September 2020. The Health Protection (Coronavirus, Restrictions) (No. 2) (England) (Amendment) (No. 4) Regulations 2020.
- "SI 1005". Legislation.gov.uk. 17 September 2020. The Health Protection (Coronavirus, Collection of Contact Details etc and Related Requirements) Regulations 2020.
- "SI 1008". Legislation.gov.uk. 18 September 2020. The Health Protection (Coronavirus, Restrictions) (Obligations of Hospitality Undertakings) (England) Regulations 2020.
- "SI 1029". Legislation.gov.uk. 23 September 2020. The Health Protection (Coronavirus, Restrictions) (No. 2) (England) (Amendment) (No. 5) (England) Regulations 2020.
- "SI 1045". Legislation.gov.uk. 28 September 2020. The Health Protection (Coronavirus, Restrictions) (Self-Isolation) (England) Regulations 2020.
- "SI 1046". Legislation.gov.uk. 28 September 2020. The Health Protection (Coronavirus, Restrictions) (Obligations of Undertakings) (England) (Amendment) Regulations 2020.
- "SI 1103". Legislation.gov.uk. 14 October 2020. The Health Protection (Coronavirus, Local COVID-19 Alert Level) (Medium) (England) Regulations 2020.
- "SI 364". Legislation.gov.uk. 29 March 2021. The Health Protection (Coronavirus, Restrictions) (Steps) (England) Regulations 2021.
