= Health Protection (Coronavirus, Restrictions) (England) (No. 3) Regulations 2020 =

United Kingdom emergency legislation

- Statutory Instrument
- Parliament of the United Kingdom
- Citation: SI 2020/750
- Introduced by: Matt Hancock, Secretary of State for Health and Social Care
- Territorial extent: England

Dates
- Made: 16 July 2020
- Laid before Parliament: 17 July 2020
- Commencement: 18 July 2020
- Revoked: 24 February 2022

Other legislation
- Made under: Public Health (Control of Disease) Act 1984
- Revoked by: Health Protection (Coronavirus, Restrictions) (Self-Isolation etc.) (Revocation) (England) Regulations 2022

Status: Revoked

Text of the Health Protection (Coronavirus, Restrictions) (England) (No. 3) Regulations 2020 as in force today (including any amendments) within the United Kingdom, from legislation.gov.uk.

The Health Protection (Coronavirus, Restrictions) (England) (No. 3) Regulations 2020 (SI 2020/750) is a statutory instrument (SI) enacted on 18 July 2020 by the Secretary of State for Health and Social Care, Matt Hancock, in response to the COVID-19 pandemic. It allowed a local authority to make directions relating to premises, events and outdoor public spaces in its area, supplementing central government powers relating to public outdoor places that were granted to the Secretary of State on 3 July in the Health Protection (Coronavirus, Restrictions) (No. 2) (England) Regulations 2020 (SI 2020/684). In practice, the regulations allowed local authorities to close shops and outdoor public spaces, and to cancel events. The regulations related to England only.

The regulations were revoked on 24 February 2022.

== Legal basis ==
SI 2020/750 was introduced by way of a statutory instrument made by the Secretary of State for Health and Social Care, Matt Hancock, using emergency powers available to him under the Public Health (Control of Disease) Act 1984. The regulations themselves stated the legal basis for using such powers, namely "the serious and imminent threat to public health which is posed by the incidence and spread of severe acute respiratory syndrome coronavirus 2 (SARS-CoV-2) in England".

The regulations were laid before parliament on 17 July, the day before the regulations came into force. The Secretary of State again used section 45R of the Public Health (Control of Disease) Act 1984 to enact the regulations immediately, subject to retrospective approval by resolution of each House of Parliament within twenty-eight days, a period extended into September by the summer recess. In the regulations themselves he stated that "by reason of urgency, it is necessary to make this instrument" without having first placed a draft before parliament for prior discussion and approval.

=== Commencement and scope ===
The regulations (which applied in England only) came into effect at 12.01 am on 18 July 2020.

=== Directions by local authorities ===
The regulations empowered any local authority to make directions relating to premises, events and outdoor public spaces in its area where it considersed such a direction necessary to prevent the spread of coronavirus. Any such direction had to be notified to the Secretary of State and reviewed every seven days. The Secretary of State was also given the power to force a local authority to make such a declaration.

==== Individual premises ====
A local authority could direct the owner or occupier of specific premises to close or restrict access to those premises; or to control the location of persons on the premises. No direction could be made in relation to any essential infrastructure, public transport or haulage vehicles.

==== Events ====
A local authority could issue a direction in connection with a specific event, or in connection with events of a specified description. Such a direction could impose prohibitions or restrictions on the owner or occupier of the event premises, on the event organiser, or on any other person involved in holding the event.

==== Public outdoor places ====
A local authority could issue a direction in connection with a specific public outdoor place, or in connection with places of a specified description. Once such a declaration was made, access restrictions were required to be enforced both by the owner or occupier of the land and by the local authority itself. It was a criminal offence for anyone not authorised by the declaration (apart from the owner or occupier) to enter the land without reasonable excuse.

=== Offences and enforcement ===
Local authority officers had the power to enforce their directions, and could issue prohibition notices to anyone contravening a direction. Police officers had the additional authority to close down events, to direct persons to leave a place they were not permitted to be and to remove them by force if necessary.

It was a criminal offence to breach any direction under these regulations, or without reasonable excuse to enter a public space that had been declared closed. Fixed penalty notices could be issued, or offenders prosecuted.

=== Intended expiry, and revocation ===
The regulations were originally set to expire at the end of 17 January 2021 but there were several extensions: to 18 July 2021, to 27 September 2021, and to 24 March 2022. They were ultimately revoked in their entirety on 24 February 2022.

== See also ==
- Health Protection (Coronavirus, Restrictions) (England) Regulations 2020 (the 'Lockdown Regulations')
- Coronavirus Act 2020
- Health Protection (Coronavirus) Regulations 2020
- List of statutory instruments of the United Kingdom, 2020

== Bibliography ==
- "SI 684". Legislation.gov.uk. 4 July 2020. The Health Protection (Coronavirus, Restrictions) (No. 2) (England) Regulations 2020.
- "SI 750". Legislation.gov.uk. 18 July 2020. The Health Protection (Coronavirus, Restrictions) (England) (No. 3) Regulations 2020.
- "SI 8". Legislation.gov.uk. 6 January 2021. The Health Protection (Coronavirus, Restrictions) (No. 3) and (All Tiers) (England) (Amendment) Regulations 2021.
- "SI 848". Legislation.gov.uk. 16 July 2021. The Health Protection (Coronavirus, Restrictions) (Steps etc.) (England) (Revocation and Amendment) Regulations 2021.
- "SI 1073". Legislation.gov.uk. 27 September 2021. The Health Protection (Coronavirus, Restrictions) (Self-Isolation) (England) (Amendment) (No. 3) Regulations 2021.
- "SI 161". Legislation.gov.uk. 24 February 2022. The Health Protection (Coronavirus, Restrictions) (Self-Isolation etc.) (Revocation) (England) Regulations 2022.
