= First COVID-19 tier regulations in England =

United Kingdom emergency legislation

England COVID-19 alert levels by district (as of 31 October 2020) Tier 1 (Medium) Tier 2 (High) Tier 3 (Very High)

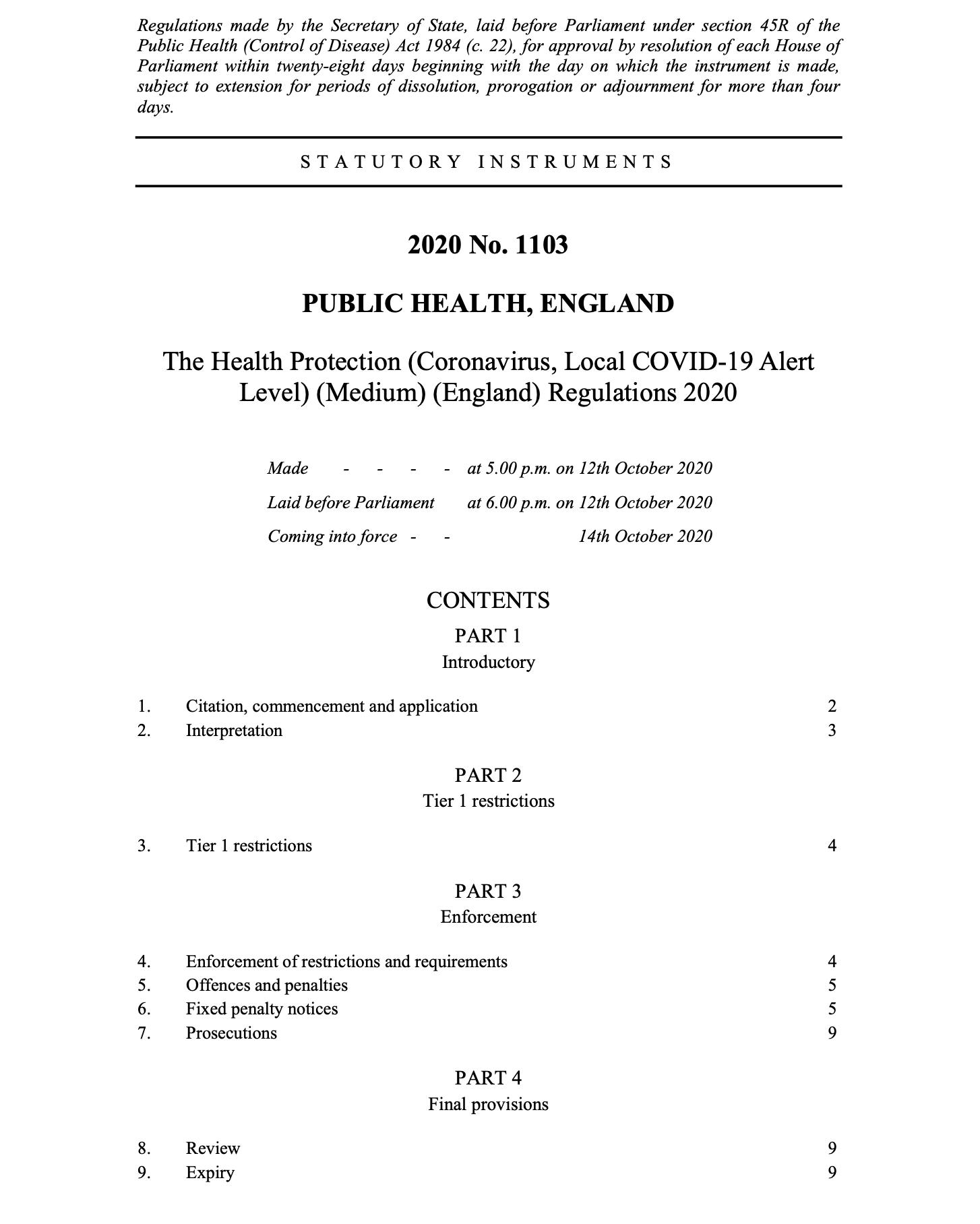
Front page of the tier 1 regulations, SI 2020/1103

On 14 October 2020, the UK Government abandoned its attempts to control the spread of SARS-CoV-2 by means of piecemeal local regulations and introduced a three-tier approach across England, with legal restrictions varying according to government-defined tiers (referred to in government statements as "Local COVID Alert Levels"). Tier 1 restrictions were referred to as 'Local COVID Alert Level Medium', with tier 2 being 'Local COVID Alert Level High' and tier 3 'Local COVID Alert Level Very High'. The restrictions were enforced by three English statutory instruments:

- "Tier 1": The Health Protection (Coronavirus, Local COVID-19 Alert Level) (Medium) (England) Regulations 2020 (SI 2020/1103)
- "Tier 2": The Health Protection (Coronavirus, Local COVID-19 Alert Level) (High) (England) Regulations 2020 (SI 2020/1104)
- "Tier 3": The Health Protection (Coronavirus, Local COVID-19 Alert Level) (Very High) (England) Regulations 2020 (SI 2020/1105)

These are collectively referred to in this article as the "tier regulations".

On 5 November 2020 the tier regulations were revoked and were replaced by the Health Protection (Coronavirus, Restrictions) (England) (No. 4) Regulations 2020 (SI 2020/1200) which enforced a more rigorous second national lockdown.

== Context and earlier regulations ==
In response to the developing COVID-19 pandemic the UK government issued advice to English schools on 12 March 2020 that they should cancel trips abroad, and on 16 March that the public should avoid non-essential travel, crowded places, and visits to care homes. This was followed by the closure of schools, colleges and nurseries from 21 March.

On 21 March, the government used emergency powers to make business closure regulations, enforcing the closure in England of businesses selling food and drink for consumption on the premises, as well as a range of other businesses such as nightclubs and indoor leisure centres where a high risk of infection could be expected. Five days later the restrictions were made more extensive. On 26 March 2020, the even more stringent Lockdown Regulations came into force. These became the principal delegated English legislation restricting freedom of movement, gatherings, and mandating business closures, and were progressively relaxed on 22 April, 13 May, 1 June, and 13/15 June. The No. 2 regulations of 4 July 2020 further relaxed the rules throughout most of England, apart from the City of Leicester and the surrounding area which became the subject of the first of a series of local regulations.

Between July and September 2020, more extensive and increasingly rigorous ad hoc local regulations were introduced, which in many areas proved unsuccessful in controlling the spread of the virus. All of these local regulations were swept away on 14 October 2020, and were replaced by the tier regulations.

== Legal basis for the tier regulations ==
The tier regulations were introduced by way of Statutory Instruments made by the Secretary of State for Health and Social Care, Matt Hancock, using emergency powers under the Public Health (Control of Disease) Act 1984, the stated legal basis being "the serious and imminent threat to public health which is posed by the incidence and spread of severe acute respiratory syndrome coronavirus 2 (SARS-CoV-2) in England". In each case, the Secretary of State used section 45R of the Public Health (Control of Disease) Act 1984 to enact the regulations without prior parliamentary consideration, subject to retrospective approval by resolution of each House of Parliament within twenty-eight days.

Each of the three regulations was made on 12 October and came into force on 14 October 2020.

== Tiered restrictions ==
Government posters, October 2020

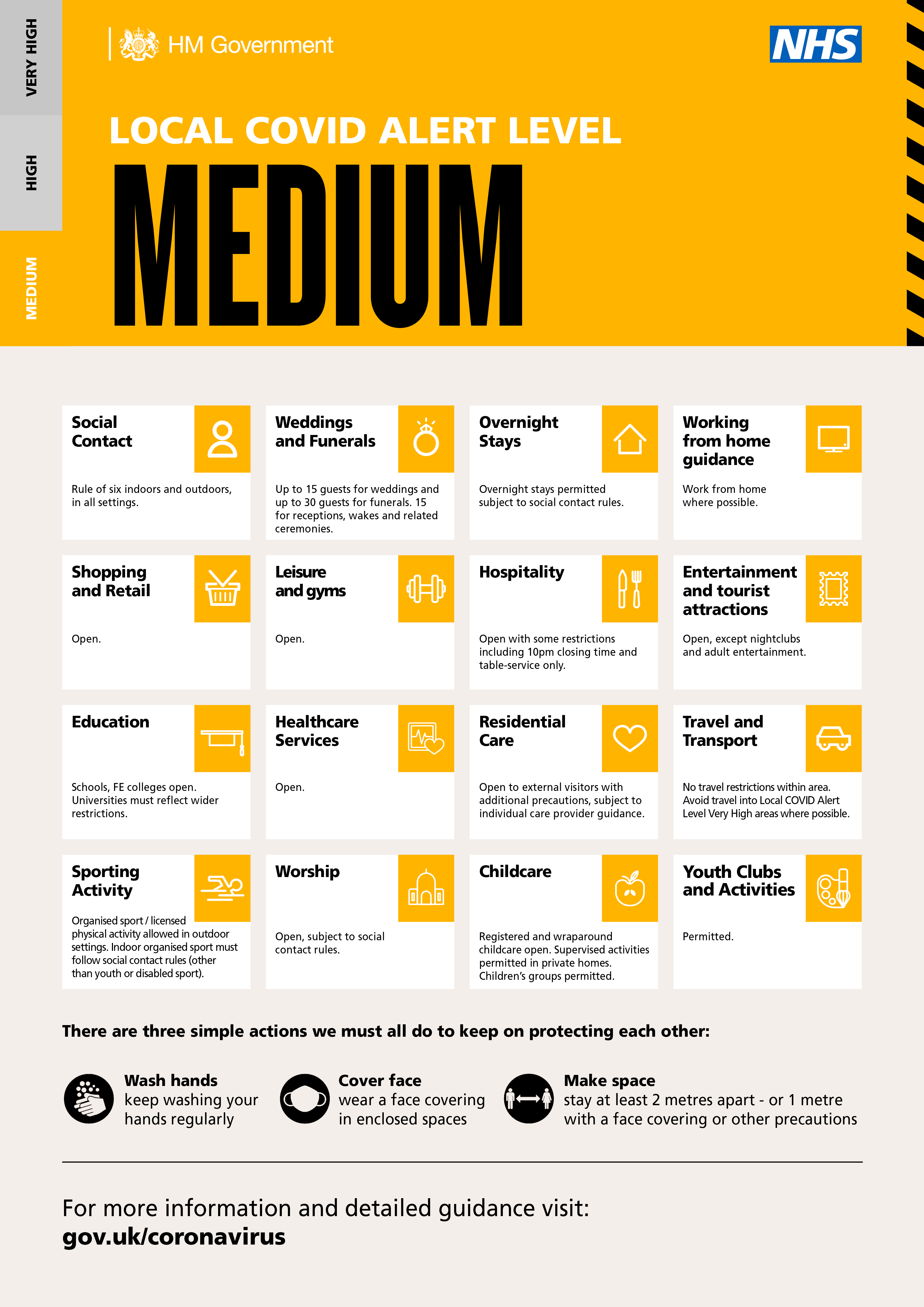
Tier 1 (Medium)

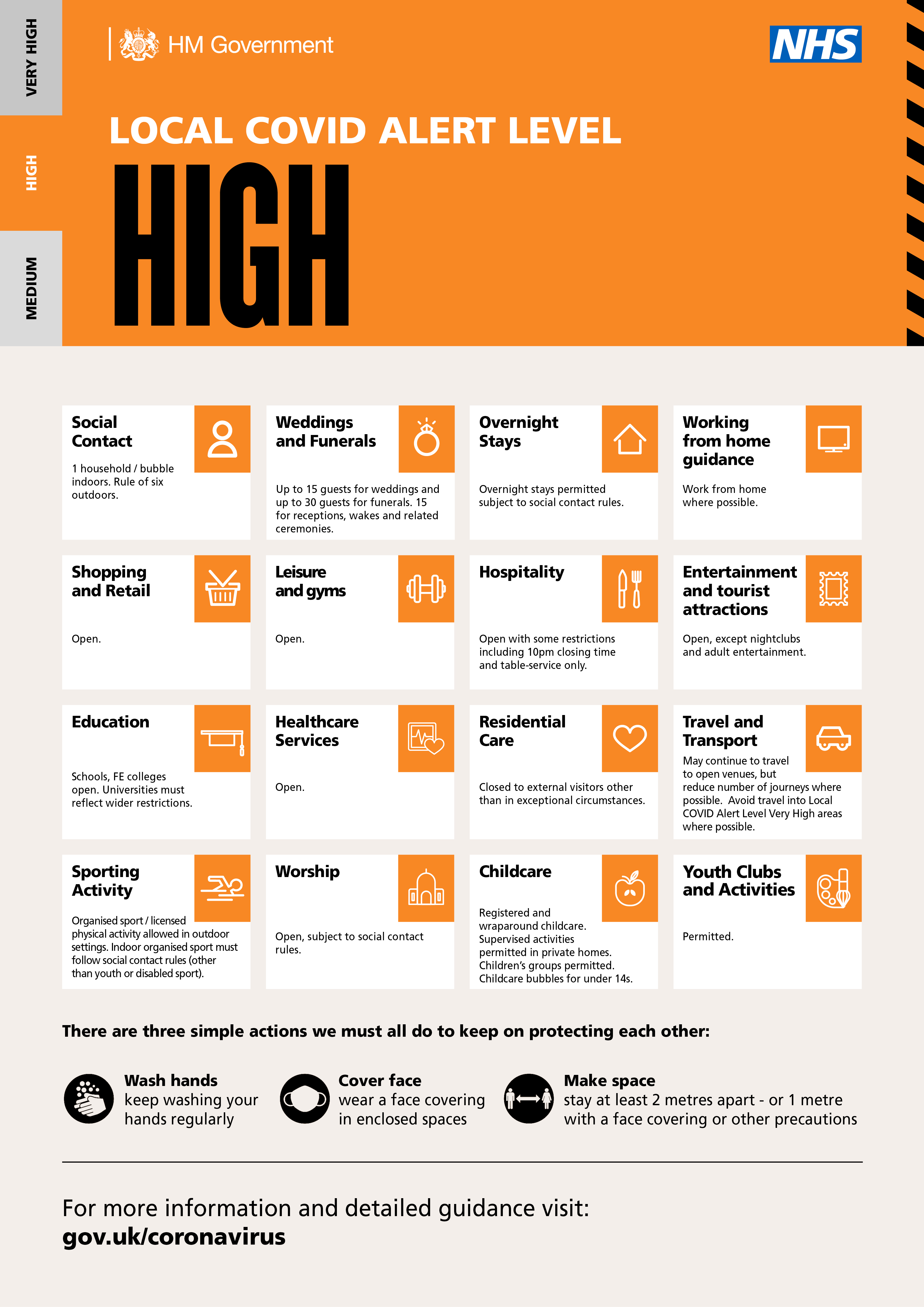
Tier 2 (High)

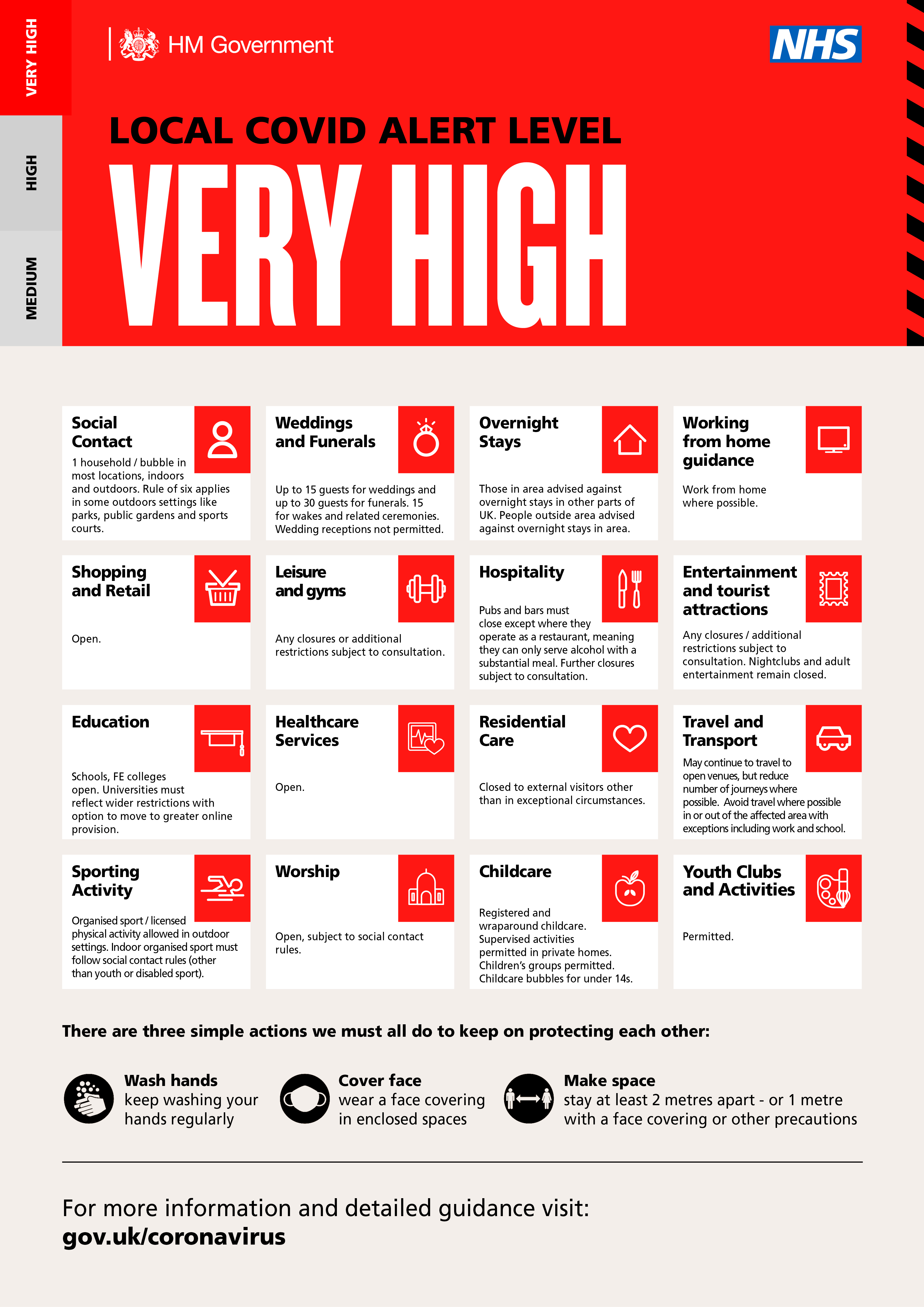
Tier 3 (Very High)

The concept of standardised Local COVID Alert Levels – medium, high and very high – was introduced by these regulations on 14 October 2020. The levels were referred to in government statements as Tier 1, 2 and 3 respectively.

Only three days later, piecemeal local changes were re-introduced at the tier 3 level, with additional local restrictions applying only in Liverpool, and different local restrictions applying only in Lancashire.

== Areas within each tier as at date of revocation ==
As at 5 November 2020, when the regulations were revoked by The Health Protection (Coronavirus, Restrictions) (England) (No. 4) Regulations 2020 the following areas fell into each Local COVID Alert Level. See Main changes by date for a list of earlier amendments.

Areas by tier
	In effect	Area	Ref
Tier 1 Local COVID Alert Level - Medium	October 14, 2020	All of England, apart from the areas in tiers 2 and 3	
Tier 2 Local COVID Alert Level - High	October 14, 2020	Cheshire: Cheshire East, Cheshire West, Chester. Derbyshire: parts of High Peak. Durham: Durham. Greater Manchester: Bolton, Bury, Manchester, Oldham, Rochdale, Salford, Stockport, Tameside, Trafford, Wigan. Leicestershire: Leicester, Oadby and Wigston. Northumberland: Northumberland. South Yorkshire: Barnsley, Doncaster, Rotherham, Sheffield. Tees Valley: Darlington, Hartlepool, Middlesbrough, Redcar and Cleveland, Stockton-on-Tees. Tyne and Wear: Gateshead, Newcastle, North Tyneside, South Tyneside, Sunderland. West Midlands: Birmingham, Sandwell, Solihull, Wolverhampton, Walsall. West Yorkshire: Bradford, Calderdale, Kirklees, Leeds, Wakefield	
Tier 2 Local COVID Alert Level - High	October 17, 2020	Cumbria: Barrow-in-Furness. Derbyshire: Chesterfield, Erewash, North East Derbyshire. Essex: Basildon, Braintree, Brentwood, Castle Point, Chelmsford, Colchester, Epping Forest, Harlow, Maldon, Rochford, Tendring, Uttlesford. Greater London: City of London, Barking and Dagenham, Barnet, Bexley, Brent, Bromley, Camden, Croydon, Ealing, Enfield, Greenwich, Hackney, Hammersmith and Fulham, Haringey, Harrow, Havering, Hillingdon, Hounslow, Islington, Kensington and Chelsea, Kingston upon Thames, Lambeth, Lewisham, Merton, Newham, Redbridge, Richmond upon Thames, Southwark, Sutton, Tower Hamlets, Waltham Forest, Wandsworth, Westminster. North Yorkshire: York. Surrey: Elmbridge	
Tier 2 Local COVID Alert Level - High	October 24, 2020	Berkshire: Slough, Staffordshire: Stoke-on-Trent, West Midlands: Coventry	
Tier 2 Local COVID Alert Level - High	October 31, 2020	Bedfordshire: Luton. Derbyshire: Amber Valley, Bolsover, Derby, Derbyshire Dales, High Peak (all areas), South Derbyshire. East Riding of Yorkshire: East Riding, Hull. Shropshire: Telford & Wrekin. Leicestershire: Charnwood. Lincolnshire: NE Lincs, N Lincs. Oxfordshire: Oxford. Staffordshire: East Staffordshire, Lichfield, Newcastle-under-Lyme, South Staffordshire, Stafford, Stafford Moorlands, Tamworth, West Midlands: Dudley	
Tier 2 Local COVID Alert Level - High	October 31, 2020	Carlisle	
Tier 3 * Local COVID Alert Level - Very High	October 17, 2020 (originally October 14, 2020)	Liverpool region: Halton, Knowsley, Liverpool, Sefton, St Helens, Wirral	
Tier 3 * Local COVID Alert Level - Very High	October 17, 2020	Lancashire: Blackpool, Blackburn with Darwen, Burnley, Chorley, Fylde, Hyndburn, Lancaster City Council, Pendle, Preston, Ribble Valley, Rossendale, South Ribble, West Lancashire, Wyre	
Tier 3 * Local COVID Alert Level - Very High	October 23, 2020	Greater Manchester: Bolton, Bury, Manchester, Oldham, Rochdale, Salford, Stockport, Tameside, Trafford, Wigan	
Tier 3 * Local COVID Alert Level - Very High	October 24, 2020	South Yorkshire: Barnsley, Doncaster, Rotherham, Sheffield	
Tier 3 * Local COVID Alert Level - Very High	October 27, 2020	Cheshire: Warrington	
Tier 3 * Local COVID Alert Level - Very High	October 30, 2020	Nottinghamshire: Ashfield, Bassetlaw, Broxtowe, Gedling, Mansfield, Newark & Sherwood, Nottingham, Rushcliffe	

* Tier 3 areas were intended to expire automatically after 28 days.

== Restrictions on gatherings ==
In all tiers, gatherings were restricted. In the spaces indicated, these were the only permitted gatherings, unless one of the exceptions applied.

Permitted gatherings
Space	Tier 1	Tier 2	Tier 3
Private dwelling (indoors)	Up to 6	None permitted	None permitted
Other private indoor space	Up to 6	None permitted	None permitted
Private dwelling (outdoors, e.g. garden)	Up to 6	Up to 6	None permitted
Private outdoor space	Up to 6	Up to 6	None permitted
Public outdoor space	Up to 6	Up to 6	Up to 6*

* Meetings of up to 6 were permitted only in free-to-access public outdoor areas, and pay-to-access public outdoor sports grounds and facilities, botanical gardens and the gardens of castles, stately homes and historic houses(but not fairgrounds or funfairs). No gatherings were permitted in any other outdoor area.

== Exceptions to restrictions on gatherings ==
There were a variety of permitted exceptions to the above prohibitions, with details varying according to tier.

=== Tier 1 exceptions ===
Tier 1 exceptions
Type	Indoor and outdoor exceptions	Ref
Same or linked households	All required to be members of a common household, or of two linked households ("support bubble")	
Permitted organised gatherings	Organised, with precautions, by a business, charity or public body after a risk assessment. Participants must attend either alone or as part of a sub-group of no more than 6 (apart from larger single or linked household groups). Not allowed at a private dwelling	
Gatherings necessary for certain purposes	Work, voluntary services, education, registered childcare, supervised activities for children, emergency assistance, avoiding harm, providing care to a vulnerable person, child access to parents, contact between certain siblings, prospective adopters	
Legal obligations and proceedings	Fulfilling a legal obligation or participating in legal proceedings	
Criminal justice accommodation	Any gathering in criminal justice accommodation	
Support groups	Formally organised support groups of no more than 15 people. Not allowed at a private dwelling	
Births	Attending a person giving birth	
Marriages and civil partnerships etc.	No more than 15 people. Organised, with precautions, after a risk assessment. Includes non-faith ceremonies, but not at a private dwelling	
Wedding and civil partnership receptions	No more than 15 people. Organised, with precautions, after a risk assessment. Not allowed at a private dwelling	
Funerals	No more than 30 people. Organised, with precautions, after a risk assessment. Must be in a public outdoor space or a business or charity premises. Not allowed at a private dwelling	
Commemorative event following a person's death	No more than 15 people. Organised, with precautions, after a risk assessment. Not allowed at a private dwelling	
Protests	Organised, with precautions, by a business, charity, public body or political body after a risk assessment	
Elite sports	Training and competition for elite sportspersons and coaches	
Other sports	Organised outdoor sports or fitness activities, with precautions, after a risk assessment. Indoor activities for disabled people	
Outdoor activities	An outdoor physical activity for which a licence or permit issued by a public body (other than a driving licence or a food or alcohol licence) is required	
Remembrance Sunday	Commemorations where spectators participate either alone or as part of a sub-group of no more than 6 (apart from larger single or linked household groups). Provisions also for attendees who are working, members of the armed or voluntary services, and veterans	

=== Tier 2 exceptions ===
Tier 2 exceptions
Type	Indoor exceptions	Ref	Outdoor exceptions	Ref
Same or linked households	All required to be members of a common household, or of two linked households ("support bubble")		As indoor exceptions	
Permitted organised gatherings	Organised, with precautions, by a business, charity or public body after a risk assessment. Participants must attend either alone or as part of a sub-group of no more than 6 (apart from larger single or linked household groups). Not allowed at a private dwelling		As indoor exceptions	
Gatherings necessary for certain purposes	To facilitate a house move; or as outdoor exceptions		Work, voluntary services, education, registered childcare, supervised activities for children, emergency assistance, avoiding harm, providing care to a vulnerable person, child access to parents, contact between certain siblings, prospective adopters	
Legal	Fulfilling a legal obligation or participating in legal proceedings		Fulfilling a legal obligation	
Criminal justice accommodation	Any gathering in criminal justice accommodation		As indoor exceptions	
Support groups	Formally organised support groups of no more than 15 people. Not allowed at a private dwelling		As indoor exceptions	
Births	Attending a person giving birth		As indoor exceptions	
Marriages and civil partnerships etc.	No more than 15 people. Organised, with precautions, after a risk assessment. Includes non-faith ceremonies, but not at a private dwelling		As indoor exceptions	
Wedding and civil partnership receptions	No more than 15 people. Organised, with precautions, after a risk assessment. Not allowed at a private dwelling		As indoor exceptions	
Funerals	No more than 30 people. Organised, with precautions, after a risk assessment. Must be held at a business or charity premises. Not allowed at a private dwelling		As indoor exceptions, but must be held in a public outdoor space	
Commemorative event following a person's death	No more than 15 people. Organised, with precautions, after a risk assessment. Must be held a premises, but not a private dwelling		As indoor exceptions	
Visiting a dying person	Visitor is a member of that person's household, a close family member, or a friend		N/A	
Visiting persons receiving treatment etc	Visitor is a member of that person's household, a close family member, or a friend. Applies to hospitals, hospices and care homes		N/A	
Protests	Organised, with precautions, by a business, charity, public body or political body after a risk assessment		As indoor exceptions	
Elite sports	Training and competition for elite sportspersons and coaches		As indoor exceptions	
Other sports	Indoor activities for disabled people only		Organised outdoor sports or fitness activities, with precautions, after a risk assessment	
Outdoor activities	N/A		An outdoor physical activity for which a licence or permit issued by a public body (other than a driving licence or a food or alcohol licence) is required	
Remembrance Sunday	Commemorations where spectators participate either alone or as part of a sub-group of no more than 6 (apart from larger single or linked household groups). Provisions also for attendees who are working, members of the armed or voluntary services, and veterans		As indoor exceptions	

=== Tier 3 exceptions ===
Tier 3 exceptions
Type	Indoor and outdoor exceptions			Ref
Same or linked households	All required to be members of a common household, or of two linked households ("support bubble")			
Permitted organised gatherings	Organised, with precautions, by a business, charity or public body after a risk assessment. Participants must attend either alone or as part of a sub-group of no more than 6 (apart from larger single or linked household groups). Not allowed at a private dwelling			
Gatherings necessary for certain purposes	Work, voluntary services, education, registered childcare, supervised activities for children, emergency assistance, avoiding harm, providing care to a vulnerable person, child access to parents, contact between certain siblings, prospective adopters, to facilitate a house move			
Legal obligations and proceedings	Fulfilling a legal obligation or participating in legal proceedings			
Criminal justice accommodation	Any gathering in criminal justice accommodation			
Support groups	Formally organised support groups of no more than 15 people. Not allowed at a private dwelling			
Births	Attending a person giving birth			
Marriages and civil partnerships etc.	No more than 15 people. Organised, with precautions, after a risk assessment. Includes non-faith ceremonies, but not at a private dwelling			
Funerals	No more than 30 people. Organised, with precautions, after a risk assessment. Must be held at a business or charity premises. Not allowed at a private dwelling			
Commemorative event following a person's death	No more than 15 people. Organised, with precautions, after a risk assessment. Must be held a premises, but not a private dwelling			
Protests	Organised, with precautions, by a business, charity, public body or political body after a risk assessment			
Elite sports	Training and competition for elite sportspersons and coaches			
Remembrance Sunday	Commemorations where spectators participate either alone or as part of a sub-group of no more than 6 (apart from larger single or linked household groups). Provisions also for attendees who are working, members of the armed or voluntary services, and veterans			
Type	Indoor exceptions	Ref	Outdoor exceptions	Ref
Visiting a dying person	Visitor is a member of that person's household, a close family member, or a friend		N/A	
Visiting persons receiving treatment etc.	Visitor is a member of that person's household, a close family member, or a friend. Applied to hospitals, hospices and care homes		N/A	
Informal childcare	Childcare provided by a member of a linked household		N/A	
Other sports	Indoor activities for disabled people only		Organised outdoor sports or fitness activities, with precautions, after a risk assessment	
Outdoor activities	N/A		An outdoor physical activity for which a licence or permit issued by a public body (other than a driving licence or a food or alcohol licence) is required	

There were no exceptions in tier 3 for wedding and civil partnership receptions.

== Linked households ==
A household containing exactly one adult (no more) and any number of children could form a permanent link with one other household of any size (such linked households were referred to in government statements as "support bubbles"). Households which were already linked under earlier regulations could not link with any other household.

== Business closures and restrictions ==
All the tiers were subject to business closures and restrictions on trading.

=== Tier 1 business restrictions ===
Tier 1 closures and restrictions
	Details	Ref	Exceptions	Ref
Businesses that must close	Nightclubs, dance halls, discos, sexual entertainment venues, hostess bars, any venue with music and dancing that opens at night		Where the owner runs a separate shop, cafe or restaurant, or an online delivery service	
Opening hours restrictions	Must close between 22:00 and 05:00: restaurants*, food and drink takeaways*, cafes and workplace canteens*, bars*, pubs*, social clubs*, casinos*, bowling alleys, cinemas, theatres, amusement arcades or other indoor leisure centres, funfairs (indoors or outdoors), theme and adventure parks and activities, bingo halls, and concert halls		Supermarkets, convenience stores, pharmacists, petrol stations; motorway service stations); air and sea ports; on public transport; online food and drink deliveries and collections, drive-through takeaways. Cinemas, theatres and concert halls may remain open after 22:00 for the purpose of completing performances which began before that time	
Table service and customer eating	Venues marked * above selling alcohol must serve all food and drink to customers seated at tables. Customers must order at the table, and must remain seated while eating and drinking. Venues so marked which do not sell alcohol need not serve customers at a table, but they must ensure that customers eating and drinking on the premises remain seated			

=== Tier 2 business restrictions ===
As at 14 October, these were the same as tier 1.

Tier 2 closures and restrictions
	Details	Ref	Exceptions	Ref
Businesses that must close	Nightclubs, dance halls, discos, sexual entertainment venues, hostess bars, any venue with music and dancing that opens at night		Where the owner runs a separate shop, cafe or restaurant, or an online delivery service	
Opening hours restrictions	Must close between 22:00 and 05:00: restaurants*, food and drink takeaways*, cafes and workplace canteens*, bars*, pubs*, social clubs*, casinos*, bowling alleys, cinemas, theatres, amusement arcades or other indoor leisure centres, funfairs (indoors or outdoors), theme and adventure parks and activities, bingo halls, and concert halls		Supermarkets, convenience stores, pharmacists, petrol stations; motorway service stations); air and sea ports; on public transport; online food and drink deliveries and collections, drive-through takeaways. Cinemas, theatres and concert halls may remain open after 22:00 for the purpose of completing performances which began before that time	
Table service and customer eating	Venues marked * above which sell alcohol must serve all food and drink to customers seated at tables. Customers must order at the table, and must remain seated while eating and drinking. Venues so marked which do not sell alcohol need not serve customers at a table, but they must ensure that customers eating and drinking on the premises remain seated			

=== Tier 3 base-level business restrictions ===
Major differences from the tier 2 restrictions are shown in italic.

Tier 3 base-level closures and restrictions
	Details	Ref	Exceptions	Ref
Businesses that must close	Nightclubs, dance halls, discos, sexual entertainment venues, hostess bars, any venue with music and dancing that opens at night		Where the owner runs a separate shop, cafe or restaurant, or an online delivery service	
Restrictions on pubs, bars, and other venues selling alcohol for consumption on the premises	These venues must close unless they serve alcohol only as part of a main meal (at least equivalent to the main course of a main midday or evening meal). The meal must be eaten while seated at a table (not at a serving counter). This rule applies equally to areas adjacent to the premises used by customers		Alcohol served as part of a hotel's room service	
Opening hours restrictions	Must close between 22:00 and 05:00: restaurants*, food and drink takeaways*, cafes and workplace canteens*, bars*, pubs*, social clubs*, bowling alleys, cinemas, theatres, amusement arcades or other indoor leisure centres, funfairs (indoors or outdoors), theme and adventure parks and activities, bingo halls, and concert halls		Supermarkets, convenience stores, pharmacists, petrol stations; motorway service stations); air and sea ports; on public transport; online food and drink deliveries and collections, drive-through takeaways. Cinemas, theatres and concert halls may remain open after 22:00 for the purpose of completing performances which began before that time	
Table service and customer eating	Venues marked * above which sell alcohol must serve all food and drink to customers seated at tables. Customers must order at the table, and must remain seated while eating and drinking. Venues so marked which do not sell alcohol need not serve customers at a table, but they must ensure that customers eating and drinking on the premises remain seated			

=== Tier 3 additional restrictions in specific regions ===
These restrictions applied in the areas specified, in addition to the tier 3 base-level restrictions

	In effect	Details	Ref
Tier 3 areas within Liverpool	19 Oct 2020	Must close (or remain closed): betting shops and adult gaming centres, casinos, indoor gyms, fitness and dance studios, and indoor sports facilities	
Tier 3 areas within Liverpool	24 Oct 2020	Must close: soft play areas	
Tier 3 areas within Lancashire	19 Oct 2020	Must close (or remain closed): betting shops and adult gaming centres, casinos, bingo halls, soft play areas, car boot sales	
Tier 3 areas within Greater Manchester	23 Oct 2020	Must close: betting shops and adult gaming centres, casinos, bingo halls, soft play areas	
Tier 3 areas within South Yorkshire	23 Oct 2020	Must close: betting shops and adult gaming centres, casinos, soft play areas	
Tier 3 areas within Cheshire	27 Oct 2020	Must close: betting shops and adult gaming centres, casinos, soft play areas	
Tier 3 areas within Nottinghamshire	30 Oct 2020	Must close: restaurants, cafes (except for the serving of a substantial table meal, without alcohol); betting shops and adult gaming centres, casinos, bingo halls, car boot sales, most auction houses; theme parks, circuses, funfairs, fairgrounds; spas and beauty salons (other than hairdressers), nail bars, tanning salons, tattoo and piercing parlours, saunas; most conference centres and exhibition halls, museums and galleries; many indoor entertainment venues including: visitor attractions, amusement arcades, bowling alleys, play centres and soft play areas, roller-skating rinks, indoor games, recreation and entertainment venues (such as laser quests and escape rooms); hookah lounges. Off-licences must close between 9 pm and 5 am	

== Requirement to obtain contact details ==
The tier 1 regulations added cinemas, concert venues and theatres to the existing requirement for venue operators to obtain contact details (name and phone number) from people or groups entering the venue.

== Enforcement ==
Breaches of the regulations were offences and could be prosecuted or dealt with by fixed penalty notices with penalties ranging up to £10,000 for repeated violations.

== Reviews and revocation ==
The Secretary of State had to review the need for all the restrictions every 28 days, and also the applicability of the tier 2 geographical areas every 14 days. There was no separate review of the tier 1 geographical areas. Tier 3 geographical area designations were set to expire automatically after 28 days.

All of the tier regulations were set to expire automatically on 14 April 2021. In the event, however, they were all revoked early, on 5 November 2020, by the Health Protection (Coronavirus, Restrictions) (England) (No. 4) Regulations 2020 which enforced a more rigorous second lockdown.

== Main changes by date ==
This chronological table lists the main changes made by amendments to the tier regulations.

SI	In effect	Ref	Main changes
2020/1128	17 Oct 2020		Move up to tier 2: Greater London and the City of London, Essex (apart from Southend-on-Sea and Thurrock), Derbyshire (parts of High Peak), Cumbria (Barrow-in-Furness), North Yorkshire (York) and Surrey (Elmbridge)
2020/1131	17 Oct 2020		Move up to tier 3: Lancashire
2020/1131	19 Oct 2020		Allow the re-opening of casinos, betting shops, indoor gyms, fitness and dance studios and indoor sports facilities, except in Liverpool and Lancashire where special rules applied
2020/1154	23 Oct 2020		Move up to tier 3: Greater Manchester. Additional closures in that area, beyond base tier 3 closures
2020/1154	24 Oct 2020		Move up to tier 2 Slough, Stoke-on-Trent and Coventry Move up to tier 3: South Yorkshire. Additional closures in that area, beyond base tier 3 closures. Close soft play areas in Liverpool.
2020/1176	27 Oct 2020		Move up to tier 3: Cheshire: Warrington
2020/1183	30 Oct 2020		Move up to tier 3: Nottinghamshire.
2020/1183	30 Oct 2020		Many more business closures in Nottinghamshire; off-licences must close at 9 pm
2020/1189	31 Oct 2020		Move up to tier 2: Bedfordshire: Luton. Derbyshire: Amber Valley, Bolsover, Derby, Derbyshire Dales, remaining areas of High Peak, South Derbyshire. East Riding of Yorkshire: East Riding, Hull. Shropshire: Telford & Wrekin. Leicestershire: Charnwood. Lincolnshire: NE Lincs, N Lincs. Oxfordshire: Oxford. Staffordshire: East Staffordshire, Lichfield, Newcastle-under-Lyme, South Staffordshire, Stafford, Stafford Moorlands, Tamworth, West Midlands: Dudley
2020/1192	31 Oct 2020		Move up to tier 2: Carlisle

== Bibliography ==
- "SI 350". Legislation.gov.uk. 26 March 2020. The Health Protection (Coronavirus, Restrictions) (England) Regulations 2020.
- "SI 684". Legislation.gov.uk. 4 July 2020. The Health Protection (Coronavirus, Restrictions) (England) (No. 2) Regulations 2020.
- "SI 685". Legislation.gov.uk. 4 July 2020. The Health Protection (Coronavirus, Restrictions) (Leicester) Regulations 2020.
- "SI 1103". Legislation.gov.uk. 14 October 2020. The Health Protection (Coronavirus, Local COVID-19 Alert Level) (Medium) (England) Regulations 2020.
- "SI 1104". Legislation.gov.uk. 14 October 2020. The Health Protection (Coronavirus, Local COVID-19 Alert Level) (High) (England) Regulations 2020.
- "SI 1105". Legislation.gov.uk. 14 October 2020. The Health Protection (Coronavirus, Local COVID-19 Alert Level) (Very High) (England) Regulations 2020.
- "SI 1128". Legislation.gov.uk. 17 October 2020. The Health Protection (Coronavirus, Local COVID-19 Alert Level) ( High) (England) (Amendment) Regulations 2020.
- "SI 1131". Legislation.gov.uk. 17 October 2020. The Health Protection (Coronavirus, Local COVID-19 Alert Level) ( Very High) (England) (Amendment) Regulations 2020.
- "SI 1154". Legislation.gov.uk. 22 October 2020. The Health Protection (Coronavirus, Local COVID-19 Alert Level) (Medium, High and Very High) (England) (Amendment) Regulations 2020.
- "SI 1176". Legislation.gov.uk. 27 October 2020. The Health Protection (Coronavirus, Local COVID-19 Alert Level) (Medium, High and Very High) (England) (Amendment) (No. 2) Regulations 2020.
- "SI 1183". Legislation.gov.uk. 30 October 2020. The Health Protection (Coronavirus, Local COVID-19 Alert Level) (Medium, High and Very High) (England) (Amendment) (No. 3) Regulations 2020.
- "SI 1189". Legislation.gov.uk. 31 October 2020. The Health Protection (Coronavirus, Local COVID-19 Alert Level) (High) (England) (Amendment) (No. 2) Regulations 2020.
- "SI 1192". Legislation.gov.uk. 31 October 2020. The Health Protection (Coronavirus, Local COVID-19 Alert Level) (High) (England) (Amendment) (No. 3) Regulations 2020.
