= Health Protection (Coronavirus, Restrictions) (Self-Isolation) (England) Regulations 2020 =

United Kingdom emergency legislation

- Statutory Instrument
- Parliament of the United Kingdom
- Citation: SI 2020/1045
- Introduced by: Matt Hancock, Secretary of State for Health and Social Care
- Territorial extent: England

Dates
- Made: 27 September 2020
- Laid before Parliament: 28 September 2020
- Commencement: 28 September 2020
- Revoked: 24 February 2022

Other legislation
- Made under: Public Health (Control of Disease) Act 1984
- Revoked by: Health Protection (Coronavirus, Restrictions) (Self-Isolation etc.) (Revocation) (England) Regulations 2022

Status: Revoked

Text of the Health Protection (Coronavirus, Restrictions) (Self-Isolation) (England) Regulations 2020 as in force today (including any amendments) within the United Kingdom, from legislation.gov.uk.

The Health Protection (Coronavirus, Restrictions) (Self-Isolation) (England) Regulations 2020 (SI 2020/1045) is a statutory instrument (SI) made on 27 September 2020 by the Secretary of State for Health and Social Care, Matt Hancock, in response to the COVID-19 pandemic. They are sometimes referred to as the Self-Isolation Regulations.

The regulations, which covered England only, mandated self-isolation for up to 14 days (reduced to 10 days on 14 December 2020) for anyone testing positive, or who was living with or who had otherwise been in close contact with someone who had tested positive. A person required to self-isolate had to state the address at which they would be self-isolating, and was required disclose to the contacting official the names of all the people they lived with. The isolating person's employer was required not to allow them to attend work. Breaches of the regulations could lead to criminal prosecutions or fixed penalties on sliding scales of up to £10,000.

From 16 August 2021 certain classes of people were exempted from having to self-isolate, including those having received a full course of vaccination in the UK. That exemption was removed following the initial emergence of the Omicron variant, but was restored on 14 December 2021.

The regulations were revoked on 24 February 2022.

== Regulations ==
=== Legal basis ===
The Health Protection (Coronavirus, Restrictions) (Self-Isolation) (England) Regulations 2020 (SI 2020/1045) were introduced by way of a statutory instrument made by the Secretary of State for Health and Social Care, Matt Hancock, using emergency powers available to him under the Public Health (Control of Disease) Act 1984. The regulations themselves stated the legal basis for using such powers, namely "the serious and imminent threat to public health which is posed by the incidence and spread of severe acute respiratory syndrome coronavirus 2 (SARS-CoV-2) in England"; he also certified that the restrictions "are proportionate to what they seek to achieve, which is a public health response to that threat."

The regulations were laid before Parliament at 00.00 on 28 September, just as the regulations were coming into force. The Secretary of State used section 45R of the Public Health (Control of Disease) Act 1984 to enact the regulations immediately subject to retrospective approval by resolution of each House of Parliament within twenty-eight days. In the regulations themselves he stated that "by reason of urgency, it is necessary to make this instrument" without having first placed a draft before parliament for prior discussion and approval.

=== Commencement ===
The regulations (which applied in England only) came into effect at 00.00 am on 28 September 2020.

=== Requirement to provide information and to self-isolate ===
Anyone (unless they qualified as exempt) who received official notification that they had tested positive for SARS-CoV-2, or that they had come into close contact with someone who has tested positive, had to self-isolate for the period described below. The official notification had to come from a health official, the local authority, or someone acting on behalf of the secretary of state; notification via the NHS COVID-19 smartphone app did not count.

In this context, 'close contact' meant having face-to-face contact with someone at a distance of less than 1 metre, spending more than 15 minutes within 2 metres, travelling in a car or other small vehicle, or being in close proximity on an aeroplane.

The person being notified had on request to inform the official of the address at which they intend to self-isolate and if applicable had to disclose the names of everyone who lived in their household.

=== Exemptions ===
==== From 16 August 2021 to 30 November 2021 ====
From 16 August 2021 certain classes of people were exempted from having to self-isolate if they were a 'close contact', namely:

- a person who had received a complete course of vaccination in the UK, provided that the contact took place more than 14 days after completion of the course,
- a person who had taken part in a vaccine trial,
- a person who could provide evidence that for clinical reasons they should not be vaccinated, and
- a child.

These exemptions did not apply to anyone who had tested positive.

==== From 9 December 2021 to 23 February 2022 (revocation) ====
From 9 December 2021 (under SI 2021/1382), a person who had received a complete course of vaccination overseas, or one dose overseas and another in the UK, became exempt in the same way as someone vaccinated in the UK.

(SI 2021/1382 was, due to an oversight, not ratified by Parliament within the required 28 days, and automatically lapsed on 25 January. The oversight was rectified two days later, with SI 2022/72 replicating the previous amendment with effect from 27 January and providing a further 28 days for ratification).

==== Omicron variant rule, 30 November to 14 December 2021 ====
Following the initial emergence of the Omicron variant, the 16 August exemption was removed on 30 November from anyone who had been in close contact with a person having or suspected of having that variant. Anyone (including children and fully-vaccinated individuals) who had been in close contact was required to self-isolate. The rule was abolished on 14 December 2021 when the number of Omicron variant infections became too high to sustain it.

==== From 14 December 2021 to 23 February 2022 (revocation) ====
On abolition of the Omicron variant rule, the 16 August and 9 December regulations were largely restored, and there was once again no distinction between Omicron and other strains. As from 14 December 2021 the following were exempt from having to self-isolate where they were a close contact:

- a person who had received a complete course of vaccination, provided that the contact took place more than 14 days after completion of the course,
- a person who was taking part in a vaccine trial,
- a person who could provide evidence that for clinical reasons they should not be vaccinated, or
- a child.

=== Location of self isolation ===
The self-isolating person had to remain at home, at the home of a friend or family member, in B&B accommodation, or at some other suitable place. They were not permitted to leave that location unless necessary:

- to seek medical assistance urgently, or on the advice of a medical practitioner (this included mental health services and services from dentists, opticians, audiologists, chiropodists, chiropractors, osteopaths and other medical or health practitioners)
- to access veterinary services urgently, or on the advice of a vet
- to fulfil a legal obligation
- to avoid a risk of harm
- to attend a close family member's funeral
- to obtain basic necessities, such as food and medical supplies for those in the same household, where it is not possible to do so in any other manner
- to access critical public services, or
- to move to a new place of self-isolation where it becomes impracticable to remain at the current place.

The regulations were amended on 28 March 2021 to add:

- to accompany an expectant mother to a medical appointment, or to attend during the birth
- various exceptions relating to coronavirus testing and research

The regulations were amended on 19 July 2021 to add:

- to post a coronavirus test

The list of reasons was exhaustive; unlike some other regulations there was no catch-all “reasonable excuse” provision.

=== Periods of self isolation ===
- Note: the text in this section reflects the regulation as initially made. The rules defining the required period of self-isolation were amended and made significantly more complex on 29 March 2021 by The Health Protection (Coronavirus, Restrictions) (Steps) (England) Regulations 2021. Except as specifically noted, those amendments have not been summarised here.

==== Start date ====
The self-isolation period started at the moment that an official notification was received by the person who was required to self-isolate. For a child, the period started when the notification was received by a guardian or other adult currently in charge.

==== Individual tested positive ====
From 28 September 2020
People who had tested positive had to isolate for five days after the test, or 10 days after their symptoms started, whichever was the later. If the symptom start date was not known, or was not reported, they were required to isolate for 10 days from the date of the test.

From 29 March 2021
People who had tested positive had to isolate for a period of 10 days.

- Where a person did not report the date of first symptoms, the 10 days started on the day after the test
- Where a person did report the date of first symptoms, the 10 days started on the later of
  - the day after first symptoms and
  - four days before the test (in other words, isolation for 5 days from the test date where the symptoms had first developed five or more days earlier)

Where a person tested positive and was officially advised to take a further PCR test, the result of which was negative, then the requirement to self isolate ceased on the date of negative result notification.

In December 2021 it was announced that the period a person must self-isolate after testing positive could be reduced to 7 days, subject to negative results to lateral flow tests being achieved by the individual on day 6 and day 7 of the isolation period.

==== Household member tested positive ====
People notified that another member of their household had tested positive were required to isolate for nine days after that person's symptoms began. If the symptom start date was not known, or was not reported, they were required to isolate for 10 days from the date of that person's test (a period of 14 days applied until 12 December 2020).

==== Close contact tested positive ====
People notified that they had been recorded as a close contact of someone outside their household who had tested positive were required to isolate for 10 days (14 days until 12 December 2020). The period started with the last close contact they had before the notification, as specified by the official. The regulations did not make any provision for the person being notified to challenge that date: they had to isolate for the required period from whatever date the official had recorded.

=== Requirement on employers of self-isolating workers ===
Where a worker or agency worker had to isolate, their employer could not allow them to attend any workplace other than the place where they were isolating.

=== Notification by self-isolating worker ===
A worker who knew that they had to self-isolate, but who would normally be due to attend a workplace, had to notify their employer of the dates of their self-isolation. A similar rule applied to agency workers. Where applicable, the worker's employer, agent and principal had to be informed, and each of these had to inform the others.

=== Offences and enforcement ===
The regulations authorised enforcement of the self-isolation requirement by police constables and police community support officers, as well as officials nominated by the secretary of state or the local authority. All of these had the power to direct a person to return to their place of self-isolation, and could remove them to that place using force if necessary.

Failing to comply with the requirements was a criminal offence. Offenders could be prosecuted, or made subject to a range of fixed penalty charges.

Fixed penalties
Type of breach	Fixed penalty, or range	Ref
Breaking isolation, or giving false information to an official	£1000–£10,000	
Breaking isolation and recklessly coming into close contact with someone	£4000–£10,000	
Employer knowingly allows isolating worker to attend workplace	£1000–£10,000	
Worker fails to inform employer of requirement to isolate	£50	
Employer, agent or principal of an isolating agency worker fail to inform each other	£1000	

=== Power to use and disclose information ===
Information officially collected under these regulations could be disclosed to certain third parties to prevent danger to public health by the spread of coronavirus, or to carry out a function under the regulations, even where the disclosure would normally have been a breach of confidence. But no disclosure was permitted that would contravene data protection legislation.

From 29 January 2021, the rules were amended to allow Test & Trace data to be shared with the police to enforce isolation, or to pursue fixed penalty notices or prosecutions.

=== Protection against self-incrimination ===
Where a person had been instructed to self-isolate and provided an official with information about their household members, addresses, and dates, that information could not normally be used against the person in unrelated criminal proceedings (subject to some exceptions).

=== Intended expiry, and revocation ===
The Secretary of State was required to review the regulations after six months (i.e. by 28 March 2021). The regulations were originally set to expire on 27 September 2021, later extended to 24 March 2022. They were ultimately revoked in their entirety on 24 February 2022.

== See also ==
- Health Protection (Coronavirus, Restrictions) (England) Regulations 2020 (the 'Lockdown Regulations')
- Health Protection (Coronavirus, International Travel) (England) Regulations 2020
- Coronavirus Act 2020
- Health Protection (Coronavirus) Regulations 2020
- List of statutory instruments of the United Kingdom, 2020

== Bibliography ==
- "SI 1045". Legislation.gov.uk. 28 September 2020. The Health Protection (Coronavirus, Restrictions) (Self-Isolation) (England) Regulations 2020.
- "SI 1518". Legislation.gov.uk. 14 December 2020. The Health Protection (Coronavirus, Restrictions) (Self- Isolation and Linked Households) (England) Regulations 2020.
- "SI 97". Legislation.gov.uk. 29 January 2021. The Health Protection (Coronavirus, Restrictions) (All Tiers and Self-Isolation) (England) (Amendment) Regulations 2021.
- "SI 364". Legislation.gov.uk. 29 March 2021. The Health Protection (Coronavirus, Restrictions) (Steps) (England) Regulations 2021.
- "SI 851". Legislation.gov.uk. 16 August 2021. The Health Protection (Coronavirus, Restrictions) (Steps) (England) (Amendment) Regulations 2021.
- "SI 864". Legislation.gov.uk. 19 August 2021. The Health Protection (Coronavirus, Restrictions) (Self-Isolation) (England) (Amendment) (No. 2) Regulations 2021.
- "SI 1073". Legislation.gov.uk. 27 September 2021. The Health Protection (Coronavirus, Restrictions) (Self-Isolation) (England) (Amendment) (No. 3) Regulations 2021.
- "SI 1338". Legislation.gov.uk. 30 November 2021. The Health Protection (Coronavirus, Restrictions) (Self-Isolation) (England) (Amendment) (No. 4) Regulations 2021.
- "SI 1382". Legislation.gov.uk. 8 December 2021. The Health Protection (Coronavirus, Restrictions) (Self-Isolation) (England) (Amendment) (No. 5) Regulations 2021.
- "SI 1415". Legislation.gov.uk. 14 December 2021. The Health Protection (Coronavirus, Restrictions) (Self-Isolation) (England) (Amendment) (No. 6) Regulations 2021.
- "SI 72". Legislation.gov.uk. 27 January 2022. The Health Protection (Coronavirus, Restrictions) (Self-Isolation) (England) (Amendment) Regulations 2022.
- "SI 161". Legislation.gov.uk. 24 February 2022. The Health Protection (Coronavirus, Restrictions) (Self- Isolation etc.) (Revocation) (England) Regulations 2022.
