= Health Protection (Coronavirus, Business Closure) (England) Regulations 2020 =

United Kingdom emergency legislation

- Statutory Instrument
- Parliament of the United Kingdom
- Citation: SI 2020/327
- Introduced by: Matt Hancock, Secretary of State for Health and Social Care
- Territorial extent: England

Dates
- Made: 21 March 2020
- Laid before Parliament: 23 March 2020
- Commencement: 21 March 2020
- Revoked: 26 March 2020

Other legislation
- Made under: Public Health (Control of Disease) Act 1984
- Revoked by: Health Protection (Coronavirus, Restrictions) (England) Regulations 2020

Status: Revoked

Text of the Health Protection (Coronavirus, Business Closure) (England) Regulations 2020 as in force today (including any amendments) within the United Kingdom, from legislation.gov.uk.

The Health Protection (Coronavirus, Business Closure) (England) Regulations 2020 (SI 2020/327) is a statutory instrument (SI) enacted on 21 March 2020 by the Secretary of State for Health and Social Care, Matt Hancock, in response to the COVID-19 pandemic. It enforced the closure in England of businesses selling food and drink for consumption on the premises, as well as a range of other businesses such as nightclubs and indoor leisure centres where a high risk of infection could be expected.

SI 2020/327 remained in force for five days, until 1pm on 26 March, when it was revoked and its provisions re-enacted with more extensive restrictions by the Health Protection (Coronavirus, Restrictions) (England) Regulations 2020 (SI 2020/350). SI 2020/350 became the principal delegated English legislation restricting freedom of movement, gatherings, and business closures during the COVID-19 emergency period.

== Legal basis ==
The regulations were introduced by way of a statutory instrument made by the Secretary of State for Health and Social Care, Matt Hancock, using emergency powers available to him under the Public Health (Control of Disease) Act 1984. The regulations themselves state the legal basis for using such powers, namely "the serious and imminent threat to public health which is posed by the incidence and spread of severe acute respiratory syndrome coronavirus 2 (SARS-CoV-2) in England"; he also certified that the restrictions "are proportionate to what they seek to achieve, which is a public health response to that threat."

The regulations came into force immediately they were made, at 2pm on 21 March, and were laid before parliament two days later, on 23 March. The Secretary of State used section 45R of the Public Health (Control of Disease) Act 1984 to enact the regulations immediately subject to retrospective approval by resolution of each House of Parliament within twenty-eight days.

== Scope and review ==
The regulations (which applied in England only), imposed restrictions during the "relevant period" which was defined as the period between 2pm on 21 March 2020 and such ending date as the Secretary of State may later specify. He was required to review the regulations at least every 28 days, and to terminate the period if he considered the restrictions to be no longer necessary.

== Business closures ==
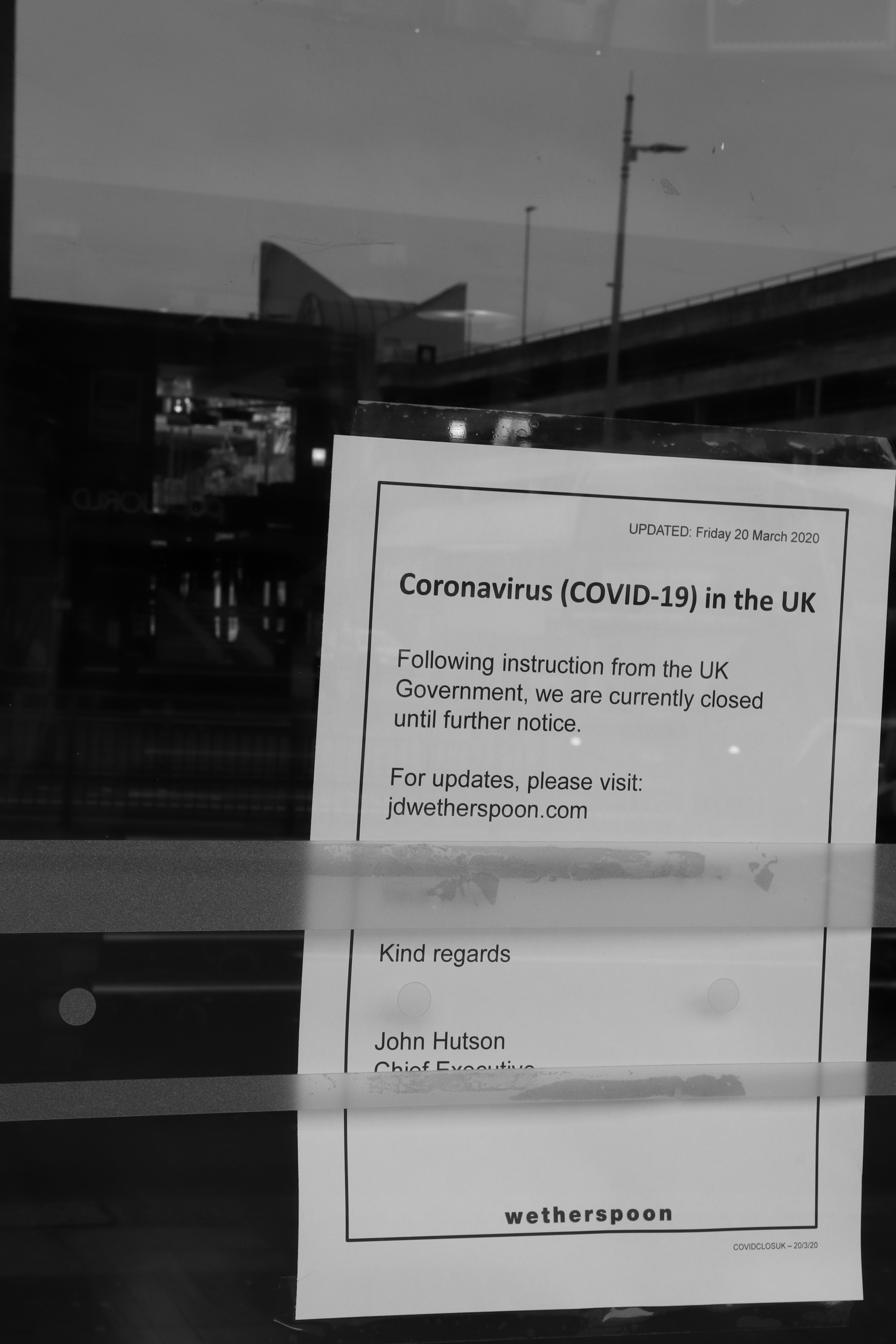
Pubs were included in the list of businesses which must close.

Businesses selling food or drink for consumption on the premises (including restaurants, cafes, bars and pubs) were required to close immediately – even where such premises included an adjacent (e.g. outdoor) seating area. Hotels were, however, allowed to continue to provide food to guests via room service.

Specific businesses set out in a list were also required to close, namely cinemas, theatres, nightclubs, bingo halls, concert halls, museums and galleries, casinos, betting shops, spas and massage parlours; as well as indoor leisure centres including fitness studios, gyms, swimming pools and skating rinks.

== Offences and enforcement ==
Contravention of the regulation without reasonable excuse was a criminal offence, punishable on summary conviction by a fine.

== Expiry and revocation ==
The regulations were set to automatically expire after six months, but in the event were revoked only five days after they came into force, on 26 March 2020.

== See also ==
- Coronavirus Act 2020
- Health Protection (Coronavirus) Regulations 2020
- Health Protection (Coronavirus, Restrictions) (England) Regulations 2020
- List of statutory instruments of the United Kingdom, 2020

== Bibliography ==
- "SI 327". Legislation.gov.uk. 21 March 2020. The Health Protection (Coronavirus, Business Closure) (England) Regulations 2020.
- "SI 350". Legislation.gov.uk. 26 March 2020. The Health Protection (Coronavirus, Restrictions) (England) Regulations 2020.
