= Health Protection (Coronavirus, Restrictions) (England) Regulations 2020 =

Emergency Lockdown Regulations in England

- Statutory Instrument
- Parliament of the United Kingdom
- Citation: SI 2020/350
- Introduced by: Matt Hancock, Secretary of State for Health and Social Care
- Territorial extent: England

Dates
- Made: 26 March 2020
- Laid before Parliament: 26 March 2020
- Commencement: 26 March 2020
- Revoked: 4 July 2020

Other legislation
- Made under: Public Health (Control of Disease) Act 1984
- Revoked by: Health Protection (Coronavirus, Restrictions) (No. 2) (England) Regulations 2020

Status: Revoked

Text of statute as originally enacted

Revised text of statute as amended

The full statutory instrument, SI 2020/350, as initially enacted

The Health Protection (Coronavirus, Restrictions) (England) Regulations 2020 (SI 2020/350), informally known as "the Lockdown Regulations", was a statutory instrument (SI) enacted on 26 March 2020 by the Secretary of State for Health and Social Care, Matt Hancock, in response to the COVID-19 pandemic. It became the principal delegated English legislation restricting freedom of movement, gatherings, and business closures during the COVID-19 emergency period until its revocation by the Health Protection (Coronavirus, Restrictions) (No. 2) (England) Regulations 2020 on 4 July 2020.

SI 2020/350 gave legal force to some of the 'lockdown' rules that had been announced by the Prime Minister Boris Johnson during a televised address on 23 March 2020. The SI related to England only; there were separate regulations for Wales, Scotland and Northern Ireland.

== Initial responses, February to March 2020 ==
In response to early concerns of the virus's potential effects in England the UK government had brought in on 10 February 2020 the Health Protection (Coronavirus) Regulations 2020 under which the Secretary of State designated specific isolation facilities at which infected persons could be held and treated. Other early responses by the government to the developing COVID-19 pandemic took the form of guidance rather than legislation. Statements by ministers included advice to schools to cancel trips abroad (12 March); and advice to the public to avoid non-essential travel, crowded places such as pubs and theatres, mass gatherings, and visits to care homes (16 March). Schools, colleges and nurseries were ultimately closed (announced 18 March, effective 21 March).

== Earlier regulations, in force 21 March 2020 ==
On 21 March the government enacted the Health Protection (Coronavirus, Business Closure) (England) Regulations 2020 (SI 2020/327) which enforced the closure in England of businesses selling food and drink for consumption on the premises, as well as a range of other businesses such as nightclubs and indoor leisure centres where a high risk of infection could be expected. SI 2020/350 revoked SI 2020/327, which had come into force only five days earlier, and re-enacted most of its provisions with more extensive restrictions.

On 25 March the emergency Coronavirus Act 2020 came into force, giving the government wide-ranging discretionary powers in a range of policy areas. However, the Lockdown Regulations and subsequent amendments continued, as a public health matter, to derive their legal authority from the emergency provisions contained within the Public Health (Control of Disease) Act 1984, as amended.

== Initial regulations, in force 26 March 2020 ==
=== Legal basis ===
SI 2020/350 was introduced by way of a statutory instrument made by the Secretary of State for Health and Social Care, Matt Hancock, using emergency powers available to him under the Public Health (Control of Disease) Act 1984. The regulations themselves stated the legal basis for using such powers, namely "the serious and imminent threat to public health which is posed by the incidence and spread of severe acute respiratory syndrome coronavirus 2 (SARS-CoV-2) in England"; he also certified that the restrictions "are proportionate to what they seek to achieve, which is a public health response to that threat."

The regulations came into force immediately they were made, at 1pm on 26 March, and were laid before parliament at 2.30pm on the same day. The Secretary of State used section 45R of the Public Health (Control of Disease) Act 1984 to enact the regulations immediately subject to retrospective approval by resolution of each House of Parliament within twenty-eight days. In the regulations themselves he stated that "by reason of urgency, it is necessary to make this instrument" without – as would normally be the case – having first placed a draft before parliament for prior discussion and approval.

=== Scope and review ===
The regulations (which applied in England only), imposed restrictions during the "emergency period" which was defined as the period between 1pm on 26 March 2020 and such ending date as the Secretary of State may later specify. He was required to review the regulations at least every 21 days, and to terminate any restriction that he considered to be no longer necessary.

=== Business closures ===
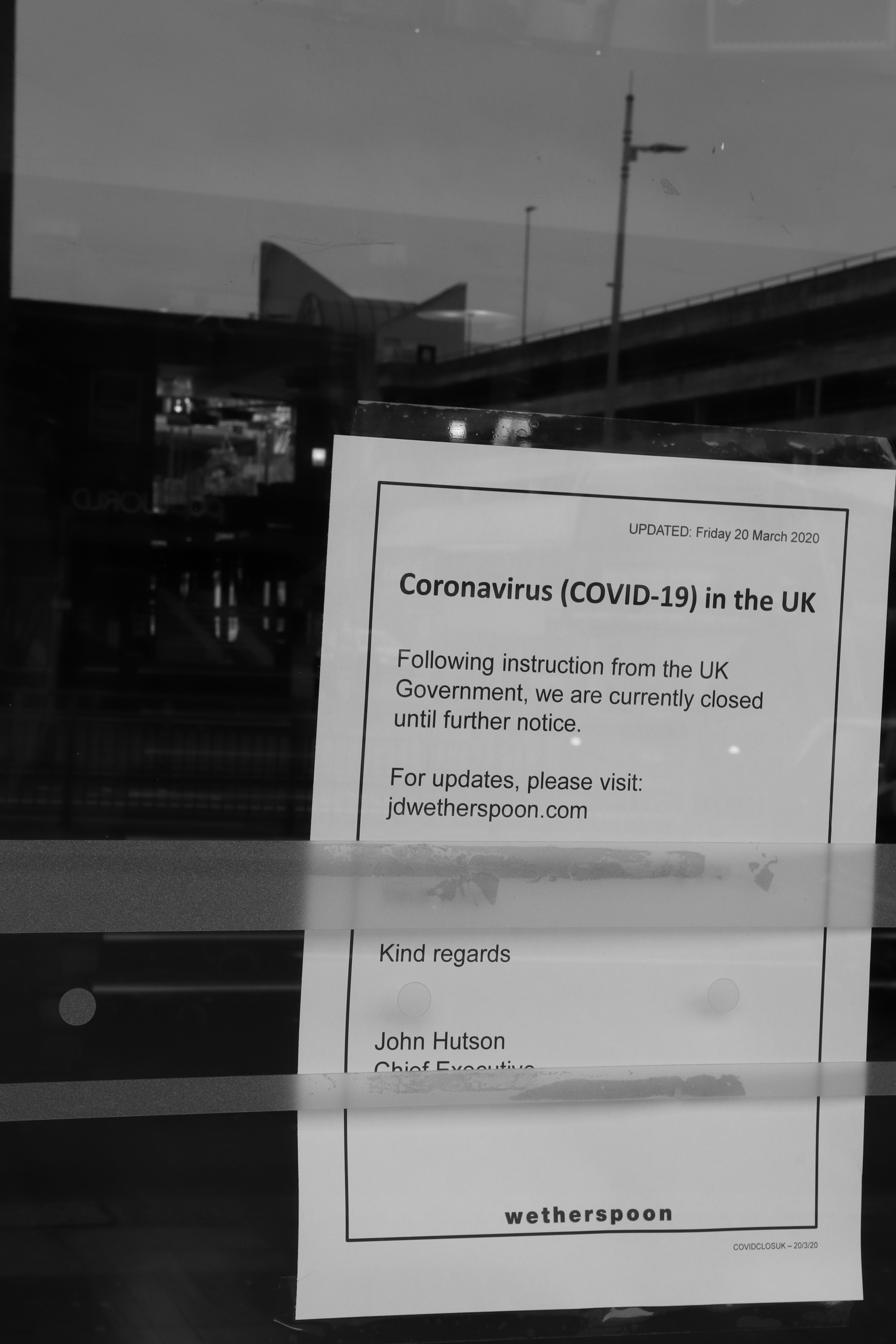
Pubs were included in the list of businesses which must close (photo taken 21 March 2020).

The business closures originally set out in the Health Protection (Coronavirus, Business Closure) (England) Regulations 2020 (SI 2020/327) were re-enacted. With a few exceptions, all premises selling food or drink for consumption on the premises had to remain closed including cafes, restaurants, bars and pubs; any adjacent seating area was to be treated as part of the premises. Hotels were, however, allowed to continue to provide food to guests via room service. The provision of food for consumption off the premises was explicitly stated to be allowed.

The regulation set out a new and more detailed list of non food-related businesses that had to cease entirely, including most sports venues, sports courts and gyms; indoor leisure facilities; nightclubs; personal care services such as beauty parlours, nail bars and hairdressers; cultural venues such as cinemas, theatres and museums; car showrooms; and all outdoor markets except stalls selling food.

In addition, libraries and all types of non-food shops were required to close unless they were on an approved list or were able to fulfil orders by delivery or without allowing personal access to their premises. The approved list of business premises allowed to remain open included food retailers, supermarkets; hardware, homeware and convenience stores; off licences; banks, building societies and post offices; laundrettes and dry cleaners; medical centres, pharmacies; vets, pet shops; petrol stations; car repairs; bicycle shops; taxi and vehicle hire; funeral directors; storage facilities; building and agricultural suppliers; car parks, and public toilets.

Subject to a few exceptions, all accommodation businesses such as hotels, B&Bs, holiday cottages and campsites had to cease operation.

Places of worship also had to be closed, except for funerals or to provide essential voluntary services such as food banks. Similarly, burial grounds and crematoria were off-limits to the public, except when actually in use for a burial or funeral.

=== Restrictions on movement ===
From 1pm on 26 March 2020, no person was, as a general rule, allowed to leave the place where they were living without 'reasonable excuse' (though this did not apply to anyone already homeless). No exhaustive definition of 'reasonable excuse' was provided, though the need to leave home to do any of the following was specifically allowed: to obtain basic necessities (including food and medical supplies) for those in the same household or for a vulnerable person; to obtain supplies for the essential upkeep, maintenance and functioning of the household, or that of a vulnerable person; to obtain money; to take exercise either alone or with other members of the household; to seek medical assistance; to provide emergency assistance, or assistance to a vulnerable person; to donate blood; to move house where reasonably necessary; to fulfil a legal obligation; to access critical public services including childcare; to continue existing child-access arrangements between parents; to avoid injury or illness or to escape a risk of harm.

Travel for the purposes of work or voluntary service was considered a 'reasonable excuse' only if it was not reasonably possible to work at home. Religious leaders were allowed to leave home to attend their place of worship.

Leaving home to attend a funeral was allowed only if the deceased was a close family member or a member of the person's household. Attending the funeral of a friend was prohibited unless there were neither close family members nor members of the deceased's household in attendance.

=== Restrictions on gatherings ===
Generally, all public gatherings of more than two people were prohibited. The only exceptions were: where all persons were members of the same household; where the gathering was essential for work purposes; to attend certain funerals; or where reasonably necessary to facilitate a house move, provide emergency assistance, provide care to a vulnerable person, to participate in legal proceedings or fulfil a legal obligation.

=== Offences and enforcement ===
Enforcement of the regulations was in the hands of the police, with provision being made for the local authority and the Secretary of State to designate additional people for some purposes.

It was a criminal offence to breach the restrictions on movement, or without reasonable excuse to breach any of the gathering or business closure rules. Enforcement was by fixed penalty notice (£60 for a first offence, halved for prompt payment) or by prosecution.

A police officer had the power to direct anyone in breach of the restrictions on movement to return home, and to direct unlawful public gatherings to disperse, in both cases using force if necessary. Failure to comply was an offence.

=== Expiry ===
The regulations were set to expire on 26 September 2020, but in the event were revoked on 4 July 2020.

== Amendments of 22 April 2020 ==
SI 2020/350 was amended on 22 April 2020, after 26 days, by the Health Protection (Coronavirus, Restrictions) (England) (Amendment) Regulations 2020 (SI 2020/447).

=== Legal basis ===
The amendments were made under the same emergency powers as the main regulations. They came into force at 11.00am on April, and were laid before parliament at 12.30pm on the same day. The Secretary of State again used section 45R of the 1984 act to enact the regulations "by reason of urgency" subject to retrospective approval by resolution of each House of Parliament within twenty-eight days.

=== Changes to the regulations ===
SI 2020/447 corrected some errors in the original drafting, and dealt with some unintended consequences. In connection with the restrictions on movement, it changed the wording from "no person may leave the place where they are living without reasonable excuse" to "no person may leave or be outside of the place where they are living without reasonable excuse" – thereby requiring a person travelling outside the home to have a reasonable excuse for the entire away-from-home period, and not just at the point of leaving the property.

To allow people to grieve for lost friends or household members, a new 'reasonable excuse' was added to allow some visits to burial grounds and gardens of remembrance. It was made clear that outdoor swimming pools must remain closed, but that livestock markets could continue. Cash points could also remain operational.

== Amendments of 13 May 2020 ==
SI 2020/350 was again amended on 13 May 2020, after a further 20 days, by the Health Protection (Coronavirus, Restrictions) (England) (Amendment) (No. 2) Regulations 2020 (SI 2020/500).

=== Legal basis ===
The amendments were made under the same emergency powers as the main regulations. They came into force at midnight prior to 13 May, and were laid before parliament at 9.30am on the same day. The Secretary of State again used section 45R of the 1984 act to enact the regulations "by reason of urgency" subject to retrospective approval by resolution of each House of Parliament within twenty-eight days.

=== Changes to the regulations ===
SI 2020/500 provided for the opening of garden centres and outdoor sports courts. It expanded the list of "reasonable excuses" for leaving home to permit people to collect goods that had been pre-ordered from a business; to use a waste or recycling centre; and to move home and engage in related activities such as viewing properties to buy or rent.

The rules on exercise away from the home were relaxed to allow it to be taken with several members of the same household or with one member of another household. Visits to public open spaces (including public gardens) for the purposes of open-air recreation were also allowed, again if desired with several members of the same household or with one member of another household.

The fixed penalty for a first breach of the regulations was increased from £60 to £100 – as before, with a 50% reduction for prompt payment.

== Amendments of 1 June 2020 ==
SI 2020/350 was again amended on 1 June 2020, after a further 19 days, by the Health Protection (Coronavirus, Restrictions) (England) (Amendment) (No. 3) Regulations 2020 (SI 2020/558).

The amendments increased the period for regular review of the regulations by the Secretary of State from 21 to 28 days.

=== Legal basis ===
The amendments were made under the same emergency powers as the main regulations. The regulations came into force at midnight prior to 1 June, and were laid before parliament at 11.30am on the same day. The Secretary of State again used section 45R of the 1984 act to enact the regulations "by reason of urgency" subject to retrospective approval by resolution of each House of Parliament within twenty-eight days.

=== Changes to business closures ===
Outdoor non-food markets could re-open, as could car showrooms. Outdoor sports amenities were also allowed to re-open, including water sports, stables, shooting and archery venues, golf courses and driving ranges.

Some types of venue, previously not mentioned, were now explicitly required to remain closed including indoor games, recreation and entertainment venues, theme and adventure parks, social clubs, model villages, aquariums and zoos, and farm attractions. In addition, indoor visitor attractions at venues which were otherwise allowed to open had to remain closed, including shops and visitor centres (but not toilets).

=== Changes to restrictions on movement ===
SI 2020/558 made significant changes to the earlier regulations and swept away entirely the general prohibition against leaving home. It was replaced with a new general rule that "No person may, without reasonable excuse, stay overnight at any place other than the place where they are living." As before, this rule did not apply to homeless persons. The list of "reasonable excuses" was also new, and included: the need to stay elsewhere while moving house, to attend certain funerals, to fulfil a legal obligation or participate in legal proceedings; or where it is reasonably necessary for work purposes or the provision of voluntary services, to provide care to a vulnerable person, to obtain medical assistance or provide emergency assistance, or to avoid injury or illness or escape a risk of harm.

It was also permitted to stay away overnight in order to continue existing child-access arrangements between parents; when the home was unsafe or unavailable; or where the person could not lawfully travel there or was required by law to stay elsewhere.

Additional exemptions were made for elite athletes, including permission to stay overnight away from home.

=== Changes to restrictions on gatherings ===
The previous regulation that restricted public gatherings was also swept away and replaced by a new general prohibition that applied not only to public places but also to private places. This banned outdoor gatherings of more than six people, and all indoor gatherings of any size. A 'gathering' for this purpose was when two or more people were present together in the same place in order to engage in any form of social interaction with each other, or to undertake any other activity with each other. Outdoor gatherings of six or fewer people were allowed, no matter how many households were represented.

A list of exceptions to this general rule was given (the list being exhaustive, without any open-ended "reasonable excuse" provision). The exceptions were: where all the persons in the gathering were members of the same household; certain funeral gatherings; or where the gathering was reasonably necessary for work or voluntary services, to facilitate a house move, to provide care to a vulnerable person, to provide emergency assistance, to avoid injury or illness or to escape a risk of harm, or to continue existing child-access arrangements between parents.

Gatherings for education (within an educational facility) and registered early years childcare were also permitted, thus allowing schools to re-open. Places of worship could again be used by registered early years childcare providers.

Additional exemptions were made for elite athletes, including the use of indoor elite training facilities.

=== Changes to offences and enforcement ===
The previous offence of leaving or being away from home without reasonable excuse was abolished. It was replaced with a new offence of staying away from home overnight, without reasonable excuse. The police had the power to direct any person breaching the rule to return home.

The police continued to have the power to break up unlawful gatherings and to direct people to return home. Where the gathering was in a public place (but not where it was private) they further had the power to remove persons to their homes, using force if necessary.

== Amendments of 13 & 15 June 2020 ==
SI 2020/350 was amended on 12 June 2020, after a further 11 days, by the Health Protection (Coronavirus, Restrictions) (England) (Amendment) (No. 4) Regulations 2020 (SI 2020/588).

=== Legal basis ===
The amendments were made under the same emergency powers as the main regulations. They came into force at on 13 and 15 June, and were laid before parliament at 2.30pm on 12 June, the first occasion that amendments had been presented to parliament before they entered into force. The Secretary of State again used section 45R of the 1984 act to enact the regulations "by reason of urgency" subject to retrospective approval by resolution of each House of Parliament within twenty-eight days.

=== Changes to business closures ===
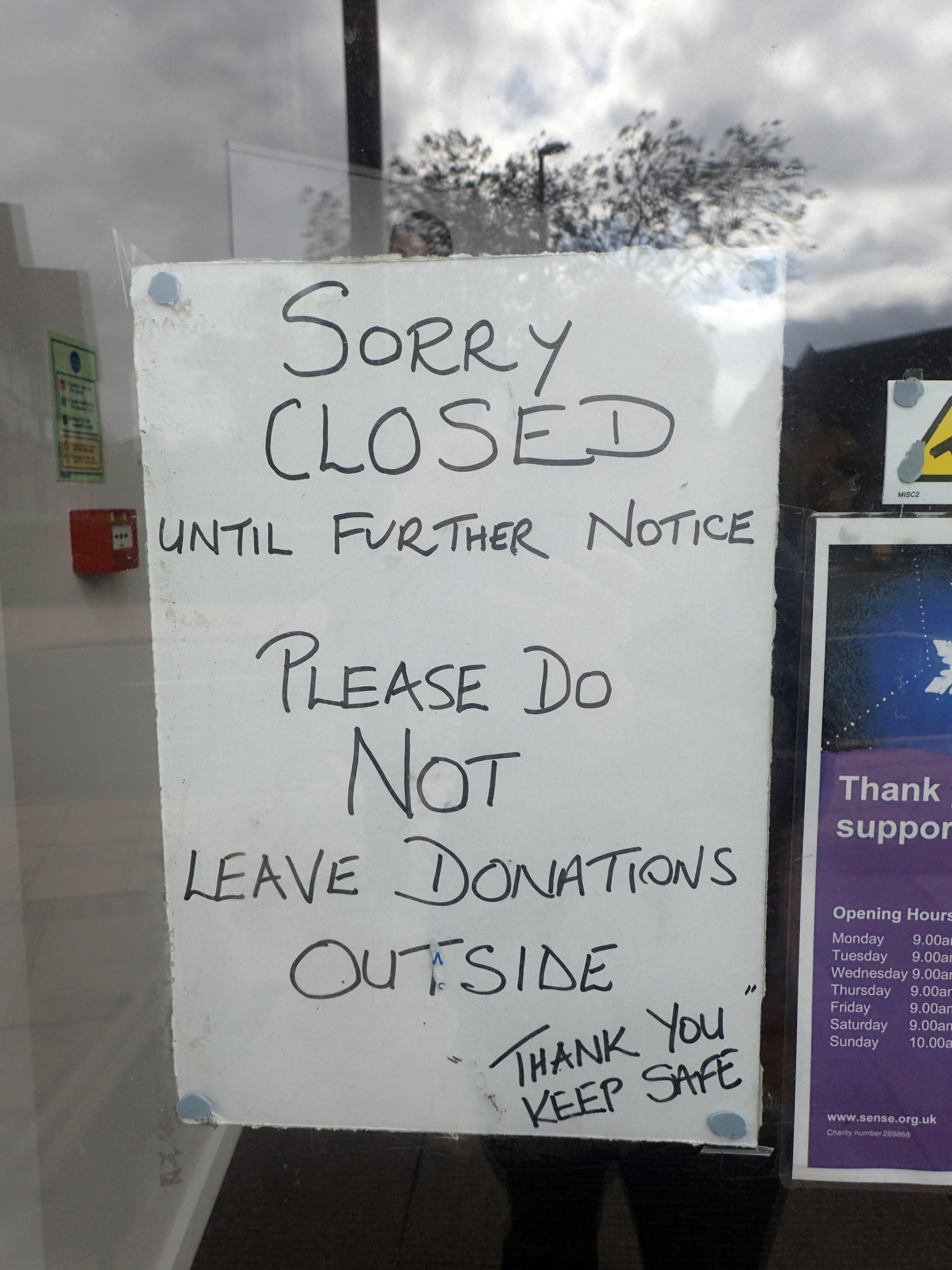
Although most shops were permitted to re-open from 15 June 2020, many remained closed (photo taken 20 June).

Under previous regulations, most retail businesses were required to close unless they appeared on a list of specific exemptions. SI 2020/588 reversed this, allowing businesses to re-open from 15 June 2021 unless on a list of prohibitions. This was reported as allowing "non-essential stores" to start operating again.

Businesses which remained prohibited from opening include restaurants, cafes, bars, pubs; theatres, concert halls; most cinemas, museums and galleries; nightclubs, social clubs, bingo halls, casinos; barbers, massage parlours and certain other personal service venues; swimming pools, skating rinks, gyms, playgrounds; funfairs, theme parks, model villages; certain indoor facilities including leisure and entertainment venues, sports courts, fitness studios and soft play areas; indoor attractions (apart from shops) at otherwise-outdoor venues such as gardens, heritage sites, and places with outdoor animal exhibits including farms, zoos and safari parks. Libraries still had to remain closed.

In addition to the general re-opening of retail businesses, there were some more specific relaxations of the rules. Betting shops and auction houses could re-open, as could drive-in cinemas (but not other cinemas) and retail art galleries. Outdoor animal-related attractions such as farms, zoos and safari parks could open, as could most indoor shops within visitor attractions that were otherwise outside.

Where a library, a place of worship, or any business that was still required to remain closed had a shop in a self-contained unit with its own separate entrance, that shop could open. Similarly, a cafe in a self-contained unit was allowed to sell food and drink but for consumption off the premises only.

Places of worship could again be used for private prayer (but not for communal worship). The restrictions on community centres were relaxed to allow them once again to host indoor markets.

=== Changes to restrictions on gatherings and freedom of movement ===
SI 2020/588 introduced from 13 June the concept of "linked households" (described by the government as "support bubbles"). This in limited circumstances allowed two previously-separate households to be treated as one for the purpose of meeting up (being part of a 'gathering', to use the wording of the regulation) either outside or indoors. It also allowed the members of one household to stay overnight at the home of the other.

In order to become linked, one of the households had to consist of exactly one adult (no more), while the other could have any number of adults. Both households could include any number of children under the age of 18 on 12 June 2020. All the adults had to agree to the linking, and each household could become linked to only one other household. If the linkage was later broken, neither household could subsequently link with any other.

The rules on gatherings were also relaxed from 13 June to allow medical appointments and births to be accompanied, and to permit certain visits to people in hospital, hospices and care homes. Some visits could also be made, regardless of location, to any person that the visitor reasonably believed to be dying. Where necessary the visitor in each of these situations was also allowed to stay overnight away from home.

== Review ==
The powers granted by SI 2020/350 had to be reviewed every 28 days. On 16 April, the government extended the lockdown for a further 21 days (to 7 May).

== Revocation 4 July 2020 ==
On 4 July 2020 the regulations were revoked in their entirety and were replaced with the Health Protection (Coronavirus, Restrictions) (No. 2) (England) Regulations 2020 (SI 2020/684). These regulations relaxed many of the restrictions, but introduced a new power for the Secretary of State to close outdoor public areas.

== Government announcements ==
On 23 March the Cabinet Office and the Ministry of Housing, Communities and Local Government issued guidance listing the affected types of businesses, premises and venues, and the exceptions; this document was reissued on 13 May to reflect the SI 2020/500 amendments, and for the first time referenced separate guidance issued by the three devolved administrations.

Following SI 2020/500, the government published updated guidance on spending time outdoors, and updated earlier guidance around moving home.

Contrary to widespread media reports that people could only exercise once per day, neither the initial regulations nor the amendments make any mention of frequency or duration; nor did they require people by law to maintain the recommended two-metre separation.

== Response ==
The cross-bench peer and human rights barrister David Anderson said:

...while the chosen legal basis of the Public Health (Control of Disease) Act 1984 may be held to be sufficient for the remarkable restriction on liberty that is Regulation 6, that is not, perhaps, a foregone conclusion.

Barrister Kevin Holder said:

The list of reasonable excuses set out in Regulation 6(2) is non-exhaustive, however citizens should exercise caution when considering undertaking activities outside those specifically sanctioned, as they may have to justify them as constituting a "reasonable excuse" to Police and the Courts. It should be borne in mind given that the circumstances listed in Regulation 6(2) are comprehensive (and in some respects generous), the Police and Judiciary are likely to be conservative in determining what constitutes "reasonable excuse."

Lawyer and legal journalist David Allen Green said:

These provisions – which are alongside prohibitions on freedom of assembly, freedom of worship and freedom to conduct business – are the most illiberal laws imposed in England since at least the second world war. [...] All this is justified – there is a public health emergency, and the powers under the 1984 Act exist for just this sort of emergency.

However, following amendment by SI 2020/447, Green also said:

This is literally incredible: parliament is now back in session, and so there is no good reason whatsoever for the amendments (and the regulations) to avoid having parliamentary approval.

The government – even in an emergency – should not be in the habit of creating or extending criminal offences by ministerial fiat when parliament is sitting. [...] Something worrying is happening here.

Former Justice of the Supreme Court, Lord Sumption, said that there is no moral or principled justification for these restrictions, saying:

A society in which the Government can confine most of the population without controversy is not one in which civilised people would want to live

== Legal challenges ==
Businessman Simon Dolan sought judicial review of the regulations on the following grounds:

- Whether the regulations are unlawful because they are outside of the powers conferred by Parliament,
- Whether the Secretary of State for Health and Social Care had acted unlawfully by, fettering his discretion to review the Regulations by requiring that five tests be met before reviewing the Regulations, failing to take relevant considerations into account in the decision-making process, acting irrationally in making or maintaining the Regulations or failing to act proportionately when deciding not to terminate the Regulations,
- Whether the restrictions on movement contained in the regulations involved a breach of the right to liberty guaranteed by Article 5 of the European Convention on Human Rights,
- Whether the restrictions on movement and gathering contained in the regulations involved a breach of the right to a private and family life guaranteed by Article 8 of the European Convention on Human Rights,
- Whether the requirement to close places of worship breaches the right to freedom of thought, conscience and religion guaranteed by Article 9 of the European Convention on Human Rights,
- Whether the restriction on gatherings breaches the right to freedom of assembly and association guaranteed by Article 11 of the European Convention on Human Rights
- Whether the regulations involve a deprivation of property or an unlawful control on the use of property, and
- Whether requiring schools to close constitutes a breach of Article 2 of the first protocol to the European Convention on Human Rights.

These claims were all dismissed by Mr Justice Lewis on 6 July 2020. The judge concluded that:

The Secretary of State had the legal power to make the Regulations. In making and maintaining the Regulations, he has not fettered his discretion. He has had regard to relevant considerations. He has not acted irrationally. He has not acted disproportionately.

The claim to challenge the restrictions on movement and gatherings in the original regulations 6 and 7 are academic as those regulations have been replaced. The challenge to the 18 March 2020 announcement relating to schools is also academic in the circumstances. Permission to apply for judicial review to challenge those regulations and that decision is refused.

The amended regulation 6 in force on 2 July 2020 requiring persons not to stay overnight other than where they live is not even arguably a deprivation of liberty within the meaning of Article 5 of the Convention. Permission to challenge that regulation is refused.

The Regulations in force on 2 July 2020 did involve a restriction on the freedom of assembly and association. That freedom is an important one in a democratic society. The context in which the restrictions were imposed, however, was of a global pandemic where a novel, highly infectious disease capable of causing death was spreading and was transmissible between humans. There was no known cure and no vaccine. There was a legal duty to review the restrictions periodically and to end the restrictions if they were no longer necessary to achieve the aim of reducing the spread and the incidence of coronavirus. The Regulations would end after six months in any event. In those, possible unique, circumstances, there is no realistic prospect that a court would find that regulations adopted to reduce the opportunity for transmission by limiting contact between individuals was disproportionate. Permission to apply for judicial review on that ground is refused.

The Regulations do not, even arguably, involve a breach of the right to respect for private and family life guaranteed by Article 8 of the Convention or of the first claimant's property rights under Article 1 of the First Protocol to the Convention. Permission to challenge the Regulations on those grounds is refused.

The decision to deny a judicial review of the regulations was subsequently challenged by Simon Dolan. On 4 August 2020, Lord Justice Hickinbotom overturned the decision of Mr Justice Lewis allowing for permission to appeal in a full and open court. Lord Justice Hickinbotom stated that he was persuaded that the claims potentially raise fundamental issues concerning the proper sphere for democratically accountable ministers and that the grounds should be considered by the full court in open court.

On 1 December 2020 the Court of Appeal published their judgement and dismissed the challenges raised against the regulations. The court found that the only argument for which judicial review could be sought was the vires argument (that the secretary of state did not have a legal authority to make the regulations). The court found that the secretary of state did in fact have the requisite powers to make the regulations and therefore dismissed this claim. The court refused permission to appeal the findings of Mr Justice Lewis in respect of domestic law arguments or the arguments that had been made under the Human Rights Act 1998.

== See also ==
- Coronavirus Act 2020
- Health Protection (Coronavirus) Regulations 2020
- Health Protection (Coronavirus, Restrictions) (No. 2) (England) Regulations 2020
- COVID-19 local lockdown regulations in England
- Health Protection (Coronavirus, Wearing of Face Coverings on Public Transport) (England) Regulations 2020
- Health Protection (Coronavirus, Wearing of Face Coverings in a Relevant Place) (England) Regulations 2020
- Health Protection (Coronavirus, International Travel) (England) Regulations 2020
- List of statutory instruments of the United Kingdom, 2020

== Bibliography ==
- "SI 327". Legislation.gov.uk. 21 March 2020. The Health Protection (Coronavirus, Business Closure) (England) Regulations 2020.
- "SI 350". Legislation.gov.uk. 26 March 2020. The Health Protection (Coronavirus, Restrictions) (England) Regulations 2020.
- "SI 447". Legislation.gov.uk. 22 April 2020. The Health Protection (Coronavirus, Restrictions) (England) (Amendment) Regulations 2020.
- "SI 500". Legislation.gov.uk. 12 May 2020. The Health Protection (Coronavirus, Restrictions) (England) (Amendment) (No. 2) Regulations 2020.
- "SI 558". Legislation.gov.uk. 31 May 2020. The Health Protection (Coronavirus, Restrictions) (England) (Amendment) (No. 3) Regulations 2020.
- "SI 588". Legislation.gov.uk. 12 June 2020. The Health Protection (Coronavirus, Restrictions) (England) (Amendment) (No 4) Regulations 2020.
- "Dolan & Ors v Secretary of State for Health And Social Care & Anor [2020] EWHC 1786". bailii.org. 6 July 2020.
- "Dolan & Ors, R (On the Application Of) v Secretary of State for Health And Social Care & Anor [2020] EWCA Civ 1605". bailii.org. 1 December 2020.
