= Health Protection (Coronavirus) Regulations 2020 =

United Kingdom emergency legislation

- Statutory Instrument
- Parliament of the United Kingdom
- Citation: SI 2020/129
- Introduced by: Matt Hancock, Secretary of State for Health and Social Care
- Territorial extent: England and Wales (applies to England only)

Dates
- Made: 10 February 2020
- Laid before Parliament: 10 February 2020
- Commencement: 10 February 2020
- Revoked: 25 March 2020

Other legislation
- Made under: Public Health (Control of Disease) Act 1984
- Revoked by: Coronavirus Act 2020

Status: Revoked

Text of statute as originally enacted

The Health Protection (Coronavirus) Regulations 2020 (SI 2020/129) was a set of regulations that came into effect in England on 10 February 2020 as a statutory instrument made under the Public Health (Control of Disease) Act 1984. The regulations were revoked on 25 March 2020.

== Legal basis ==
The regulations were enacted by the Secretary of State for Health and Social Care, Matt Hancock, on the basis that the incidence and transmission of COVID-19 caused by the SARS-CoV-2 virus represented a sufficient public health threat to introduce powers to keep individuals in isolation where public health professionals believed there was reasonable risk. The regulations applied to England only.

== Provisions ==
The regulations provided powers for the government to detain in isolation any person believed to be infected with Coronavirus and who had within the preceding 14 days arrived in England from an "infected area". The detained person was required to answer questions about their health, contacts and travel history, and to allow the taking of biological samples. Failure to comply, or attempting to abscond from isolation, was a criminal offence.

On 14 February 2020 the Secretary of State designated Arrowe Park Hospital in Merseyside and the Kents Hill Park centre in Milton Keynes as "isolation" facilities, and the Hubei province of China (including Wuhan City) as an "infected area".

== Revocation ==
The regulations were revoked on 25 March 2020, on the same day that the Coronavirus Act 2020 came it force. More stringent regulations were introduced the next day, as the Health Protection (Coronavirus, Restrictions) (England) Regulations 2020 (SI 2020/350).

== Background ==
According to a report in the Daily Mirror, the regulations were originally brought in after a person flown back to the UK from Wuhan threatened to "abscond" from the Arrowe Park Hospital isolation unit. The regulations provided the necessary powers to physically prevent someone from leaving.

== See also ==
- Health Protection (Coronavirus, Restrictions) (England) Regulations 2020
- List of statutory instruments of the United Kingdom, 2020

== Bibliography ==
- "SI 129". Legislation.gov.uk. 10 February 2020. The Health Protection (Coronavirus) Regulations 2020.
