= Coronavirus Act 2020 =

UK emergency legislation

Coronavirus Act 2020 (Note: Section 102.)
- Act of Parliament
- Parliament of the United Kingdom
- Long title: An Act to make provision in connection with coronavirus; and for connected purposes.
- Citation: 2020 c. 7
- Introduced by: Matt Hancock, Secretary of State for Health and Social Care (Commons); James Bethell, 5th Baron Bethell (Lords)
- Territorial extent: England and Wales; Scotland; Northern Ireland (varies by provision); (Note: Section 100.)

Dates
- Royal assent: 25 March 2020
- Commencement: 25 March 2020 (Note: According to sections 87–88 of the act, the act as a whole commenced on the day it was passed, but various of its specific provisions come into force according to government discretion; national authorities may suspend and revive provisions of the Act.)
- Expired: Partially expired 25 March 2022, some provisions still in force
Other legislation
Amends	Judicature (Northern Ireland) Act 1978; Magistrates' Courts Act 1980; Criminal Justice Act 1988; Social Security Contributions and Benefits Act 1992; Social Security Administration Act 1992; Social Security Contributions and Benefits (Northern Ireland) Act 1992; Social Security Administration (Northern Ireland) Act 1992; Criminal Procedure (Scotland) Act 1995; Tribunals, Courts and Enforcement Act 2007; Recall of MPs Act 2015
Amended by	Covert Human Intelligence Sources (Criminal Conduct) Act 2021; Employment Rights Act 2025
Relates to	Civil Contingencies Act 2004; Coronavirus (Scotland) Act 2020

Status: Amended

History of passage through Parliament

Text of statute as originally enacted

Revised text of statute as amended

The Coronavirus Act 2020 (c. 7) is an act of the Parliament of the United Kingdom that granted the government emergency powers to handle the COVID-19 pandemic. The act allowed the government the discretionary power to limit or suspend public gatherings, to detain individuals suspected to be infected by COVID-19, and to intervene or relax regulations in a range of sectors to limit transmission of the disease, ease the burden on public health services, and assist healthcare workers and the economically affected. Areas covered by the act included the National Health Service, social care, schools, police, Border Force, local councils, funerals and courts. The act was introduced to Parliament on 19 March 2020, and passed the House of Commons without a vote on 23 March, and the House of Lords on 25 March. The act received royal assent on 25 March 2020.

The act specified a two-year time limit that could be shortened or lengthened by six months at ministerial discretion. Several of the act's provisions were revoked early, on 17 July 2021, while certain others were extended for six months beyond the two-year period.

Politicians from several parties demanded closer parliamentary scrutiny of the legislation while it was being debated in Parliament. Advocacy groups such as Liberty and Disability Rights UK likewise called for closer examination of the act and raised concerns over its effects on human rights during and after the pandemic.

== Legislative history ==
The act was introduced by the Secretary of State for Health and Social Care, Matt Hancock, on 19 March 2020, and passed all remaining stages of consideration in the House of Commons on 23 March without a vote. It received all stages of consideration in the House of Lords on 25 March, and received royal assent on 25 March 2020.

Conservative MP and former Brexit Secretary David Davis tabled an amendment on 21 March to restrict the time limit of the bill to a "brick-wall stop" of one year, threatening a backbench rebellion. Conceding to concerns from both Conservative and Labour MPs over infrequent parliamentary scrutiny, on 23 March the government itself amended the bill to require parliamentary renewal of its powers every six months.

The Scottish Parliament agreed a Legislative Consent Motion on 24 March 2020 for the act to apply to Scotland, and subsequently passed the Coronavirus (Scotland) Act 2020 to regulate the devolved response to the Coronavirus pandemic.

On 25 March 2021, MPs voted by 484 to 76 to extend the emergency coronavirus powers for a further six months.

== Provisions ==
The provisions of the Coronavirus Act enabled the government to restrict or prohibit public gatherings, control or suspend public transport, order businesses such as shops and restaurants to close, temporarily detain people suspected of COVID-19 infection, suspend the operation of ports and airports, temporarily close educational institutions and childcare premises, enrol medical students and retired healthcare workers in the health services, relax regulations to ease the burden on healthcare services, and assume control of death management in particular local areas. The government stated that these powers may be "switched on and off" according to the medical advice it receives.

The act also provided for measures to combat the economic effects of the pandemic. It included the power to halt the eviction of tenants, protect emergency volunteers from becoming unemployed, and provide special insurance cover for healthcare staff taking on additional responsibilities. Powers were included to allow the government to reimburse to employers, the cost of statutory sick pay for employees affected by COVID-19, and requiring supermarkets to report supply chain disruptions to the government.

The act formally postponed the local elections originally scheduled for May 2020 and granted the UK and relevant devolved governments the power to postpone any other election, local referendum, or recall petition until 6 May 2021. Local councillors, elected mayors and Police and Crime Commissioners originally due for election in 2020 served three-year terms after their election in 2021, rather than the normal four years, in order to maintain the normal election cycle.

=== Time limit and renewal ===
The act specified a two-year time limit which could be shortened or lengthened by six months at ministerial discretion. The act was later amended to make it subject to parliamentary renewal every six months; originally, it was to have been returned to Parliament for debate one year after its enactment.

=== Periodic review ===
Section 88 of the act enabled national authorities to suspend (and later revive, if appropriate) many of the act's provisions, and section 97 required the Secretary of State to publish, every two months, a report on the status of the non-devolved provisions. On 7 May 2020, the Department of Health & Social Care published a table showing the status of each provision, including those not at that time in force. This was followed on 29 May by the first two-monthly report, which gave for provisions not yet in force a brief explanation of the reason, and for those in force an outline of the extent to which the provision has been used. Further reports followed every two months. The fifteenth report in September 2022 was described as the final such report – the last two temporary provisions having expired on 24 September – although a number of permanent provisions remained in force.

=== Evolution and partial expiry ===
By September 2020, the provisions addressing potential staff shortages in mental health services had not been used in England, and had only been commenced in part in Wales. An instrument to remove these provisions was laid before Parliament on 21 October and came into force on 9 December 2020.

As part of the one-year review in March 2021, the government stated its intention to revoke twelve sections of the act and suspend three provisions. Changes were subsequently made via statutory instrument.

Several sections of the act were revoked early, on 17 July 2021, by The Coronavirus Act (Early Expiry) Regulations 2021, SI 2021/856. Further expiries came into force on 9 December 2021, bringing the number of expired provisions to 20.

Many of the provisions expired automatically on 24 March 2022. Five provisions were amended by SI 2022/362 to expire six months later; these concern procedures for coroners' inquests (section 30), remote court hearings (53–55) and the waiting period before payment of Statutory Sick Pay in Northern Ireland (43). During those six months, the government intended to make the remote court powers permanent under the Police, Crime, Sentencing and Courts Act 2022.

== Reception ==
BBC News reported on 19 March 2020 that there was general agreement in Parliament on the measures contained in the act, but some MPs had raised criticisms of their extended duration. Conservative backbencher Steve Baker reluctantly supported the bill but said that it was ushering in a "dystopian society" and urged the government not to allow the measures to continue "one moment longer" than necessary. The outgoing Labour leader Jeremy Corbyn wrote to Prime Minister Boris Johnson on 18 March requesting that MPs be granted a vote to renew the bill every six months, while Labour MP Chris Bryant argued that the bill should be subject to renewal every 30 days. The acting leader of the Liberal Democrats, Ed Davey, also requested that the bill be subject to more frequent parliamentary scrutiny.

Commentator Ian Dunt labelled the act the "most extensive encroachment on British civil liberties ... ever seen outside of wartime". The human rights pressure group Liberty called for closer scrutiny of the bill, raising concerns that significant restrictions on civil liberties could remain in place beyond the end of the pandemic, and Disability Rights UK also raised serious concerns about the implications of the Coronavirus Bill on human rights, especially the rights of vulnerable groups, including disabled people.

Lord Sumption in a podcast aired on 10 September 2020 pointed out that the "lockdown and the quarantine rules and most of the other regulations have been made under the Public Health (Control of Disease) Act 1984", not the Coronavirus Act 2020.

== See also ==
- Health Protection (Coronavirus) Regulations 2020, revoked by this act
- The Health Protection (Coronavirus, Restrictions) (England) Regulations 2020
- Civil Contingencies Act 2004
- Coronavirus (Scotland) Act 2020
