= Public Health (Control of Disease) Act 1984 =

Act of the Parliament of the United Kingdom

Public Health (Control of Disease) Act 1984 (Note: Section 79(1).)
- Act of Parliament
- Parliament of the United Kingdom
- Long title: An Act to consolidate certain enactments relating to the control of disease and to the establishment and functions of port health authorities, including enactments relating to burial and cremation and to the regulation of common lodging–houses and canal boats, with amendments to give effect to recommendations of the Law Commission.
- Citation: 1984 c. 22
- Territorial extent: England and Wales (Note: Section 79(3).)

Dates
- Royal assent: 26 June 1984
- Commencement: 26 September 1984 (Note: Section 79(2).)

Other legislation
- Amends: See § Repealed enactments
- Repeals/revokes: See § Repealed enactments
- Amended by: Building Act 1984; Local Government Act 1985; Housing (Consequential Provisions) Act 1985; Airports Act 1986; Social Security Act 1986; Territorial Sea Act 1987; Food Safety Act 1990; Environmental Protection Act 1990; Clean Air Act 1993; Statute Law (Repeals) Act 1993; Local Government (Wales) Act 1994; Health Authorities Act 1995; Merchant Shipping Act 1995; Pollution Prevention and Control Act 1999; Care Standards Act 2000; Health and Social Care (Community Health and Standards) Act 2003; Statute Law (Repeals) Act 2004; National Health Service (Consequential Provisions) Act 2006; Local Government and Public Involvement in Health Act 2007; References to Health Authorities Order 2007; Health and Social Care Act 2008; Airport Charges Regulations 2011; Health and Social Care Act 2012; Protection of Freedoms Act 2012; Legal Aid, Sentencing and Punishment of Offenders Act 2012 (Fines on Summary Conviction) Regulations 2015

Status: Amended

Text of statute as originally enacted

Revised text of statute as amended

Text of the Public Health (Control of Disease) Act 1984 as in force today (including any amendments) within the United Kingdom, from legislation.gov.uk.

The Public Health (Control of Disease) Act 1984 (c. 22) is an act of the Parliament of the United Kingdom for England and Wales which requires physicians to notify the 'proper officer' of the local authority of any person deemed to be suffering from a notifiable disease. It also provides powers to isolate infected individuals to prevent the spread of such a disease. The act forms the basis of various legislation connected to the COVID-19 pandemic in the United Kingdom.

== History ==
The act, originally enacted to address public health concerns, has been a critical tool in managing infectious diseases such as tuberculosis in the UK. Over the years, it has undergone several amendments to adapt to evolving public health needs and legal standards. One of the key provisions of the Act allows for the detention of individuals with tuberculosis to prevent the spread of the disease, a measure that has sparked significant debate. Critics argue that this provision may infringe on individual rights, particularly in light of the European Convention on Human Rights, which the UK joined in 2000. Despite these concerns, the Act has played a vital role in controlling outbreaks and protecting public health, though it continues to be scrutinized and discussed in legal and public health circles.

=== COVID-19 pandemic ===
This act was used as the legal basis for the regulations that put into force the stay at home order announced by Boris Johnson on 23 March 2020 in response to the COVID-19 pandemic, the Health Protection (Coronavirus, Restrictions) (England) Regulations 2020. The Health Protection (Coronavirus, Restrictions) (England) Regulations 2020 (SI 2020/350) later gave legal force to some of the 'lockdown' rules that had been announced.

Misinformation about the act circulated online during the COVID-19 pandemic. This included claims that it had been amended to mandate COVID-19 vaccination; according to Full Fact, the act does not provide any power to mandate any treatment or vaccination.

== Provisions ==
=== Repealed enactments ===
Section 78(b) of the act repealed 21 enactments, listed in schedule 3 to the act.

Enactments repealed by section 78(b)
Citation	Short title	Extent of repeal
26 Geo. 5 & 1 Edw. 8. c. 49	Public Health Act 1936	Sections 2 to 5.
26 Geo. 5 & 1 Edw. 8. c. 49	Public Health Act 1936	In section 9, in subsection (1), the words "port health district, or a", in subsection (2), the words "the port health authority or", and in subsection (3), the words "port health district,".
26 Geo. 5 & 1 Edw. 8. c. 49	Public Health Act 1936	In section 10, the words "port health authority or".
26 Geo. 5 & 1 Edw. 8. c. 49	Public Health Act 1936	Section 143(1) to (7) and (10).
26 Geo. 5 & 1 Edw. 8. c. 49	Public Health Act 1936	Sections 147 to 170.
26 Geo. 5 & 1 Edw. 8. c. 49	Public Health Act 1936	Section 179.
26 Geo. 5 & 1 Edw. 8. c. 49	Public Health Act 1936	Sections 242 to 245.
26 Geo. 5 & 1 Edw. 8. c. 49	Public Health Act 1936	Section 249(2).
26 Geo. 5 & 1 Edw. 8. c. 49	Public Health Act 1936	Section 251.
26 Geo. 5 & 1 Edw. 8. c. 49	Public Health Act 1936	Sections 253 to 256.
26 Geo. 5 & 1 Edw. 8. c. 49	Public Health Act 1936	Section 258.
26 Geo. 5 & 1 Edw. 8. c. 49	Public Health Act 1936	In section 267(4), the word "V".
26 Geo. 5 & 1 Edw. 8. c. 49	Public Health Act 1936	In section 268, in subsection (1), the word "V", and in subsection (4) the words from "for preventing" to "thereof".
26 Geo. 5 & 1 Edw. 8. c. 49	Public Health Act 1936	In section 322(2), the words ", port health authority".
26 Geo. 5 & 1 Edw. 8. c. 49	Public Health Act 1936	In section 324, in subsections (1) and (2), the words ", port health authority".
26 Geo. 5 & 1 Edw. 8. c. 49	Public Health Act 1936	In section 325, the words ", port health authority".
26 Geo. 5 & 1 Edw. 8. c. 49	Public Health Act 1936	In section 343(1), the definition of "notifiable disease".
11 & 12 Geo. 6. c. 29	National Assistance Act 1948	Section 50.
4 & 5 Eliz. 2. c. 16	Food and Drugs Act 1955	Section 88(1).
9 & 10 Eliz. 2. c. 64	Public Health Act 1961	Section 1(2).
9 & 10 Eliz. 2. c. 64	Public Health Act 1961	Sections 38 to 42.
1963 c. 33	London Government Act 1963	Section 41.
1963 c. 33	London Government Act 1963	In section 46(4), the words from "and section 50" to "dead)," and the words "and 50(2)".
1963 c. 33	London Government Act 1963	In Schedule 11, in Part I, in paragraph 11, the words "section 41 of this Act", and paragraphs 22 and 25; in Part II, paragraph 8.
1966 c. 42	Local Government Act 1966	In Schedule 5, paragraph 2.
1967 c. 80	Criminal Justice Act 1967	In Part I of Schedule 3, the entries relating to sections 144(2), 148, 149, 152(4), 154(2), 159(3), 160(4) and 170(3) of the Public Health Act 1936 and the entry relating to section 39(2) of the Public Health Act 1961.
1968 c. 46	Health Services and Public Health Act 1968	Sections 47 to 50.
1968 c. 46	Health Services and Public Health Act 1968	Sections 52 to 58.
1968 c. 46	Health Services and Public Health Act 1968	Section 70.
1970 c. 42	Local Authority Social Services Act 1970	In Schedule 1, the item relating to section 50(3) and (4) of the National Assistance Act 1948.
1972 c. 70	Local Government Act 1972	Section 180(3)(i).
1972 c. 70	Local Government Act 1972	In Schedule 14, paragraphs 13 to 16, 38, 39, 46 and 47.
1972 c. 70	Local Government Act 1972	In Schedule 23, paragraph 2(12).
1972 c. 70	Local Government Act 1972	In Schedule 29, in paragraph 44(1), the words "and 50(2)".
1973 c. 38	Social Security Act 1973	In Schedule 27, paragraph 7.
1974 c. 3	Slaughterhouses Act 1974	In section 28, paragraph (a).
1974 c. 40	Control of Pollution Act 1974	In Schedule 3, paragraphs 6 and 19.
1975 c. 18	Social Security (Consequential Provisions) Act 1975	In Schedule 2, paragraph 5.
1975 c. 78	Airports Authority Act 1975	Section 15(4).
1976 c. 57	Local Government (Miscellaneous Provisions) Act 1976	In section 27(4), the words "and port health authorities".
1979 c. 2	Customs and Excise Management Act 1979	In Schedule 4, in paragraph 12, the item relating to the Public Health Act 1936.
1980 c. 53	Health Services Act 1980	In Schedule 1, paragraphs 1, 2, 3 and 19(2) and (5).
1982 c. 16	Civil Aviation Act 1982	Section 36(5) to (7) and (9).
1982 c. 30	Local Government (Miscellaneous Provisions) Act 1982	Section 42.
1982 c. 30	Local Government (Miscellaneous Provisions) Act 1982	In Schedule 6, paragraphs 1 to 3 and paragraph 6.
1983 c. 41	Health and Social Services and Social Security Adjudications Act 1983	Section 26(1).
1983 c. 41	Health and Social Services and Social Security Adjudications Act 1983	In Schedule 9, paragraph 1.

== See also ==
- Biosecurity Act 2015
- British government response to the COVID-19 pandemic
- Civil Contingencies Act 2004
- Coronavirus Act 2020
- Detention of Roger George Youd
- Public Health (Infectious Diseases) Regulations 1985
- Public Health (Infectious Diseases) Regulations 1988
