= Hope Sussex Community =

Hope Sussex Community is an "autonomous community centre" established in 2022 near Netherfield in East Sussex, England. Founded by former members of the British National Party (BNP), the group supports homeschooling families who have removed their children from mainstream education, providing a curriculum that includes various conspiracy theories. It promotes anti-vaccination views, survivalism, and resistance to perceived state control and has hosted events featuring prominent conspiracy theorists and far-right figures.

== History ==
The group began in 2021 or 2022 amid the anti-lockdown and anti-vaccine movements during the COVID-19 pandemic in the United Kingdom. It was founded on an 80-acre (32.37 hectare) site. According to Companies House, it was incorporated in October 2022 as "Hope Sussex Community – Home of Positive Energy". That year, it was investigated by Ofsted for allegedly operating as an unregistered illegal school; these investigations were blocked by Hope Sussex. A criminal probe was closed due to limited inspection powers.

== Leadership ==
The group is led by Matthew Single and his wife Sadie, both former BNP officials expelled in 2009. Sadie, a former primary school teacher, left the profession in 2021 due to her anti-vaccine activism and participation in anti-lockdown protests. The group's co-founder was Katy-Jo Murfin, an actress and anti-vaccine activist. Mike Fairclough, a former headteacher of West Rise Junior School, sent his children to the centre and gave talks. He resigned as headteacher in 2023 after his links to Hope Sussex were revealed by Tom Ball of The Times.

== Activities and gatherings ==
40 families use Hope Sussex's facilities and 20 primary-aged children attend full-time. It provides a curriculum covering core subjects like English, maths, and science, but through a conspiratorial lens, alongside skills such as foraging, welding, shamanism, and survivalism. Practical activities include making slingshots, bullet casing necklaces and nunchucks, as well as weapons training: children as young as four are taught to shoot air rifles and practise archery. Science sessions have involved demonstrations with homemade flamethrowers and explosives.

Notable gatherings include the "Freedom music festival" featuring performers like Right Said Fred and DJ Danny Rampling. It has participated in the Sounds Beautiful festival in Dorset, with talks on anti-vaccination, flat Earth, and anti-5G topics. In 2024, it hosted two shows by far-right commentator Katie Hopkins at its pub. Plans for a road trip to Moscow with pupils were reported in 2023. During a trip to Budapest, pupils visited a shooting range and were photographed holding submachine guns.

== Conspiracy theories ==
Education at Hope Sussex has promotes conspiracy narratives, including claims that the attack on Pearl Harbor and the September 11 attacks involved prior government knowledge or orchestration, as well as instruction on preparing for societal collapse. It emphasises anti-vaccination, anti-lockdown and anti-globalist views, portraying the state as totalitarian and indoctrinating. Hosted speakers include the conspiracy theorists David Icke and Kate Shemirani. Matthew Single has expressed admiration for figures like Vladimir Putin and Kim Jong-un, and described the community as an "army" resisting government threats.
