= Health Protection (Coronavirus, Wearing of Face Coverings) (England) Regulations 2021 =

United Kingdom emergency legislation

- Statutory Instrument
- Parliament of the United Kingdom
- Citation: SI 2021/1340
- Introduced by: Sajid Javid, Secretary of State for Health and Social Care
- Territorial extent: England

Dates
- Made: 29 November 2021
- Laid before Parliament: 29 November 2021
- Commencement: 30 November 2021
- Expired: 26 January 2022

Other legislation
- Made under: Public Health (Control of Disease) Act 1984

Status: Expired

Text of the Health Protection (Coronavirus, Wearing of Face Coverings) (England) Regulations 2021 as in force today (including any amendments) within the United Kingdom, from legislation.gov.uk.

The Health Protection (Coronavirus, Wearing of Face Coverings) (England) Regulations 2021 (SI 2021/1340) is a statutory instrument (SI) made by the Secretary of State for Health and Social Care in response to the Omicron variant during the COVID-19 pandemic. The regulations were similar to previous face covering regulations that had been revoked in July 2021. Subject to some exceptions, they required members of the public in England to wear a face covering on public transport and in most indoor shops between 30 November 2021 and 26 January 2022.

== Legal basis ==
The regulations were introduced by way of a statutory instrument made by the Secretary of State for Health and Social Care using emergency powers available under the Public Health (Control of Disease) Act 1984. The regulations themselves stated the legal basis for using such powers, namely "the serious and imminent threat to public health which is posed by the incidence and spread of severe acute respiratory syndrome coronavirus 2 (SARS-CoV-2) in England"; the restrictions were said to be "proportionate to what they seek to achieve, which is a public health response to the threat."

The regulations were made and laid before parliament on 29 November 2021, and came into force the next day. The Secretary of State used section 45R of the Public Health (Control of Disease) Act 1984 to enact the regulations without prior parliamentary consideration, subject to retrospective approval by resolution of each House of Parliament within twenty-eight days.

== Geographical scope ==
The regulations applied in England only (the rules were different in Scotland, Wales and Northern Ireland).

== Face coverings ==
Any type of face covering was considered acceptable under the regulations, provided that it covered the wearer's nose and mouth; there was no requirement to wear a 'mask'.

== Requirement to wear a face covering in a relevant place ==
Subject to some exceptions, nobody was allowed – unless they had "reasonable excuse" – to enter or remain in a "relevant place" without wearing a face covering. The definition of "relevant place" changed over time, as follows:

| Dates | "Relevant place": all indoor premises or areas | Places excluded from definition (no face covering needed) | Gatherings in community premises (no face covering needed) |
|---|---|---|---|
| Between 30 Nov and 10 Dec 2021 | Shops open to the public for sale or hire of goods or services; enclosed shopping centres; banks, building societies and the like; post offices; transport hubs; some motor vehicles during a driving lesson or test | Restaurants, bars, pubs, clubs; areas that are wholly or mainly for eating or drinking (but only while actively in use); premises (apart from pharmacies) offering medical or dental services or the like; photography studios | – |
| Between 10 Dec 2021 and 26 Jan 2022 | Shops; enclosed shopping centres; banks, building societies and the like; post offices; public places of worship; crematoria and chapels; community and youth centres, members’ and social clubs; public areas in hotels and hostels; public halls including concert and exhibition halls, conference centres; cinemas; museums, galleries, aquariums, zoos, visitor farms, and other tourist, heritage or cultural sites; bingo halls; public libraries and reading rooms; casinos; theatres; polling stations and vote-counting premises; play and soft play areas; snooker and pool halls; amusement arcades; games and recreation venues; skating rinks; circuses; theme parks, fairgrounds, funfairs, and adventure parks; sports stadia; some motor vehicles during a driving lesson or test; motorway service areas; sexual entertainment venues | Restaurants, cafes, bars, pubs, clubs; areas wholly or mainly for eating or drinking (but only while actively in use); fitness studios and gyms; dance studios; leisure centres; swimming pools or water or aqua parks; areas wholly or mainly for exercise or dancing (but only while actively in use); premises (apart from pharmacies) offering medical or dental services or the like; photography studios; nightclubs; dance halls and discos; any other venue with a dance floor and music opening at night | Many educational activities; work experience, applying for and obtaining work; where required for work purposes (other than driving instruction or tests); professional training; most exams; formally-organised parent and child groups; registered childcare; organised and supervised activities for children |

=== Exceptions ===
The "relevant place" requirements did not apply to children under 11, to workers who were unlikely to come into close contact with the public, or to police or emergency responders.

From 10 December 2021, exemptions were also provided for elite sportspeople, coaches, referees, professional dancers, choreographers and performers, but only while undertaking their respective activities. Also exempted were couples being married.

== Requirement to wear a face covering on public transport ==
Subject to some exceptions, nobody was allowed – unless they had a "reasonable excuse" – to board or to be on board a public transport vehicle without wearing a face covering.

=== Exceptions ===
The public transport requirements did not apply to children under 11, to public transport workers, or to police or emergency responders. There was also no requirement to wear a face covering where the public transport vehicle had no roof or where the person was in a private cabin or berth. No covering was needed for passengers who were being transported within their own private vehicle.

From 10 December 2021, an exemption was also provided for performers on public transport performing in the course of their employment or in the course of providing their service.

== Reasonable excuse ==
The regulations provided a list of excuses for not wearing a face covering which were considered to be "reasonable", while not excluding other possibilities:

- person unable to comply due to a disability, or where it would cause severe distress
- to facilitate lip reading
- to avoid the risk of harm or to receive medical treatment
- where a person avoiding injury or escaping a risk of harm had no covering with them
- where reasonably necessary to eat, drink or take medication
- where instructed to do so by an official
- where requested in a pharmacy.

From 10 December 2021, a further excuse was added: where it was reasonably necessary to sing as part of a choir, or during a service, rehearsal or performance.

== Signage ==
Those responsible for premises and for public transport services were required to inform customers, for example by displaying a notice, that face coverings had to be worn unless an exception applied or the customer has reasonable excuse.

== No prevention ==
Businesses were not permitted to prevent or seek to prevent the wearing of face coverings on their premises. Doing so without reasonable excuse was an offence.

== Offences and enforcement ==
It was a criminal offence to contravene the regulations, and offenders could be prosecuted or issued with fixed penalty notices of up to £6400. Both police officers and some other officials had the power to deny access to a "relevant place" and to public transport to anyone not wearing a face covering.

== Expiry ==
The regulations were originally set to expire at the end of 20 December 2021, later extended to the end of 26 January 2022. On 19 January, the prime minister Boris Johnson told the House of Commons that they would not be further extended and would expire as scheduled on 26 January 2022, which they duly did.

== Guidelines and external topics ==
Official Government guidelines published on the day that the regulations came into force set out situations in which face coverings were said to be 'required', but used different terminology. For example the guidance specified mandatory face coverings in premises providing personal care and beauty treatments, estate agents, auction houses, premises providing veterinary services, and takeaways without space for consumption of food or drink on premises.

== See also ==
- Health Protection (Coronavirus, Wearing of Face Coverings on Public Transport) (England) Regulations 2020
- Health Protection (Coronavirus, Wearing of Face Coverings in a Relevant Place) (England) Regulations 2020

== Bibliography ==
- "SI 1340". Legislation.gov.uk. 30 November 2021. The Health Protection (Coronavirus, Wearing of Face Coverings) (England) Regulations 2021.
- "SI 1400". Legislation.gov.uk. 10 December 2021. The Health Protection (Coronavirus, Wearing of Face Coverings) (England) (Amendment) Regulations 2021.
