= Piers Corbyn =

British political activist (born 1947)

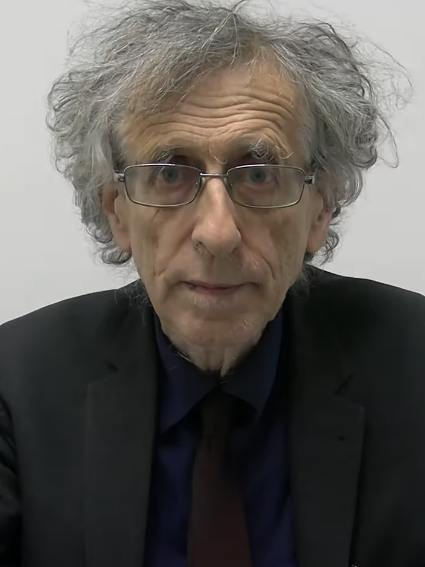
- Corbyn in 2020
- Born: Piers Richard Corbyn; 10 March 1947 (age 79); Chippenham, Wiltshire, England
- Occupations: Weather forecaster; businessman; anti-vaccination activist
- Political party: Independent (2003–2021, 2023–2025, 2026–present)
- Other political affiliations: Your Party (2025–2026); Let London Live (2021–2023); Labour (until 2003)
- Relatives: Jeremy Corbyn (brother)

Academic background
- Education: Castle House School; Adams' Grammar School
- Alma mater: Imperial College London; Queen Mary University of London

Piers Richard Corbyn (/ˈkɔːrbɪn/; born 10 March 1947) is a British weather forecaster, anti-vaccine activist, conspiracy theorist, and former politician. (Note: For the conspiracy theorist descriptor, see: Glastonbury 5G report 'hijacked by conspiracy theorists'. BBC News.; Anti-lockdown, anti-vaccine and anti-mask protesters crowd London's Trafalgar Square. The Independent.; Coronavirus protests: Jeremy Corbyn's brother among protesters arrested at Hyde Park 'mass gathering'. The Independent.; Piers Corbyn charged with breaching lockdown rules on two occasions. The Daily Telegraph.; Who is Jeremy Corbyn's brother Piers? Mask protests, climate denial and support for a no-deal Brexit. The Daily Telegraph) Corbyn was born in Wiltshire and raised in Shropshire wherein he attended Adams' Grammar School. He was awarded a first class BSc degree in physics from Imperial College London in 1968 and a postgraduate MSc in astrophysics from Queen Mary College, University of London, in 1981. Corbyn was a member of the Labour Party and served as a councillor in the London Borough of Southwark from 1986 to 1990. He is the elder brother of former Labour Party leader Jeremy Corbyn, leaving Labour in 2003 due to his opposition to the Iraq War.

Corbyn ran a weather monitoring company called WeatherAction in the 1990s and gained some prominence in the media for his predictions and, later more so, for his rejection of the scientific consensus on climate change.

Throughout the COVID-19 pandemic, he was a prominent proponent of conspiracy theories. He described SARS-CoV-2 as a "hoax", frequently campaigned against lockdowns and against COVID-19 vaccines, and described COVID-19 vaccines as dangerous. Corbyn was arrested on several occasions for taking part in protests against public health laws, and on suspicion of encouraging people to burn down the offices of members of Parliament.

== Early life and education ==
Piers Corbyn was born on 10 March 1947 in Chippenham, Wiltshire. He grew up at Yew Tree Manor in Pave Lane, in Newport, Shropshire, a 17th-century country house which was once part of the Duke of Sutherland's Lilleshall estate. He began recording weather and climate patterns in 1962 at the age of fifteen, constructing his own observation equipment. He attended Castle House School and Adams' Grammar School in Newport, Shropshire.

=== Higher education ===
At 18, he went to Imperial College London, being awarded a first class BSc degree in physics in 1968. He commenced postgraduate research there into superconductivity, but then went into student representation and politics for some years. In 1979, he returned to postgraduate study at Queen Mary College, University of London, being awarded an MSc in astrophysics in 1981. While he was an undergraduate, an article by Corbyn was published in the Royal Meteorological Society's magazine Weather discussing a brine barometer and an electrical thermometer.

=== Student representative ===
In 1969, Corbyn became the first president of the Imperial College Students' Union to be directly elected by the student body. As president until 1970, Corbyn was successful in establishing a sabbatical union president, enabling the elected student leader to be registered at the college without having to study or pay fees (in fact they received a grant from the college and union).

Corbyn set up a short-lived Imperial College Representative Council, seats on which were distributed between members of the college on the basis of their numbers, a system that almost gave students a majority. The ICAUT, a staff union, refused to cooperate with this student-led initiative. Although this particular council did not survive, increased student representation on college boards and committees became a lasting success of Corbyn's time as ICU president.

Corbyn, together with the rector at the time, Lord Penney, received the Queen when she opened a new administrative building in 1969. During the visit Corbyn petitioned the Queen in front of 900 people, asking for students to be given greater say in the governance of the college.

== Career ==
=== Housing-rights activist ===
Corbyn was a housing and squatters' rights activist in the north Paddington area of the City of Westminster in the mid-1970s. He helped organise the All London Squatters Federation, the squatters union and the Squatters Action Council (SAC). Although they issued publications and mounted protests, in the assessment of the Metropolitan Police Special Branch the "real activists" in these organisations, Corbyn among them, were "limited to not more than about a dozen persons" and had "very little influence on squatters".

In 1974, he stood for election to Westminster City Council in Harrow Road ward as a Squatters and Tenants candidate; in 1978, he and a colleague stood in Harrow Road as Decent Housing candidates. In the 1977 GLC election he was the International Marxist Group candidate for Lambeth Central.

He and some of the squatters in Elgin Avenue were, as a result of their campaign which included the building of barricades against eviction, rehoused by the GLC in 1975 spread out between Westminster and other London boroughs to discourage the risk of further united action. For their 3-year occupation, it was "a 'victory' of sorts", which Corbyn, attributed to three factors: (1) a public campaign that "related to the whole housing crisis" so that support was won from the labour movement; (2) democratic organisation so that "everyone could join in and know that what they did was part of what everyone was doing"; and (3) a readiness to "defy the law" proving that the residents were "serious and not squatting for fun".

In August 1978, Corbyn, then with the Advisory Service for Squatters (ASS), was present when 650 members of the Special Patrol Group cleared 160 squatters out of 5 blocks in Huntley Street, behind University College Hospital. Corbyn summarised the squatters case in the slogan "No [housing] waiting lists while homes lie empty". With Jim Paton of the ASS, he was convicted of "resisting the sheriff" contrary to Section 10 of the Criminal Law Act 1977. In solidarity, 150 Dutch squatters "besieged" at the British Embassy in The Hague.

=== Party politics ===
Corbyn was a member of the Labour Party. He was elected as a Labour councillor for Burgess Ward of the Southwark London Borough Council in 1986 but lost in 1990. In 1987, Corbyn was arrested for the defacing of an SDP–Liberal Alliance poster, but cautioned and released without charge. For seven years he was an unpaid campaigns organiser in Southwark and Bermondsey, being thanked by Tony Blair in 1998 at Downing Street. Corbyn left the Labour Party in 2002 in the run up to the invasion of Iraq, and stood as an independent candidate in 2002 and in a 2015 council by-election. According to The Sunday Times in September 2017, his attempt to rejoin the Southwark Constituency Labour Party in January 2017 was blocked.

His brother, Jeremy Corbyn, was elected MP for Islington North in 1983, was re-elected in every following election as of 2025, and served as Leader of the Labour Party and hence Leader of the Opposition from 2015 to 2020. In August 2015, Corbyn supported his brother's campaign in the Labour Party leadership election, on the basis that he stood for proper debate and accountability, including on climate. On Twitter, he urged people to register to vote and back Jeremy Corbyn to lead the Labour Party.

In March 2016, Corbyn was among a group of protesters at a Lambeth council meeting who reportedly "screamed abuse in the faces" of party councillors. Corbyn later told the BBC that he personally sought to make his points by talking to people, rather than shouting.

=== WeatherAction ===
Following some years of weather prediction as an occupation, he formed WeatherAction, a business, in 1995. WeatherAction is the business through which Corbyn sells his predictions. He has in the past bet on these predictions. His betting attracted much interest in 1990, when his predictions of severe weather were met by a year of the "worst extremes".

WeatherAction was formerly listed company on the Alternative Investment Market (AIM) as 'Weather Action Holdings plc' in 1997, and was transferred back to private ownership in 1999, primarily because of sustaining increasing losses and the impact of annual £70,000 costs related to listed status on annual revenues of £250,000. Corbyn reacquired the weather prediction business; the listed shell was taken over by investors and changed its name to 'InternetAction.com', with the intent of researching potential net-based takeover targets.

WeatherAction left the Alternative Investment Market in 1999 after reported losses of £480,000 incurred during its time as a public company; its share price dropped from 79p a share to 24p.

==== Prediction methods ====
Corbyn's technique is stated to combine "statistical analysis of over a century of historical weather patterns with clues derived from solar observations." He considers past weather patterns and solar observations and sun-earth magnetic connectivity. However, meteorological studies show that such influences cause minimal impact on the Earth's atmosphere.

==== Scientific review ====
The only study involving Corbyn's work published in a peer-reviewed journal was in the Journal of Atmospheric and Solar-Terrestrial Physics (2001). Its investigation was limited to Corbyn's "likely damaging gale periods" predictions for the island of Great Britain for the period October 1995 – September 1997. Corbyn's enlisted work (carried out for a consortium of insurance companies) was only for the most likely periods of the strongest winds and specifically not a full forecast to include lesser winds:

Forecasts prepared by WeatherAction would repay further attention. The results provide little evidence to dismiss the observed success rates as being attributable to mere chance or good fortune. Indeed the balance of evidence indicates that the system performs better than chance although it is recognized that the margin of success differs greatly between the seasons and is lowest in winter when gales are most frequent.
This analysis has been wholly empirical in nature, seeking only to establish the success levels of the gale forecasts. Other aspects of the forecasts have not been considered in this evaluation. Inevitably however these results draw into the debate questions surrounding the methodology by which the forecasts are prepared. This is not, however, the arena in which such issues should be taken up.

In a 1999 edition of Wired magazine, researchers Ian Jolliffe and Nils Jolliffe stated of Corbyn's predictions that: "It is unusual for most of the detail to be completely correct, but equally it is rare for nearly everything to be wrong… Some forecasts are clearly very good, and a few are very poor, but the majority fall in the grey area in between, where an optimistic assessor would find merit, but a critical assessor would find fault."

In a 2012 article in Wired titled "The Fraudulent Business of Earthquake and Eruption Prediction", Erik Klemetti, an assistant professor of Geosciences at Ohio's Denison University accused Corbyn of "cherry-picking" and said people who claimed to be able to forecast earthquakes were "faith healers of the geologic community and should be seen as such."

==== Media coverage ====
Critics have pointed to inaccurate predictions, such as a white Easter in 1989, and "raging weather" in September 1997. WeatherAction predictions were contested by the Met Office in 2008.

While he was Mayor of London, Boris Johnson repeatedly suggested that Corbyn might be correct in his denial of anthropogenic climate change.

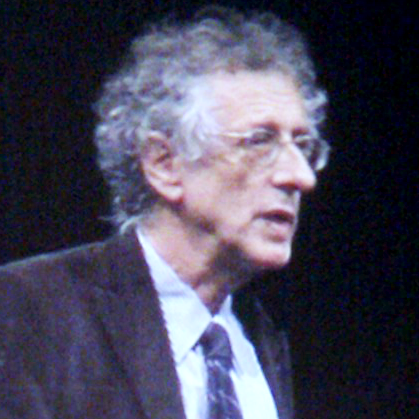
Corbyn speaking at a 2011 El Ser Creativo event

=== Let London Live ===
In January 2021, it was announced that Corbyn would stand for his own party, Let London Live, in the 2021 London mayoral election and 2021 London Assembly election. On 19 April, Corbyn told the BBC that if he were to be elected then he would "end lockdown on day one as mayor". He finished 11th with 20,604 votes (0.8%) in the mayoral election, while his party finished 12th on the London-wide list with 15,755 votes. He stood for Let London Live in the 2022 Southwark London Borough Council election.

He stood as a candidate in the 2023 Uxbridge and South Ruislip by-election for Let London Live; Corbyn finished 11th of 17 candidates, receiving 101 votes (0.3%).

Let London Live was deregistered as a political party in November 2023.

As an independent he stood in Bermondsey and Old Southwark constituency in the 2024 general election; he received 403 votes (1.1%).

In 2025 it was announced he had joined Your Party which had been co-founded by his brother earlier that year. In 2026 Piers Corbyn stood for the Central Executive Committee of Your Party in the London region. He was not elected coming 10th out of 13 candidates.

== Promotion of conspiracy theories ==
In 2020, Corbyn was reported by Hope not Hate and the Community Security Trust to have attended a meeting organised by Keep Talking, a conspiracy theory discussion group based in the United Kingdom which has invited on occasion guest speakers involved in Holocaust denial.

=== Climate change denial ===
Corbyn rejects the scientific consensus on climate change. He denies that humans play a role in climate change, and spreads false and discredited narratives about the issue. He has said that the media, Met Office and "corrupt scientists" are brainwashing the public as part of a Qatar-run conspiracy to keep oil prices high.

Corbyn has stated his belief that the anthropogenic contribution to global warming is minimal, with any increase in temperature due to increased solar activity. In 2009 he attended the International Conference on Climate Change organised by the Heartland Institute.

Corbyn featured in a Channel 4 documentary The Great Global Warming Swindle in 2007; a scientifically reviewed complaint to Ofcom noted that he was introduced as 'Dr Piers Corbyn, Climate Forecaster' despite not having a doctorate nor any qualification specifically in climate science or environmental science. In a 2016 interview Corbyn suggested that Margaret Thatcher endorsed the idea of man-made climate change as a strategy for phasing out the British coal industry and defeating the miners union in the 1984–85 miners' strike. However, there is no evidence that Thatcher used environmental arguments about climate change at the time; her support for climate change policies did not start until later in the 1980s.

In 2015, BBC Radio 4 apologised for an "unfortunate lapse" in a documentary presented by Daily Mail journalist Quentin Letts, which featured Corbyn in a critique of the Met Office's views on climate change while failing to mention the scientific consensus.

In March 2016, Corbyn participated in a BBC climate change debate which resulted in several people complaining to the BBC for giving him airtime.

He was interviewed by Dutch filmmaker Marijn Poels for his 2017 documentary feature film about climate, energy and agriculture, called The Uncertainty Has Settled.

In April 2019, Corbyn tweeted about the Swedish environmental activist Greta Thunberg with an image of her next to a Nazi swastika, describing her as an "ignorant, brainwashed child".

In April 2023 Corbyn was removed from an Extinction Rebellion church service in London after gatecrashing the event and telling environmental activists that man-made climate change "does not exist" and that they were "working for the Devil". The crowd, which had gathered for a service titled "No Faith in Fossil Fuels", began to sing the hymn "Amazing Grace" as he was escorted away.

=== COVID-19 denial ===
Corbyn has stated his belief that COVID-19 and the associated ongoing pandemic is a "hoax". On Twitter on 16 March 2020, he tweeted from an account that was later suspended an unfounded conspiracy theory that Bill Gates, George Soros and others had created the pandemic, that this was to mass vaccinate the world's population, and that vaccines are dangerous. He called the pandemic a "psychological operation to close down the economy in the interests of mega-corporations" on Good Morning Britain; Dr. Hilary Jones described his views as spurious and "extremely dangerous" and hosts Piers Morgan and Susanna Reid challenged him during the programme.

==== 2020 ====
On 16 May 2020, Corbyn was one of 19 people arrested for refusing to leave and failing to provide details whilst protesting against the UK's COVID-19 lockdown in Hyde Park, London. On this occasion, he advocated coronavirus-related 5G conspiracy theories and anti-vaccination claims before being arrested.

On 30 May, Corbyn attended another protest at Hyde Park, and was again charged with, as described in The Independent, "contravening coronavirus rules".

On 29 August, Corbyn was arrested by the Metropolitan Police near Trafalgar Square and warned he would be issued with a fixed penalty notice (FPN) for £10,000, on suspicion of breaking new Health Protection Regulations (2020) for the offence of holding a gathering of more than 30 people in an outdoor place. He appeared alongside conspiracy theorist David Icke and singer Chico Slimani. Corbyn was fined £10,000 for organising an anti-lockdown rally in Trafalgar Square, London.

On 5 September, Corbyn attended and helped to organise an anti-lockdown rally organised by StandUpX Mission in Sheffield. During the rally he argued: that the lockdown was taking place so the British government can "end your rights and freedom, to control you"; that the shift to mass vaccination was dangerous; and that the British government have a hidden agenda. At the end of the rally, Corbyn was arrested and charged with three offences under the Health Protection (Coronavirus) Regulations 2020. The charges were later dropped.

On 6 September, Corbyn invited Sadiq Khan to permit a rally in Trafalgar Square London at noon on 26 September, and he invited MPs of any party to speak from the podium at the London rally. On 18 September, Corbyn spoke at a rally in Cornwall against the use of face masks to protect against COVID-19, and described all politicians as liars. On 24 September, Corbyn was one of the main speakers at an anti-mask rally in Norwich. On 26 September, Corbyn attended a rally in Leeds and repeated the claims he had made in Cornwall. By mid-September, Corbyn had been blamed for a split among conspiracy theorists promoting misinformation about COVID-19, with Kate Shemirani and Mark Steele no longer sharing platforms with Corbyn and David Icke.

On 3 October, Corbyn attended and spoke at an anti-lockdown protest at Old Market Square in Nottingham. On 9 October, Corbyn attended an anti-lockdown event in Oxford. On 11 October, Corbyn attended an anti-lockdown protest outside the Welsh Parliament in Cardiff. He expressed his opposition to masks and told protesters to "free your face". On 14 October, Corbyn was the leader of an anti-lockdown protest in Sheffield. During his speech at the protest, he called for supporters to disobey public health restrictions. He described the British Parliament as a "brainwashing institution" that was full of "fake scientists" who are "paid liars".

On 14 October, Corbyn attended an anti-lockdown protest in Bristol which was organised by the conspiracy theory group Stand UpX. He was one of fourteen people who were arrested for breaching new laws on assembly during the pandemic.

On 16 October, Corbyn attended a demonstration in Soho, London, against the 10 pm pub curfew. He said: "We're here to drink against the curfew. To oppose the lockdowns, to oppose job losses caused by lockdowns, to oppose all of it. The whole lot should be lifted now."

On 17 October, Corbyn attended an anti-lockdown protest through Hyde Park and Oxford Street in London. Corbyn said to the crowd "Bill Gates wants vaccinations to control you and to control women's fertility to reduce world population".

On 18 October, Corbyn attended an anti-lockdown protest in Clayton Square, Liverpool City Centre. In a speech to protesters, he denied the existence of COVID-19, also suggested it was a bioweapon, and said "it was used to unleash the most monstrous power-grab the world has ever seen".

On 24 October, Corbyn attended an anti-lockdown protest by Save Our Rights UK using the slogan "Stop The New Normal" in London. The police determined that the protesters were not adhering to the coronavirus rules and decided to break up the protest. At least 18 people were arrested during the protest.

Corbyn was due to appear at Westminster Magistrates' Court on 17 November 2020 for breaching coronavirus rules on 16 and 30 May 2020. He was due to stand trial on 23 October 2020, but late disclosure of police logbooks delayed the proceedings. Corbyn's barrister told the court that he was "specifically targeted" by the police. Corbyn spoke outside of the court before the hearing on 23 October 2020: "Whatever happens, if they impose a fine, I will not pay the fine. I'm not going to pay any fines for these anti-just, illegal laws".

Corbyn initiated and conceptualised an anti-vaccination leaflet which was distributed in Barnet and other areas of North London in December 2020 and Southwark in January 2021 comparing the Covid vaccine campaign to the Holocaust. The leaflet had a drawing of the entrance to the Auschwitz concentration camp in which the Nazis' slogan Arbeit macht frei ("Work sets you free") had been altered to read "Vaccines are safe path to freedom." Corbyn denied the accusation of antisemitism, saying, "I was married for 22 years to a Jewess and obviously her mother's forebears fled the Baltic states just before the war because of Hitler or the Nazis in general. I've worked with Jewish leading world scientists over the last 30 years. I've also employed Jewish people in my business Weather Action, one of whom was a superb worker".

==== 2021 ====
During a voluntary visit to a London police station, Corbyn was arrested on 3 February 2021 on suspicion of malicious communications and public nuisance in connection with the leaflet; he was released on bail until early March, along with a man aged 37. Corbyn was arrested again at a protest in Fulham, West London on 27 February. In the meantime, he claimed to Sky News via email that, while he accepted the existence of COVID-19, he spuriously compared it to flu, contradicting his leaflet's claim that COVID does not exist, as well as denying that there was a pandemic. On 1 March the Metropolitan Police reported that Corbyn had been charged along with Kate Shemirani for a series of breaches of the UK Coronavirus regulations.

In June, the police began investigating Corbyn after they became aware of a video that surfaced online of him removing public health signs informing people to maintain social distance and to wear a face mask on a London Underground train.

On 10 July, Corbyn and other anti-lockdown protesters staged a protest outside a vaccine centre bus in Brighton and Hove, which subsequently caused the NHS Brighton and Hove CCG to announce that they had to cancel some vaccine jabs because of "disruption during the anti-lockdown measures protest in the city". The protest was condemned by the Brighton and Hove council leader Phelim Mac Cafferty, who said, "It is incredibly disappointing to see the irresponsible actions of a few putting in danger the many."

On 20 July, Corbyn attended and spoke at a protest outside the Labour Party's headquarters opposing the expulsion of Labour Party members who had been accused of antisemitism. He said that he was "100 per cent" behind "those being purged from the Labour Party". During his speech, Corbyn said that complying with the government's vaccine rollout was the same as the German people submitting to Nazi rule, stating, "You know what happened in Germany... they believed in Hitler. You know what happened, the rest is history". Corbyn's attendance at the protest was not welcomed by everyone present at the protest, and some of the protesters distanced themselves from him due to his COVID-19 denial.

In July, YouTube pranksters Josh Pieters and Archie Manners, posing as AstraZeneca investors, met Corbyn and offered him £10,000 under the condition that he would stop criticising the AstraZeneca vaccine. In reality, Corbyn received Monopoly board game money. The pranksters told LBC when asked whether they feel sorry for Corbyn that they feel more sorry for "those he's conning".

Corbyn was present at an anti-vaxxer demonstration on 9 August outside BBC's Television Centre in London (protesters falsely assumed it was still a major BBC facility) and outside the ITN building on Gray's Inn Road on 23 August 2021.

In September 2021, Corbyn staged a protest outside the Old Bailey in London, on the day former Metropolitan Police officer Wayne Couzens was being sentenced for the murder of Sarah Everard. Corbyn said the fact that Couzens showed Everard his police warrant card and claimed to be arresting her for breaches of the UK's lockdown regulations to kidnap her was evidence that coronavirus laws were "not about controlling a virus" but instead "about controlling the public". The protest was widely seen as inappropriate given the highly disturbing and emotive nature of the Everard murder, and a passerby approached Corbyn shouting "How dare you hijack Sarah's death for your own cause?".

Corbyn attended another large demonstration against the UK government's proposed COVID restrictions on 18 December 2021 in Parliament Square. There, he featured in another music video, this time alongside rapper Remeece, in which they walk through crowds of protestors whilst repeatedly calling for viewers to refuse to take the COVID-19 vaccine. In a later speech at the demonstration, Corbyn's comments on these proposals to enforce guidelines to combat the spread of the Omicron variant of the virus were met with widespread backlash. He had urged the crowd "to hammer to death those scum, those scum who have decided to go ahead with introducing new fascism", as well as suggesting that the offices of MPs who had voted for the restrictions should be burned down. Home Secretary Priti Patel responded to online footage of Corbyn's speech, describing it as "sickening" and called for the police to take action against him. On 19 December, Corbyn was arrested for his comments.

== See also ==
- Protests over responses to the COVID-19 pandemic § United Kingdom
