= Health Protection (Coronavirus, Restrictions) (Local Authority Enforcement Powers and Amendment) (England) Regulations 2020 =

United Kingdom emergency legislation

- Statutory Instrument
- Parliament of the United Kingdom
- Citation: SI 2020/1375
- Introduced by: Matt Hancock, Secretary of State for Health and Social Care
- Territorial extent: England

Dates
- Made: 30 November 2020
- Commencement: 2 December 2020
- Expired: 30 November 2020
- Revoked: 18 July 2021

Other legislation
- Made under: Public Health (Control of Disease) Act 1984
- Revoked by: Health Protection (Coronavirus, Restrictions) (Steps etc.) (England) (Revocation and Amendment) Regulations 2021

Status: Revoked

Text of statute as originally enacted

The Health Protection (Coronavirus, Restrictions) (Local Authority Enforcement Powers and Amendment) (England) Regulations 2020 (SI 2020/1375) is an English statutory instrument that empowered local authority officers to issue legally-binding notices to anyone found to be contravening one of the emergency coronavirus provisions. Notices could require remedial action and the closure of premises. Failure to comply was an offence, and could be dealt with by the courts or by issuance of a fixed penalty notice.

The regulations came into effect in England on 2 December 2020 and were revoked on 18 July 2021.

== Legal basis ==
The regulations were made on 30 November 2020 by the Secretary of State for Health and Social Care, Matt Hancock, using emergency powers under the Public Health (Control of Disease) Act 1984, the stated legal basis being "the serious and imminent threat to public health which is posed by the incidence and spread of severe acute respiratory syndrome coronavirus 2 (SARS-CoV-2) in England". Hancock used section 45R of the Public Health (Control of Disease) Act 1984 to enact the regulations without prior parliamentary consideration, subject to retrospective approval by resolution of each House of Parliament within twenty-eight days.

== Coronavirus improvement notices ==
A local authority designated officer could issue a coronavirus improvement notice to anyone who was contravening one of the emergency coronavirus provisions (but not in respect of any essential infrastructure). Any such notice had to be "necessary and appropriate" and was required to include a specified list of information, including details of the alleged contravention, what had to be done to remedy it, and the remedial period allowed (at least 48 hours).

The notice had to be reviewed by the local authority as soon as practicable after the end of the period specified, or earlier if the recipient stated that the requirements have been satisfied. The local authority then either had to withdraw the notice or notify the person of their right of appeal.

== Coronavirus immediate restriction notices ==
A local authority designated officer could issue a coronavirus immediate restriction notice to anyone who was contravening one of the emergency coronavirus provisions and where contravention was likely to continue or to be repeated (but not in respect of any essential infrastructure). Any such notice had to be "necessary and appropriate" and had to include a specified list of information, including details of the alleged contravention and a statement that failure to comply with the notice was a criminal offence.

The notice had to require either or both of the following, and could take effect immediately or after a specified period:

- that the relevant premises be closed
- that the person must end the contravention and ensure that it is not repeated.

The notice remained in effect for 48 hours and had to be reviewed by the local authority before the end of that period, or earlier if the recipient stated that the requirements had been satisfied. The local authority then had to withdraw the notice, amend or re-issue it, or notify the person of their right of appeal.

== Coronavirus restriction notices ==
A local authority designated officer could issue a coronavirus restriction notice to anyone who had previously received a coronavirus improvement notice and had failed to comply with it (but not in respect of any essential infrastructure). Any such notice had to be "necessary and appropriate" and had to include a specified list of information, including details of the alleged non-compliance and a statement that failure to comply with the notice was a criminal offence.

The notice had to require either or both of the following, and could take effect immediately or after a specified period:

- that the relevant premises be closed
- that the person must end the contravention.

The notice remained in effect for seven days and had to be reviewed by the local authority before the end of that period, or earlier if the recipient stated that the requirements were no longer necessary. The local authority then had to withdraw the notice, amend or re-issue it, or notify the person of their right of appeal.

== Enforcement ==
It was a criminal offence to fail to comply with any of the above notices without reasonable excuse. Local authority officers were also empowered to issue fixed penalty notices.

== Appeals ==
Appeals against the issuance or a notice, or a decision on review, could be made to a magistrates' court.

== Amendments of other regulations ==
The regulations also amended a wide variety of other coronavirus statutory instruments.

== Revocation ==
The regulations were originally set to expire at the end of 2 June 2021, later changed to 20 June 2021. In the event, they were revoked on 18 July 2021 by the Health Protection (Coronavirus, Restrictions) (Steps etc.) (England) (Revocation and Amendment) Regulations 2021 (SI 2021/848).

== Bibliography ==
- "SI 1375". Legislation.gov.uk. 2 December 2020. The Health Protection (Coronavirus, Restrictions) (Local Authority Enforcement Powers and Amendment) (England) Regulations 2020.
- "SI 585". Legislation.gov.uk. 17 May 2021. The Health Protection (Coronavirus, Restrictions) (Steps and Other Provisions) (England) (Amendment) Regulations 2021.
- "SI 848". Legislation.gov.uk. 16 July 2021. The Health Protection (Coronavirus, Restrictions) (Steps etc.) (England) (Revocation and Amendment) Regulations 2021 (S.I. 2021/848).
