= The Uncertainty Has Settled =

- Directed by: Marijn Poels
- Screenplay by: Marijn Poels
- Produced by: Marijn Poels
- Cinematography: Volker M. Schmidt
- Edited by: Marijn Poels, Volker M. Schmidt
- Distributed by: Self-distributed
- Release date: 2 August 2017
- Running time: 90 minutes
- Country: Germany
- Language: English / Dutch / German

The Uncertainty Has Settled is a documentary about climate, energy and agriculture. Produced and directed by Dutch filmmaker Marijn Poels, the film was released in 2017.

The name of the film is an allusion to the assertion that "the science has settled", made by people such as Arnold Schwarzenegger and Al Gore.

In the film, Poels visits regular climate scientists, as well as individuals who reject climate science, and lets the viewer come to their own conclusions. Those visited include climate deniers Piers Corbyn, British astrophysicist and conspiracy theorist, and British/ American physicist Freeman Dyson.

The world premiere of the film took place on 9 February 2017 at the Berlin Independent Film Festival, screening at the historic Kino Babylon, where it won best documentary feature.

It also screened at the Mindfield Film Festival Los Angeles, where it won the Diamond Award for best documentary, and at the Paris Independent Film Festival, where it won best documentary feature.

The film was awarded as best documentary.
