= Mark Steele (conspiracy theorist) =

British conspiracy theorist

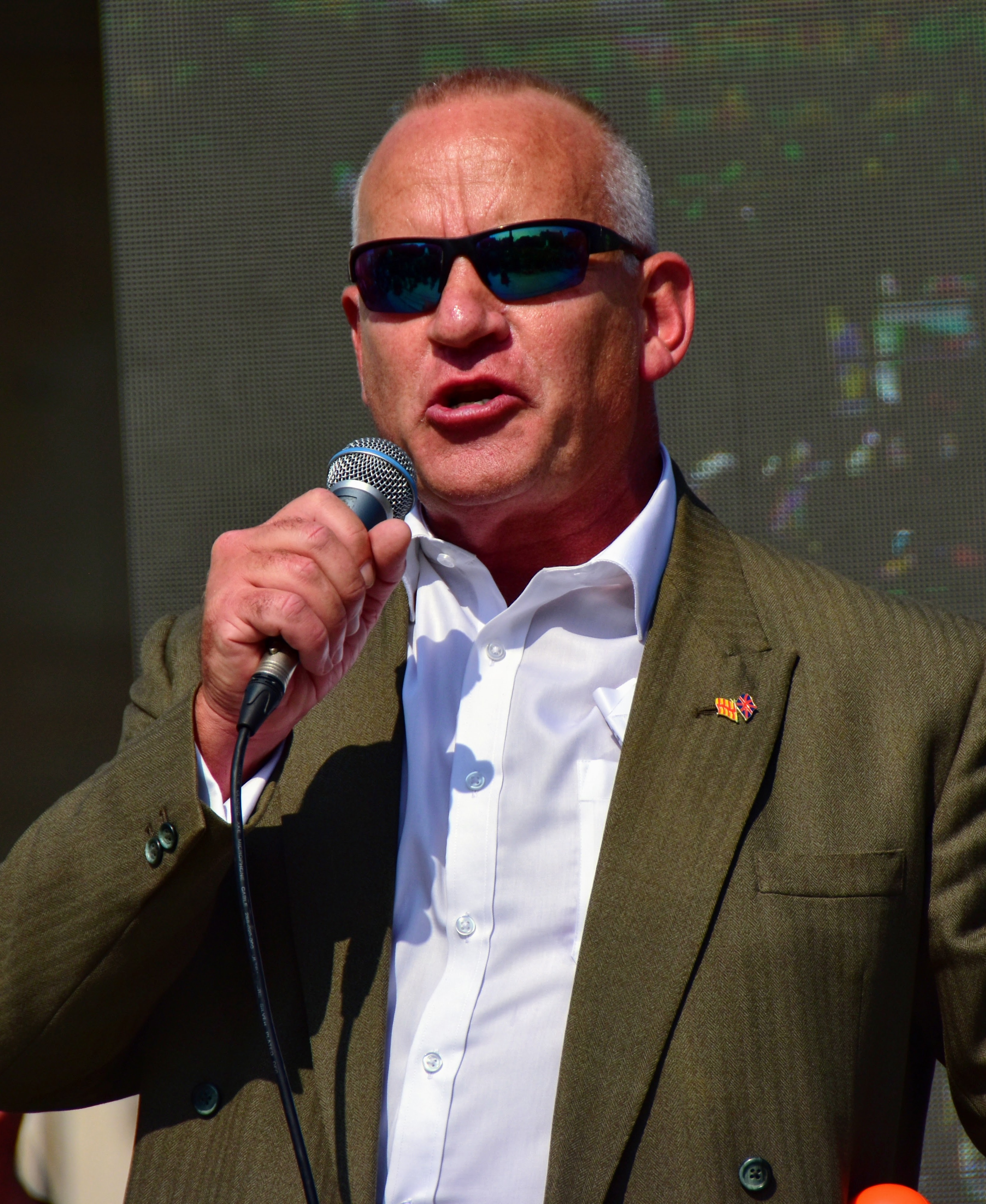
- Steele addressing a crowd at Trafalgar Square in London on 19 September 2020
- Born: 1960; Gateshead, England
- Occupation: Conspiracy theorist
- Political party: Save Us Now
- Criminal charges: Unlawful wounding, possession of a firearm with an intent to endanger life, illegal possession of ammunition
- Criminal penalty: 8 years
- Criminal status: Released

Mark Steele (born 1960) is a British conspiracy theorist who is best known for his videos alleging that 5G, WiFi and other communication networks are part of a distributed weapon system. He lives in Gateshead, England, which is the focus of much of his activism. Steele describes himself as a "weapons expert", claiming to have worked on undisclosed projects for the Ministry of Defence, and studied psychology and social sciences at the Open University.

== Promotion of conspiracy theories ==
=== 5G conspiracy theory ===
Steele claims that the 5G mobile phone network is a deadly technology, responsible for 400 deaths. According to Steele, the 5G network is part of a distributed "Kill Grid" which includes other street-furniture such as lamp-posts. He has repeated claims first disseminated by David Icke, that 5G networks are the cause of the COVID-19 pandemic.

In 2016, a neighbour informed Steele that she believed newly installed street lights to be the cause of her nose-bleeds. Steele became convinced that these lamp-posts housed components of a 5G network, despite the council's claims to the contrary, and that this was the cause of his neighbour's illness. Subsequently, Steele expanded on this theory, claiming that children were being "microwaved in their beds" by 5G.

In 2018, Steele addressed the Democrats and Veterans Party, on the subject of 5G technology. The video of his speech was widely shared on YouTube. In 2019, he spoke at the "5G Apocalypse event", organised by "Bali-based New Age influencer" Sacha Stone. BuzzFeed News and Vice News have reported that Steele and Stone used such events, as well as legal defence funds, to make money from their followers.

=== Gateshead council trial ===
Steele's activism has focused on Gateshead council, who he has claimed are "secretly trialling the technology, causing cancer and microwaving babies in their beds". Steele has described Gateshead councillors as “baby killers”, and has claimed that the installation of 5G equipment in Gateshead has destroyed the local sparrow population.

Gateshead council issued a statement that, contrary to Steele's claims, their street-lighting was not part of a "secret government trial", does not use any 5G mobile technology, and would not cause nosebleeds, miscarriages or cancer. Steele's claims were publicised by the Daily Mail, causing the story to go viral online.

In October 2018, Steele won a court case overturning a July 2018 "gagging order", which had previously prevented him from blogging his claims on his personal website, but was placed under an injunction to stop him harassing council staff and councillors. Later in October, Steele was convicted of having made threats against members of Gateshead council in April.

=== COVID-19 denialism and conspiracy theories ===
Steele has promoted conspiracy theories and misinformation linking the launch of 5G technology in Wuhan, China to the COVID-19 pandemic. Steele describes 5G as "genocide" carried out by "the deep state". When asked about links between 5G and coronavirus in April 2020, Steele told The New York Times: "It's looking a bit suspicious, don't you think?" The next month, Twitter began labelling Steele's posts about 5G and the pandemic as misinformation.

In September 2020, he spoke at an anti-lockdown rally in Glasgow.

On 19 September, Steele claimed that he has "raised tens of thousands" for the anti-mask and anti-lockdown causes, without any evidence to support his claim.

Steele and fellow anti-vaccine campaigner and conspiracy theorist Kate Shemirani have been described as "controlled opposition" by supporters of David Icke and Piers Corbyn, both of whom distanced themselves from a 19 September 2020 "Resist and Act for Freedom" protest hosted by Shemirani and backed by Steele.

== Shooting conviction ==
In 1993, Steele was convicted of the shooting of a teenage girl, who had been hit by a shot from a handgun fired by Steele during an argument outside the Redskins Pub, Washington, Tyne and Wear. Steele, who was working as a bouncer at the pub, claimed that he was concerned about his safety and brandished the weapon out of "bravado". In court, Steele admitted to unlawful wounding, possession of a firearm with an intent to endanger life and illegal possession of ammunition. Steele was sentenced to eight years' imprisonment. The bullet entered the victim's skull and she was left with serious disabilities. In January 2006, the Sunday Mail interviewed the victim, and stated she was able to walk again with the use of sticks.

== Political involvement ==
In 2019, he was photographed with a member of the English Defence League, a far-right, Islamophobic organisation.

== See also ==
- Protests over responses to the COVID-19 pandemic#United Kingdom
