= COVID-19 tier regulations in England =

COVID-19 tier regulations in England may refer to:

- First COVID-19 tier regulations in England, a set of English statutory instruments in effect from 14 October to 5 November 2020
- The Health Protection (Coronavirus, Restrictions) (All Tiers) (England) Regulations 2020, a different set of English statutory instruments in effect from 2 December 2020 to 29 March 2021
