= Marijn Poels =

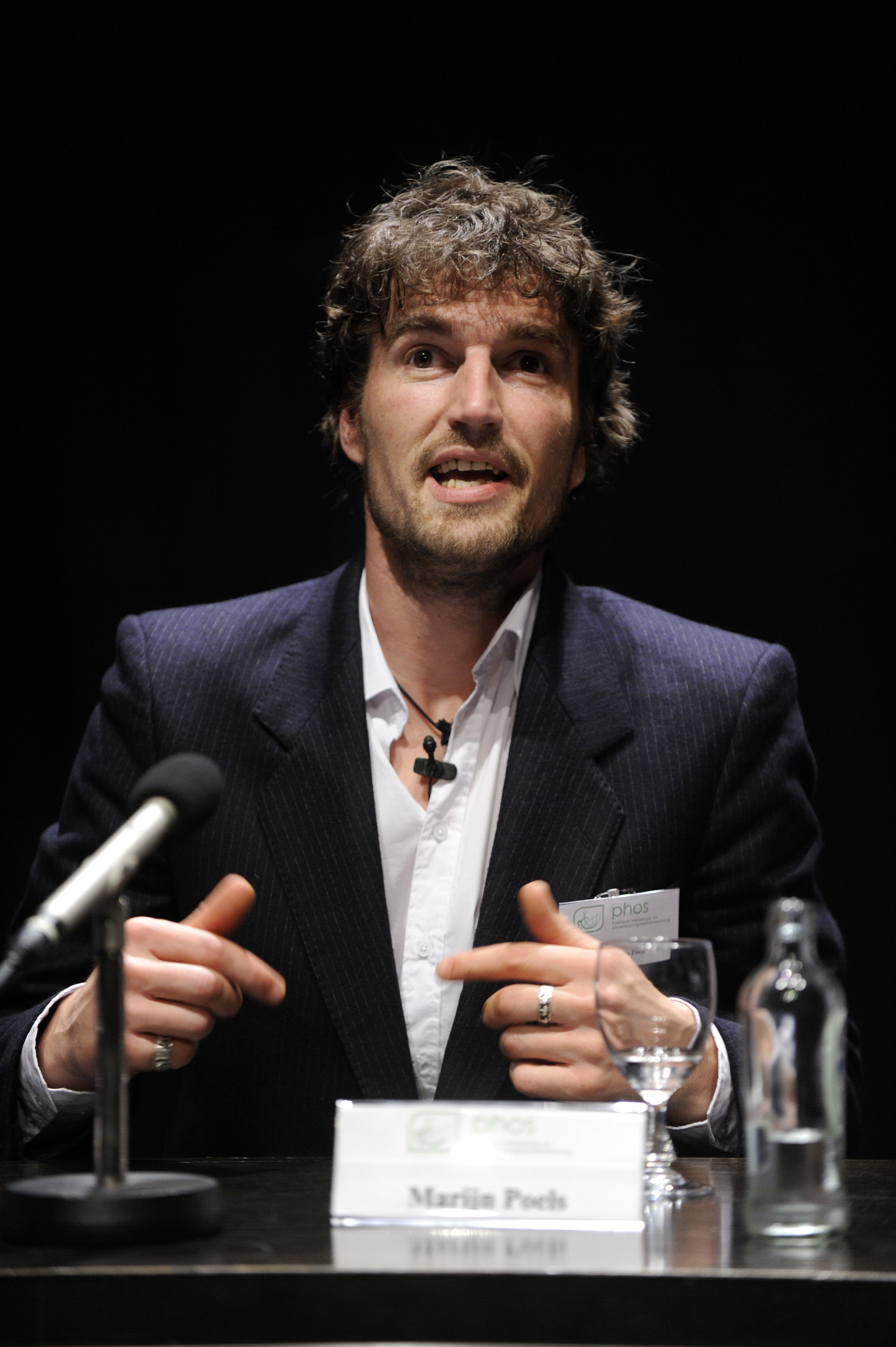
- Poels in Brussel to promote his documentary ‘The Voice of 650 Million', October 2010
- Born: Marijn Hendrik Jan; Meerlo, Netherlands
- Occupations: director, screenwriter, producer

Marijn Poels is a Dutch independent filmmaker, documentary filmmaker and international speaker. His feature films include The Uncertainty Has Settled, Paradogma, and he has also made several TV documentary series. Poels' films address international social, economic and political issues.

== Biography ==
In 2009 Poels wrote his first book, Between Two Worlds.

Poels' film style features real-life recordings, so that the viewer gets a relatively unfiltered view of reality without being directly fed an opinion by the filmmaker.

In 2017 Poel's produced the documentary The Uncertainty Has Settled, in which he questions the consensus on anthropogenic climate change and current energy policies. This film is part of a trilogy. In a sequel to this film, Paradogma, he investigates the toxic state of the current public debate and explored themes such as polarisation, conformism and intolerance. In the third part, Return to Eden, Poels returns to climate change and agriculture. This film asks the question to what extent humans are part of nature and where the boundaries lie in the urge to regulate climate change, nature and our food supply.

Poels released the documentary “Pandamned” on the COVID-19 pandemic in 2022. A fact check by Bayerischer Rundfunk concludes that the film collects statements from those who play down the coronavirus, “Querdenker” and well-known conspiracy theorists from Germany and other countries. The film repeats well-known anti-Semitic myths and unverifiable, unfounded or already refuted false statements.

=== Politics ===
In 2013, Poels produced the documentary Pablo, about the social cleansing ahead of the 2014 FIFA World Cup in Brazil. In January 2014, the documentary was screened at the Dutch Parliament. In response to the screening, the Christian Democratic Appeal and the Dutch Labour Party asked parliamentary questions about the violations of human rights ahead of the World Cup.

== Recognition and awards ==
- In 2011, Poels received the "Voice of Peace” medal in Lahore, Pakistan. This medal is annually awarded to persons who committed their selves against terrorism and violence in Pakistan and coming out for human rights.
- The cultural award "Heart for culture" was awarded to Poels in September 2015 by the municipality of Horst aan de Maas. The jury asks attention for people or groups who are involved in culture in an inspirational way.
- Spiritual Inspirator 2024. Marijn Poels was chosen by the readers of the monthly magazine Paravisie as Spiritual Inspirator of 2024. Previous winners of this award include Sandra Reemer, Erica Terpstra and Wim Hof [3].

=== Film awards ===
- 2011: Dody Spittal Award - Calgary - Picture This Film festival - The Voice of 650 Million Times One
- 2015: NL Award - Netherlands - Twee levens in een hart
- 2015: Audience Award - Warsaw Poland - Human Doc Filmfestival - Change From Within
- 2015: Golden Award - Los Angeles USA - Independent Film Awards -Ageless Friends
- 2016: Best Documentary - New York City USA - Direct Short Film festival -Ageless Friends
- 2016: Dody Spittal Award and Honorable Mention - Calgary - Picture This Film festival - Change From Within
- 2017: Best documentary - Berlin - Berlin Independent Film Festival - The Uncertainty Has Settled
- 2017: Best documentary - Los Angeles - Mindfield Film Festival - The Uncertainty Has Settled

== Filmography ==
Filmography
* 2005 - Full of smiles and mines - Cambodia
* 2005 - The American Dream - New-York
* 2006 - The Shadow side of a metropolis - Rio de Janeiro
* 2006 - Heideroosjes in Japan
* 2007 - Chapter Eight, Golden State - Hollywood
* 2007 - Surviving On God's Guidance - Zambia
* 2008 - Millenniumwar - Netherlands
* 2008 - Ethiopia on Wheels - Ethiopia
* 2008 - Nothing About Us - Ethiopia
* 2009 - L1mburg Helpt (TV documentary series)- Romania, Uganda, Congo, Brazil, Peru, India.
* 2010 - The Voice of 650 Million Times One - Kenya, Vietnam
* 2010 - It's Noy Always About Succes [sic?] - Netherlands, Wales
* 2010 - My Name is MAX - Netherlands
* 2010 - Building Dreams in Darkness - India
* 2011 - Route 15 - (TV documentary series)- Brazil, Mali, Sierre Leone, Suriname, Kenya, India, Pakistan, Filipijnen
* 2011 - Down the Lane - Kenya, Canada
* 2012 - L1mburg Helpt (TV documentary series) - Nicaragua, Ethiopië, Peru, Indonesië, Kenia, Armenië.
* 2012 - By Choice or Chance - Vietnam
* 2013 - Retour - Netherlands, Spain
* 2013 - PABLO - Brasil
* 2013 - Unerschöpflich - Germany, Brasil
* 2014 - Two Lives in one Heart - Morocco, Netherlands
* 2015 - L1mburg Helpt (TV documentary series) - Nicaragua, Guatemala, Ghana, Zimbabwe, Nepal, Sri Lanka, Indonesia
* 2016 - KANTHARI, change from within
* 2016 - AGELESS FRIENDS (60 min)
* 2017 - The Uncertainty Has Settled (89 min)
* 2018 - Paradogma (90 min)
* 2020 - Return To Eden (115 min)
* 2021 - Het Goede Doel Heiligt de Middelen (55 min)
* 2022 - PANDAMNED - The Documentary (131 min)
* 2023 - The Primordial Code (145 min)
* 2024 - The Primordial Code, The Burning Essence (119 min)
