= Kate Shemirani =

British conspiracy theorist

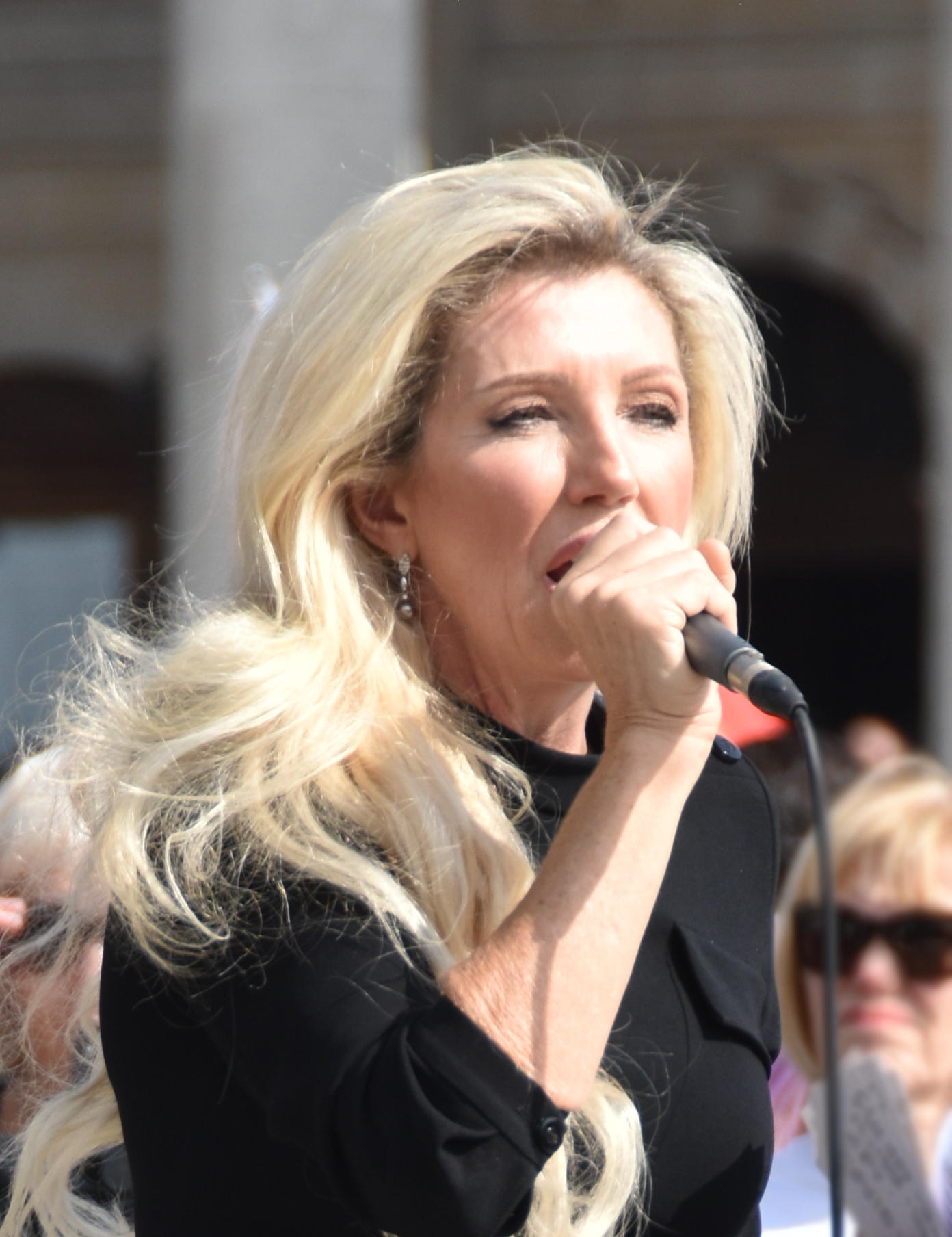
- Shemirani in 2020
- Born: 1965 (age 60–61)
- Occupation: Conspiracy theorist
- Political party: Save Us Now
- Movement: Conspiracism
- Spouse: Faramarz Shemirani (divorced)
- Children: 4

Kay Allison "Kate" Shemirani (born 1965) is a British conspiracy theorist, anti-vaccine activist and former nurse who lost her licence to practise in 2020 for misconduct. She is best known for promoting conspiracy theories about COVID-19, vaccinations and 5G technology. Shemirani has been described by The Jewish Chronicle as a leading figure of a movement that includes conspiracy theorists and far-left and far-right activists.

Shemirani styles herself the "Natural Nurse in a Toxic World". She was suspended by the Nursing and Midwifery Council (NMC) in July 2020 in response to complaints that she was spreading conspiracy theories and misinformation about COVID-19 and vaccines, and struck off (with a right to appeal after five years) in May 2021.

In October 2025, a coroner's inquest ruled Shemirani contributed to her daughter Paloma's 2024 death from cancer by influencing her to reject chemotherapy in favor of alternative treatments.

== Promotion of conspiracy theories ==
=== COVID-19 denialism ===
Shemirani describes the COVID-19 pandemic as a "plandemic" and a "scamdemic", and said in December 2020 that there was "no evidence that I can see that a pandemic exists". She characterises the pandemic as a conspiracy to control the masses, with any vaccine for COVID-19 being a "political tool to change people's DNA".

In a video published in Spring of 2020, she said "Just before Christmas we had [been told] … we're all going to die of measles… Now we're suddenly all going to die of coronavirus. I'm not buying any of it… I think it's really important that we don't just believe what the media tell us."

Shemirani has been suspended from Facebook several times for promoting harmful misinformation to her 54,000 followers, including linking the 5G mobile network to the COVID-19 pandemic. According to Hope Not Hate, who monitor online racism and conspiracy theories, her Facebook page describes the 9/11 attacks as a false flag, Satanic messages in music videos and the organised destruction of the nuclear family. By September 2020, her Facebook page had been removed. She was suspended from Twitter in late October 2020.

Shemirani has been the subject of complaints for likening measures to control the COVID-19 pandemic to Nazi war crimes and the Holocaust. She has referred to hospital deaths as "genocide" and the National Health Service (NHS) as "the new Auschwitz". She asked in one post, "When are people going to wake up? On the cattle truck? Or in the showers?" She has described the government as behaving like the Nazis in their attempts to tackle the COVID-19 pandemic. She defended her statements by saying:

When I likened this to Auschwitz and the cattle trucks – you tell me the difference?

Because the only time in history I could find where the doctors and nurses were able to end people's lives was the nurses of the Third Reich. The nurses of the Third Reich are here today.

I don't care if they find it offensive. I find it offensive that our elderly have been murdered in care homes.

Stop being a special snowflake and saying you're offended. They are killing our elderly, our most vulnerable.

An editorial in The Nursing Standard, stated that Shemirani is "openly propagating her unfounded opinions in her capacity as a nurse – and in doing so, casting doubt over the integrity of her nursing and medical colleagues." Shemirani has described nurses who raised concerns about her conduct as "overweight" and "envious" of her "decent looks" and success.

The Jewish Chronicle investigated Shemirani and found that online she made references to Hitler and the Nazis when describing the COVID-19 pandemic lockdown and the NHS.

Shemirani was a host and speaker at Resist and Act for Freedom, a protest event held at Trafalgar Square on 19 September 2020. The event gathered together protestors with a wide range of grievances relating to face masks, vaccinations, and a host of conspiracy theories, although David Icke and Piers Corbyn distanced themselves from the event, Corbyn accusing its organisers of "fake news used to divide Our Movement".

During her speech, she said that a vaccine for COVID-19 will mean that the government "will be able to look at every aspect of what's going on in our brains" and "not only can they pick it up, they can download into us". She also claimed, "They want you all wearing a mask, there's no science behind that mask. That mask is going to make you sick".

Whilst she was observing police officers amassing at the North West corner of the square, she urged members of the audience to confront the police. Protestors chanting "choose your side" formed a human blockade in order to prevent police actions and initially forced officers to retreat. Thirty protestors were arrested and the police dispersed the protest at approximately 3pm. A split in the campaign, with Steele and Shemirani on one side, and Icke and Corbyn on the other side, has been reported, with supporters of Icke describing Shemirani as "controlled opposition".

On 8 December 2020, Shemirani appeared on Sky News and gave an interview with Alex Rossi and made several unsubstantiated claims. She said, "No vaccine has ever been proven safe and no vaccine has ever been proven effective". Rossi interrupted and replied, "We know that's not true. Millions and millions of lives have been saved by vaccines". Shemirani swiftly replied, "Simply not true". Rossi sharply responded, "They're some of the safest medicines ever invented". That's just nonsense". Shemirani continued with more unsubstantiated claims and said, "There is no evidence that I can see that a pandemic exists. There is no evidence that SARS-CoV-2 has been purified and is unequivocally in existence".

On 1 March 2021, the Metropolitan Police reported that they had charged Shemirani with 6 breaches of the UK Coronavirus regulations along with fellow activist Piers Corbyn.

On 24 July 2021, Shemirani attended a protest at Trafalgar Square, London, and made threats to NHS doctors and nurses by comparing them to the doctors and nurses of Nazi Germany who were convicted at the Nuremberg Trials and hanged. She said, "Get their names. Email them to me. With a group of lawyers, we are collecting all that. At the Nuremberg Trials the doctors and nurses stood trial and they hung. If you are a doctor or a nurse, now is the time to get off that bus... and stand with us the people." The Mayor of London, Sadiq Khan, described her words as "utterly appalling" and reported her to the police. Following her remarks, there were concerns about the safety of doctors and nurses in the United Kingdom; the police launched an investigation. Her son Sebastian has called for the police to take action and to prosecute his mother because he believes that her remarks pose an immediate risk to the lives of the doctors and nurses in the United Kingdom.

On 30 August 2021, an anti-vaccine protest led by Shemirani was followed by the temporary closure of a vaccination facility in Churchill Square, Brighton after a smoke-bomb was set-off in the nearby shopping centre.

=== Antisemitism and conspiracy theories ===
Shemirani has espoused several anti-semitic conspiracy theories. She stated in an interview that her ex-husband had taught her about the Committee of 300, she explained that he gave her "an education in the New World Order, of the illuminati, the top families, who owns what. All the corruption, the murders, I knew all of that. But I never knew it would happen in my lifetime." Originally based on the distortion of a quote by German politician Walther Rathenau in 1909 about around 300 powerful men determining the fate of the world, the belief that the supposed 300 men were all Jewish became dominant. It is viewed as a parallel to the antisemitic hoax, The Protocols of the Elders of Zion.

She had repeated QAnon conspiracy theories about figures in the US Democratic Party. Shemirani promotes narratives that universal religious persecution operation exists and that a large-scale conspiracy by the global elite is perpetrating the sexual abuse of children.

Shemirani has stated her belief in the existence of Satanic cults, which she linked to conspiracy theories concerning COVID-19. In videos, she has told her followers in speeches that "Christians are being persecuted all over the world" (along with Muslims and Asians) by "paedophiles who are all in bed with one another." She claimed that these paedophiles "all worship the devil."

In 2023 the Boston Globe noted that Shemirani was one of a group of wellness conspiracy-theory promoters who had recently shifted to anti-trans rhetoric.

For Sherimani and other conspiracy theorists, moving from vaccine skepticism to transphobic dread lets them keep their focus on saving innocent children from supposedly amoral doctors. They can blow past the nuanced complexities around youth health care and women’s sports with spiritualized culture war battle cries for what they see as a back-to-nature crusade.

== Suspension from nursing ==
In June 2020, a virtual hearing of the Nursing and Midwifery Council, which regulates nursing and midwifery professions in the UK, gave Shemirani an interim suspension for 18 months. Shemirani's interim suspension was confirmed on 20 July 2020 in a hearing in which she was assisted by fellow conspiracy theorist Mark Steele who acted as her McKenzie friend. The reason for the suspension was to avoid risks of public harm, for promoting anti-vaccination and 5G networking conspiracy theories and claiming that the COVID-19 pandemic is a scam. Shemirani and Steele criticised the hearing for not listening to their claims about 5G and vaccination. Shemirani referred to nurses who carry out vaccinations as Nazis and to those who recognise the gravity of the pandemic as "complicit in the tyranny and lies". Steele described the Nursing and Midwifery Council as being complicit in genocide.

On 28 May 2021, the NMC Fitness to Practise Committee decided to remove Shemirani from the register of the Nursing and Midwifery Council. After five years, she will be able to appeal the decision if she wishes.

In August 2022 the Office of National Statistics began using the protected title ‘registered nurse’ for official employment statistics, as suggested by nursing campaigners, in response to a campaign against unlicensed individuals such as Shemirani continuing to refer to themselves as nurses.

Richard D. Gill, a campaigner who has supported convicted nurse Lucy Letby, appeared on a show by Shemirani in 2024. The appearance received scrutiny in the media.

== Personal life ==
Shemirani lives in East Sussex and had four children. Her ex-husband is Faramarz Shemirani.

Her son Sebastian gave an interview to Marianna Spring on 24 October 2020 about his mother, broadcast on the BBC World Service. During the interview, he told Spring that he contacted the BBC because he is worried that his mother's claims and ideas are "dangerous" and could have an impact on public health. Kate Shemirani was contacted by the BBC about her son's account. She responded: "From what I can see it would appear a 'conspiracy theorist' is actually now anyone who believes something other than what your controllers want them to believe... I find this deeply disturbing".

=== Death of Paloma Shemirani ===
In June 2025, her sons Gabriel and Sebastian accused Shemirani of being responsible for the death of their sister Paloma. They argued that their mother pressured Paloma into not having chemotherapy for non-Hodgkin lymphoma, from which she died in 2024. Paloma's former boyfriend and friends supported the brothers, providing evidence and testimony about Shemirani's behaviour in pushing her daughter towards "alternative" therapies, and isolating her from her siblings and friends. In October 2025, coroner Catherine Wood ruled that Shemirani had influenced her daughter to reject chemotherapy in favour of alternative treatments, contributing to her death.

At the inquest, held at Kent and Medway Coroner's Court in Maidstone on 2 October 2025, Wood concluded that the influence of Paloma's parents "more than minimally" contributed to her death and that Paloma had been "adversely influenced" in declining chemotherapy. The coroner recorded that doctors had advised Paloma she had an approximately 80% chance of recovery with chemotherapy, and stated: "If approached with an open mind, Paloma would have chosen the chance to survive, and if she had undergone chemotherapy she probably would have survived." Wood also found it was "highly likely" that Shemirani had seeded doubt in Paloma's mind about her diagnosis, and that she took a leading role in advising Paloma and facilitating access to alternative treatments, including daily coffee enemas and a strict diet, in place of chemotherapy.

== See also ==
- Protests over responses to the COVID-19 pandemic in the United Kingdom
