= Health Protection (Coronavirus, Wearing of Face Coverings in a Relevant Place) (England) Regulations 2020 =

United Kingdom emergency legislation

- Statutory Instrument
- Parliament of the United Kingdom
- Citation: SI 2020/791
- Introduced by: Matt Hancock, Secretary of State for Health and Social Care
- Territorial extent: England

Dates
- Made: 23 July 2020
- Laid before Parliament: 23 July 2020
- Commencement: 24 July 2020
- Revoked: 18 July 2021

Other legislation
- Made under: Public Health (Control of Disease) Act 1984
- Revoked by: Health Protection (Coronavirus, Restrictions) (Steps etc.) (England) (Revocation and Amendment) Regulations 2021

Status: Revoked

Text of the Health Protection (Coronavirus, Wearing of Face Coverings in a Relevant Place) (England) Regulations 2020 as in force today (including any amendments) within the United Kingdom, from legislation.gov.uk.

The Health Protection (Coronavirus, Wearing of Face Coverings in a Relevant Place) (England) Regulations 2020 (SI 2020/791) is a statutory instrument (SI) brought into force on 23 July 2020 by the Secretary of State for Health and Social Care, Matt Hancock, in response to the COVID-19 pandemic. Subject to some exceptions, it required members of the public in England to wear a face covering in most indoor shops, shopping centres, banks, post offices and public transport hubs. The regulations were similar to the Health Protection (Coronavirus, Wearing of Face Coverings on Public Transport) (England) Regulations 2020, which were brought into force on 15 June 2020. The regulations were revoked on 18 July 2021, five days before they would otherwise have expired.

== Initial regulations ==
=== Legal basis ===
The regulations were introduced by way of a Statutory Instrument made by the Secretary of State for Health and Social Care, Matt Hancock, using emergency powers available to him under the Public Health (Control of Disease) Act 1984. The regulations themselves state the legal basis for using such powers, namely "the serious and imminent threat to public health which is posed by the incidence and spread of severe acute respiratory syndrome coronavirus 2 (SARS-CoV-2) in England"; he also certified that the restrictions "are proportionate to what they seek to achieve, which is a public health response to that threat."

The regulations were made and laid before parliament on 23 July, and came into force the next day. The Secretary of State used section 45R of the Public Health (Control of Disease) Act 1984 to enact the regulations without prior parliamentary consideration, subject to retrospective approval by resolution of each House of Parliament within twenty-eight days.

=== Geographical scope ===
The regulations covered England only (the rules in Scotland, Wales and Northern Ireland differed).

=== Requirement to wear a face covering in a relevant place ===
Subject to a number of exceptions, nobody was allowed – unless they had a "reasonable excuse" – to enter or remain in a "relevant place" without wearing a face covering. Any type of face covering was considered acceptable, provided it covered the wearer's nose and mouth; the regulations did not require or mention a 'mask'.

"Relevant place" was defined as:

- indoor retail shops (including pharmacies), and shops providing goods for hire
- enclosed shopping centres
- banks, building societies and the like
- post offices, and
- public transport hubs (the enclosed parts of a station, terminal, port or the like).

The following premises were not considered to be "shops", and hence face coverings were not required: public libraries; premises providing professional, legal, financial, medical, optometry, mental health or veterinary services; cinemas, theatres, museums, galleries; indoor tourist, heritage or cultural sites; nightclubs, dance and bingo halls; concert, exhibition and other public halls; casinos; certain personal service premises including hair and beauty salons and barbers, tattoo and massage parlours; conference and exhibition centres; hotels; premises for indoor sports, leisure, adventure or recreation; storage and distribution centres; funeral directors; photography studios; and auction houses.

Also excluded were restaurants with table service, bars and pubs, as well as those areas of other premises having seating or tables for consumption of food and drink.

Several groups of people were entirely exempt from the requirement to wear a face covering, including children under the age of 11; staff and service providers at the premises; public transport staff on while duty, police officers, and emergency responders while on duty; as well as travellers at a transport hub within their own private vehicle.

=== Reasonable excuse ===
The regulations provided a list of excuses for not wearing a covering which were considered to be "reasonable", while not excluding other possibilities: where the traveller was unable to wear a covering due to a disability, or where it would cause severe distress; to facilitate lip reading; where the covering was removed to avoid the risk of harm; where a person travelling to escape a risk of harm had no covering with them; where reasonably necessary to eat, drink or take medication; where instructed to do so by an official; or where requested in a pharmacy.

=== Offences and enforcement ===
It was a criminal offence to contravene the regulations, and offenders could be prosecuted. Both police officers and some other officials had the power to deny access to a "relevant place" to anyone not wearing a face covering; and anyone already on the premises could be directed to wear a covering or to leave. Police officers also had the power to remove anyone not complying with a direction, using force if necessary, and to issue a fixed penalty notice of £100 (reduced to £50 if paid within 14 days).

=== Review and intended expiry ===
The Secretary of State had to review the regulations by 24 January 2021. They were initially intended expire on 24 July 2021.

== Range of premises extended, 8 August 2020 ==
SI 2020/791 was amended on 8 August 2020, after 15 days, by the Health Protection (Coronavirus, Wearing of Face Coverings in a Relevant Place) (England) (Amendment) Regulations 2020 (SI 2020/839). The amendments extended the range of indoor places where a face covering had to be worn to include indoor places of worship, community centres, crematoria and burial ground chapels, public areas in hotels, public halls including concert and exhibition halls, cinemas, museums, galleries, aquariums, indoor zoos and visitor farms, indoor parts of tourist, heritage or cultural sites, bingo halls, and public libraries. These were all subject to the same exceptions as before.

== Range of premises extended, 22 August 2020 ==
SI 2020/791 was amended on 22 August 2020, after a further 14 days, by the Health Protection (Coronavirus, Wearing of Face Coverings in a Relevant Place) (England) (Amendment) (No. 2) Regulations 2020 (SI 2020/882). The amendments extended the range of indoor places where a face covering had to be worn to include members clubs and social clubs, conference centres, and casinos. Funfairs, theme parks and other premises for sports, leisure or adventure activities were also now included where they fell within the definition of "shop" (i.e. an indoor establishment open to the public for the purpose of retail sale or hire).

== New penalties added, 28 August 2020 ==
From 28 August 2020 new penalties were introduced by the Health Protection (Coronavirus, Wearing of Face Coverings in a Relevant Place and on Public Transport) (England) (Amendment) Regulations 2020 (SI 2020/906). Repeat offenders faced a sliding scale of penalties up to a maximum of £3200 for the sixth and subsequent fixed penalty notice.

== Public-facing staff included, and more premises, 24 Sept 2020 ==
From 24 September, the Health Protection (Coronavirus, Wearing of Face Coverings in a Relevant Place and on Public Transport) (England) (Amendment) (No. 3) Regulations 2020 (SI 2020/1026) extended the requirement to wear a face covering to staff in the following places who were likely to come into close contact with members of the public: shops (except legal or financial services), enclosed shopping centres, restaurants with table service, bars, banks, building societies, post offices, community centres and clubs, public areas in hotels and hostels, public halls such as concert and exhibition halls, conference centres, cinemas, museums, galleries, aquariums, indoor parts of tourist, heritage or cultural sites, bingo halls, public libraries, casinos, and theatres. Public houses were inadvertently omitted from this list, but were added by the Health Protection (Coronavirus, Wearing of Face Coverings in a Relevant Place) (England) (Amendment) (No. 3) Regulations 2020 (SI 2020/1028) which amended SI 2020/1026 just as the regulations came into effect.

SI 2020/1024 also added a requirement that customers wear face coverings in theatres, restaurants, bars, and public houses, and removed the exception from wearing face coverings when sitting at tables in shops and shopping centres designated for consumption of food and drink. Customers in these premises had to wear face coverings at all times unless actively eating or drinking.

The regulations also doubled the penalties for breach to a minimum of £200 (£100 if paid within 14 days). All the existing exemptions and reasonable excuses remained available.

== Requirement to display notices or inform visitors, 28 Sept 2020 ==
The Health Protection (Coronavirus, Restrictions) (Obligations of Undertakings) (England) (Amendment) Regulations 2020 (SI 2020/1046) introduced a new notice requirement. Anyone responsible for premises where face coverings were required had to display a conspicuous notice or otherwise ensure that anyone entering was informed of the need to wear a such a covering. It also prohibited such a person from preventing or seeking to prevent the wearing of face coverings by those required to wear one.

== Polling stations, 8 March 2021 ==
The Health Protection (Coronavirus) (Wearing of Face Coverings in a Relevant Place and Restrictions: All Tiers) (England) (Amendment) Regulations 2021 (SI 2021/247) introduced a requirement from 8 March 2021 to wear a face covering in polling stations and in places where votes were being counted or postal votes opened. But the regulations could not be used to prevent a voter at a polling station from voting.

== Gatherings in community premises, 17 May 2021 ==
The Health Protection (Coronavirus, Restrictions) (Steps and Other Provisions) (England) (Amendment) Regulations 2021 (SI 2021/585) removed the requirement to wear a face covering from people attending an allowable gathering at a community centre.

== Revocation, 18 July 2021 ==
The regulations were revoked by the Health Protection (Coronavirus, Restrictions) (Steps etc.) (England) (Revocation and Amendment) Regulations 2021 (SI 2021/848) at 23:55 on 18 July 2021, five days before they would otherwise have expired.

== See also ==
- Health Protection (Coronavirus, Wearing of Face Coverings on Public Transport) (England) Regulations 2020
- Coronavirus Act 2020
- List of statutory instruments of the United Kingdom, 2020

== Bibliography ==
- "SI 592". Legislation.gov.uk. 15 June 2020. The Health Protection (Coronavirus, Wearing of Face Coverings on Public Transport) (England) Regulations 2020.
- "SI 791". Legislation.gov.uk. 24 July 2020. The Health Protection (Coronavirus, Wearing of Face Coverings in a Relevant Place) (England) Regulations 2020.
- "SI 839". Legislation.gov.uk. 8 August 2020. The Health Protection (Coronavirus, Wearing of Face Coverings in a Relevant Place) (England) (Amendment) Regulations 2020.
- "SI 882". Legislation.gov.uk. 22 August 2020. The Health Protection (Coronavirus, Wearing of Face Coverings in a Relevant Place) (England) (Amendment) (No. 2) Regulations 2020.
- "SI 906". Legislation.gov.uk. 28 August 2020. The Health Protection (Coronavirus, Wearing of Face Coverings in a Relevant Place and on Public Transport) (England) (Amendment) Regulations 2020.
- "SI 1026". Legislation.gov.uk. 23 September 2020. The Health Protection (Coronavirus, Wearing of Face Coverings in a Relevant Place and on Public Transport) (England) (Amendment) (No. 3) Regulations 2020.
- "SI 1028". Legislation.gov.uk. 23 September 2020. The Health Protection (Coronavirus, Wearing of Face Coverings in a Relevant Place) (England) (Amendment) (No. 3) Regulations 2020.
- "SI 1046". Legislation.gov.uk. 28 September 2020. The Health Protection (Coronavirus, Restrictions) (Obligations of Undertakings) (England) (Amendment) Regulations 2020.
- "SI 247". Legislation.gov.uk. 8 March 2021. The Health Protection (Coronavirus) (Wearing of Face Coverings in a Relevant Place and Restrictions: All Tiers) (England) (Amendment) Regulations 2021.
- "SI 585". Legislation.gov.uk. 17 May 2021. The Health Protection (Coronavirus, Restrictions) (Steps and Other Provisions) (England) (Amendment) Regulations 2021.
- "SI 848". Legislation.gov.uk. 16 July 2021. The Health Protection (Coronavirus, Restrictions) (Steps etc.) (England) (Revocation and Amendment) Regulations 2021.
