= Timeline of the COVID-19 pandemic in England =

Timeline of the COVID-19 pandemic in England may refer to:

- Timeline of the COVID-19 pandemic in England (January–June 2020)
- Timeline of the COVID-19 pandemic in England (July–December 2020)
- Timeline of the COVID-19 pandemic in England (2021)
- Timeline of the COVID-19 pandemic in England (2022)
