= Timeline of the COVID-19 pandemic in England (July–December 2020) =

Daily English events related to the 2020 pandemic

The following is a timeline of the COVID-19 pandemic in England from July 2020 to December 2020. There are significant differences in the legislation and the reporting between the countries of the UK: England, Scotland, Northern Ireland, and Wales.

== Timeline ==
=== July 2020 ===
- 1 July –
  - Following the reintroduction of stricter lockdown measures in Leicester, a number of local councils take to social media in an attempt to dispel false rumours that local lockdowns are imminent in their areas.
  - A report by Public Health England concludes that there was no obvious source for the spike in COVID-19 cases in Leicester.
- 2 July – Education Secretary Gavin Williamson announces the UK government's safety plans for getting schools in England fully operational in time for September. The plans include keeping classes and whole years separate in "bubbles", and providing schools with home test kits to provide to families of children who develop symptoms. Mobile testing units will also be deployed to schools in an instance of a COVID-19 case being confirmed.
- 3 July –
  - The UK government publishes a list of 59 countries for which quarantine will not apply when arriving back in England as from 10 July. They include Greece, France, Belgium and Spain, but Portugal and the United States are among those not on the list. These changes do not apply to Scotland, Wales or Northern Ireland, where quarantine restrictions remain in place for all arrivals from outside the UK.
  - The UK government rushes The Health Protection (Coronavirus, Restrictions) (Leicester) Regulations 2020 through parliament to give police the powers to enforce lockdown restrictions in Leicester as from 4 July.
  - Public Health England starts including "pillar 1" and "pillar 2" cases for local authorities in England, an adjustment expected to show an apparent rise in cases in many places.
  - On the eve of the latest easing of lockdown restrictions for England, Prime Minister Boris Johnson describes the changes as the "biggest step yet on the road to recovery", and warns the public not to let reopening businesses down by ignoring social distancing rules. He also said that local lockdown measures rather than national restrictions may be imposed to control the virus.
  - Boris Johnson announces that recreational cricket can resume in England from 11 July.
- 4 July –
  - The Health Protection (Coronavirus, Restrictions) (No. 2) (England) Regulations 2020 come into force in England, replacing and relaxing the previous Lockdown Regulations (SI 350), and giving the Secretary of State powers to make declarations restricting access to public outdoor places. Leicester is excluded from the relaxations due to its high rate of COVID-19, with more stringent regulations in force.
  - Re-opening hairdressing salons announce a variety of safety measures, including the need for customers to book online, to wait outside for the appointment, and to wear a face covering. Hairdresser in some salons will wear protective equipment, and alternate workstations will remain unused. Some will cease to offer dry cuts.
- 5 July –
  - In an interview with the BBC, Sir Simon Stevens, the Chief Executive of NHS England, says that COVID-19 has shone a "very harsh spotlight" on the "resilience" of the care system, and that adequate plans to fund social care should be in place within a year.
  - The UK government announces new quarantine exemption rules for participants in major sporting events, as well as film and television productions, allowing them to resume. The rules apply to England, where participants will need to work in a controlled environment and be tested for COVID-19.
- 6 July – As concerns about increasing unemployment grow, the UK government announces a £111m scheme to help firms in England provide an extra 30,000 trainee places; £21m will be provided to fund similar schemes in Scotland, Wales and Northern Ireland.
- 7 July – Three pubs in Yorkshire, Hampshire and Somerset that reopened on 4 July close again after customers tested positive for COVID-19.
- 8 July – Hillingdon Hospital in Uxbridge closes its Accident and Emergency Department due to an outbreak of COVID-19, while 70 members of staff at the hospital go into self-isolation.
- 9 July –
  - Two sets of data are released that show the number of cases of COVID-19 are falling in England; Office for National Statistics figures estimate one in 3,900 people have the virus, down from one in 2,200 the previous week, while Public Health England figures indicate that cases fell by 25% in the week to 5 July.
  - Culture Secretary Oliver Dowden announces that swimming pools, gyms, grassroots sport, close contact businesses and outdoor theatre can return in England with the following programme: Outdoor pools to reopen from 11 July; grassroots sport to resume from the weekend of 11 July, beginning with cricket; outdoor theatre to resume from 11 July; beauticians, tattooists, spas, tanning salons and other close contact services to reopen from 13 July "subject to some restrictions"; and indoor gyms, swimming pools and sports facilities to reopen from 25 July. In addition, a small pilot of indoor performances with socially distanced audiences will take place to assess the best way to restart them.
- 10 July –
  - As the wearing of face coverings becomes mandatory in shops in Scotland, the UK Government considers whether to introduce the same rule for shops in England. The Prime Minister is seen in public wearing one.
  - Bosses at the Birmingham Repertory Theatre, one of the UK's leading production theatres, warn that the theatre is at risk of losing 47 of its staff members (about 40% of its workforce), and is in danger of closing because of the economic impact of the COVID-19 pandemic.
- 11 July –
  - Parts of The Health Protection (Coronavirus, Restrictions) (No. 2) (England) (Amendment) Regulations 2020 come into effect, allowing outdoor swimming pools and water parks to re-open. Operators of outdoor swimming pools, many of them community groups and charities, criticise the UK government's timing, citing a lack of preparation time that has made a short summer season "unviable".
  - Belgium includes Leicester on its "red zone" list, meaning anyone who has recently visited the city will be required to quarantine for 14 days on arrival in Belgium.
- 12 July –
  - Michael Gove, the Minister for the Cabinet Office, says he does not believe it should be compulsory to wear face coverings in shops in England, but to do so is "basic good manners".
  - 73 workers at a farm in Herefordshire have tested positive for COVID-19, requiring the rest of the farm's 200 or so workers to self-isolate.
- 13 July –
  - The remainder of The Health Protection (Coronavirus, Restrictions) (No. 2) (England) (Amendment) Regulations 2020 comes into effect, allowing the re-opening of nail bars and salons, tanning booths and salons, spas and beauty salons, massage parlours, tattoo parlours, and body and skin piercing services.
  - The Prime Minister says that people "should be wearing" face coverings in shops in England, and the UK government will decide in the next few days whether "tools of enforcement" are required to ensure that they do.
- 14 July –
  - The UK government announces that the wearing of face coverings will become compulsory in shops and supermarkets in England from 24 July. Those who fail to do so will face a fine of up to £100. Health Secretary Matt Hancock says the move will "give people more confidence to shop safely and enhance protections for those who work in shops".
  - In a bid to avoid a full Leicester-style lockdown, the unitary authority of Blackburn with Darwen introduces a series of tighter measures that must be observed for the next month following a spike in COVID-19 cases in the area. These include tighter limits on visitors from another household, and a recommendation to bump elbows rather than hugs or shaking hands.
  - A piece by the street artist Banksy appears on a London Underground train, encouraging people to wear face coverings. The artwork, titled If You Don't Mask, You Don't Get, is subsequently removed by cleaners who were unaware of the identity of its creator.
- 15 July – Health Secretary Matt Hancock confirms there are no plans to make the wearing of face coverings compulsory for office workers in England.
- 16 July – Education Secretary Gavin Williamson announces plans for an emergency loans scheme for universities in England in danger of bankruptcy because of the financial impact of the pandemic. The announcement comes after a report by the Institute of Fiscal Studies identified 13 unnamed universities facing financial difficulties.
  - The Borough of Pendle in Lancashire introduces extra social distancing precautions to help stem a local rise in COVID-19 cases and avoid full lockdown.
  - Health Secretary Matt Hancock announces that restrictions relating to schools and nurseries in Leicester will be lifted from 24 July after a fall in cases in the city. But bars and restaurants will remain closed, and restrictions on gatherings and visitors will continue.
- 17 July –
  - The Prime Minister announces a further easing of lockdown restrictions for England, with plans for a "significant return to normality" by Christmas. The new guidelines allow people to use public transport for non-essential journeys with immediate effect, while employers will have more discretion over their work places from 1 August. From 18 July, local authorities will have the power to enforce local shutdowns.
  - Johnson announces an extra £3bn for the NHS in England to help prepare for a possible second wave of COVID-19 over the coming winter.
  - Johnson announces a pilot scheme for a return to spectator sports, with a view to a full return by 1 October. The 2020 World Snooker Championship and the Glorious Goodwood Festival are among the first two sporting events to be part of the pilot. A pilot scheme is also announced for a return to indoor performances with socially distanced audiences at theatres, music and performance venues, with a view to a full return in August.
  - Health Secretary Matt Hancock calls for a review of the way COVID-19 deaths are recorded in England after Public Health England confirms it records deaths as COVID related even if the death occurs several months after someone has tested positive for the virus; the other Home Nations do not record a death as COVID related if it occurs more than 28 days after a positive test.
  - Rochdale introduces extra social distancing precautions to avoid full lockdown following a rise in COVID-19 cases in the area.
- 18 July –
  - The Health Protection (Coronavirus, Restrictions) (England) (No. 3) Regulations 2020 come into force, giving local authorities in England new powers to close shops and outdoor public spaces, and to cancel events in order to control COVID-19.
  - A pub in Manchester becomes one of the first venues to stage a live gig since as lockdown measures continue to be eased.
- 19 July – Concerns are raised about England's contact-tracing system as it emerges that at least 50% of the people identified as having had close contact with someone in Blackburn who has tested positive for COVID-19 have not been contacted.
- 20 July – Figures released by Public Health England show that Blackburn with Darwen is overtaking Leicester as England's COVID-19 hotspot, with 79.2 cases per 100,000 in the week up to 17 July. Cases have almost doubled from 63 to 118 in a week.
- 22 July –
  - The UK government permits visits to care homes to resume in England, but recommends one constant visitor per resident, and gives local authorities and public health directors responsibility for giving the go-ahead to individual homes.
  - Driving tests resume in England.
- 23 July –
  - On the eve of the introduction of new regulations for the wearing of face coverings in England, the UK Government releases full guidelines on when and where they should be worn.
  - A network of COVID walk-in test centres will be established throughout England, with a view to being fully operational by the end of October.
  - Residents in Blackburn and Luton are told the latest round of lockdown easing will not be allowed in those towns due to a high number of COVID-19 cases.
- 24 July –
  - The Health Protection (Coronavirus, Wearing of Face Coverings in a Relevant Place) (England) Regulations 2020 come into force, requiring members of the public to wear a face covering in most indoor shops, shopping centres, banks, post offices and public transport hubs. They must also be worn by anyone buying takeaway food or drink from an outlet, but may be removed by those eating in. Children under 11, and people with disabilities or certain health conditions that would make the wearing of a face covering difficult are exempt. The new regulations are similar to The Health Protection (Coronavirus, Wearing of Face Coverings on Public Transport) (England) Regulations 2020, which came into force on 15 June 2020.
  - The Football Association confirms that the 2020–21 English Premier League and Football League season will begin on 12 September.
  - The list of countries from where travellers do not have to quarantine when arriving in England is updated, adding Estonia, Latvia, Slovakia, Slovenia and St Vincent and the Grenadines; travellers from Portugal must still isolate for 14 days.
  - The UK government announces that 30 million people in England will be offered the flu vaccine over the coming winter.
  - It is reported that, as a result of the pandemic and job losses, almost 1,000 people have applied to a restaurant in Manchester advertising a vacancy for a receptionist.
- 25 July –
  - With the coming into force of The Health Protection (Coronavirus, Restrictions) (No. 2) (England) (Amendment) (No. 2) Regulations 2020, indoor gyms, swimming pools and other indoor sports facilities begin to reopen.
  - Public Health England warns that being obese and overweight puts people at greater risk of severe illness or death as a result of COVID-19.
  - The UK government announces £2.25m worth of emergency funding for small music venues in England, which will be shared by 150 venues.
  - Following a rise in COVID-19 cases in Spain, and concerns of a second wave, the UK Government confirms that travellers returning to England from Spain will be required to quarantine for 14 days from 26 July.
- 26 July –
  - 21 people have tested positive for COVID-19 at a caravan park in Craven Arms, Shropshire, with health experts warning the number of cases will rise.
  - Westminster Abbey has warned it is set to make 20% of its staff redundant after losing as much as £12m in tourist revenue because of the lockdown.
- 27 July – A concrete-making plant involved in the construction of the Hinkley Point nuclear processing plant is closed by owners Balfour Beatty following an outbreak of COVID-19 at the site.
- 28 July –
  - Oldham introduces tougher restrictions to curb the virus after a spike in cases; residents are asked to refrain from having social visitors, keep two metres apart when outside, and those who are shielding are asked to continue to do so until 14 August, while care homes will not relax restrictions.
  - Folk musician Frank Turner plays a gig to an audience of 200 at London's Clapham Grand where safety measures are trialled for the return of live music. But the venue's manager says the format is not economically viable as it would not allow venues to make enough money to cover operating costs.
- 30 July –
  - Office for National Statistics figures indicate that England had the highest number of excess deaths in Europe between the end of February and mid-June, and had the second highest peak in number of deaths behind Spain.
  - Restrictions are placed on Greater Manchester, and parts of East Lancashire and Yorkshire prohibiting separate households from meeting indoors following an "increasing rate of transmission" in those areas caused by people failing to adhere to social distancing rules. The restrictions take effect from midnight.
- 31 July –
  - Prime Minister Boris Johnson postpones some lockdown easing measures scheduled to begin on 1 August for two weeks amid concerns about rising COVID-19 cases. Bowling alleys and casinos will remain closed until 15 August, while wedding receptions of up to 30 people are also moved back to that date. Trials of spectator sporting events are also paused. From 8 August the wearing of face coverings in more indoor settings, such as cinemas and places of worship will become mandatory.
  - The ONS household survey indicates COVID-19 cases in England are rising again, with an increase from 2,800 to 4,200 daily cases in the week of 20–26 July.
  - Pubs, restaurants and hairdressers in Leicester are given permission to reopen from Monday 3 August.

=== August 2020 ===
- 1 August –
  - The shielding programme is paused for England and Scotland, but will continue for the areas where extra precautions have been introduced.
  - Professor Graham Medley, one of the scientists advising the government, suggests a "trade-off" may be required to allow schools to reopen in England, whereby pubs or "other facilities" have to close.
  - Local authorities warn of the difficulty of enforcing social distancing rules on beaches after a spell of hot weather results in an influx of people to the coast.
- 2 August –
  - A major incident is declared in Greater Manchester after rises in coronavirus infection rates.
  - Housing Minister Robert Jenrick says that reopening schools in England for September is an "absolute priority" for the government.
- 3 August – Restaurants, pubs and hairdressers in Leicester are allowed to reopen as lockdown restrictions are eased in the city.
- 5 August –
  - Anne Longfield, England's children's commissioner, says that schools should be the "first to open, last to close" in any future lockdown scenario, because children pose a lesser risk of spreading COVID-19.
  - Tahir Malik resigns as mayor of Luton for breaching lockdown restrictions after being pictured at a garden party with two other councillors.
  - Figures released by Transport for London indicate its staff caught 53,900 people not wearing a mask on its buses between 4 July and 2 August.
- 6 August –
  - 50 million face masks bought by the UK government for use by NHS England in April will not be used due to safety concerns, officials confirm. the masks, which fasten rather than having head loops do not fit tightly enough.
  - Officials state that a second attempt at creating a contact-tracing app for England has almost reached the testing phase.
- 7 August – Lockdown measures are reintroduced in Preston, Lancashire, effective from midnight and following a spike in COVID-19 cases there. They include banning households from meeting up with each other at home.
- 8 August –
  - The Health Protection (Coronavirus, Wearing of Face Coverings in a Relevant Place) (England) (Amendment) Regulations 2020 come into effect, extending the range of indoor locations where a face covering has to be worn to include indoor places of worship, community centres, crematoria and burial ground chapels, public areas in hotels, public halls including concert and exhibition halls, cinemas, museums, galleries, aquariums, indoor zoos and visitor farms, indoor parts of tourist, heritage or cultural sites, bingo halls, and public libraries.
  - The rise in COVID cases among those under 30 in the Preston area prompts authorities to launch the "Don't kill Granny" slogan.
- 9 August –
  - Writing in The Mail on Sunday, Prime Minister Boris Johnson says there is a "moral duty" to get all children in England back to school in September.
  - Andy Burnham, the Mayor of Greater Manchester, warns that pubs may have to close to allow schools to reopen safely if England's NHS Test and Trace is not "fixed urgently". His comments come after data suggests a 53% local success rate in tracing those who have had contact with a person testing positive for COVID-19.
- 10 August – The UK government announces that NHS Test and Trace will shrink its contact tracers from 18,000 to 12,000 by the end of August, with the remainder working in teams alongside local public health officials in the community, where they will visit those who have come into contact with an infected person. The strategy has been deployed successfully in places like Blackburn and Luton.
- 12 August – Education Secretary Gavin Williamson apologises to every school pupil for "the disruption that they've had to suffer" because of the pandemic, and says the best thing that can happen now is for them all to return to school.
- 13 August –
  - England's revamped contact-tracing app begins public trials, with residents of the Isle of Wight, the London Borough of Newham, and NHS volunteer responders being the first to test it.
  - Workers at a sandwich factory in Northampton are self-isolating following an outbreak of COVID-19 at the plant.
  - A Level results are published. In England, 36% of results are lower than teachers predicted, with 3% being two grades lower.
  - Prime Minister Boris Johnson announces a further easing of lockdown measures for England from 15 August, with a greater range of beauty treatments, indoor gigs and wedding receptions of up to 30 permitted, as well as the reopening of bowling alleys, casinos and soft play centres. Potential fines for refusing to wear a mask and the organisers or illegal raves are also to be increased.
- 14 August –
  - Office for National Statistics figures indicate cases of COVID-19 appear to have stabilised in England following a small increase in July, and despite local clusters of cases. The latest statistics show an estimated 1 in 1,900 in England, or 28,300 people, have the virus.
  - Government figures indicate the R number to be between 0.8 and 1 in England, but members of the Scientific Advisory Group for Emergencies (SAGE) that advises the government, say they are not confident the number is below 1.
  - The Department of Health and Social Care confirms that lockdown restrictions are to remain in Greater Manchester and parts of East Lancashire as cases have not decreased in the area. Restrictions are also to continue in parts of West Yorkshire and Leicester.
- 15 August –
  - Education Secretary Gavin Williamson confirms A Level and GCSE appeals will be free.
  - Liverpool's Cavern Club, famous for launching the career of The Beatles, has reported it faces financial ruin because of the COVID-19 pandemic, having lost an estimated £30,000 a week since lockdown began in March.
- 16 August – The Sunday Telegraph reports that Public Health England is to be replaced by a new organisation tasked with protecting the UK against future pandemics.
- 17 August – The UK government announces that A Level and GCSE students in England will have their results based on teachers' assessments following uproar over grades.
- 18 August –
  - Health Secretary Matt Hancock announces the creation of the National Institute for Health Protection to replace Public Health England; Baroness Dido Harding is appointed as its chair.
  - Lockdown measures are partially eased in Leicester, allowing beauty salons and outdoor pools to reopen from the following day.
- 19 August –
  - Birmingham's Director of Public Health bans "non-essential" visits to care homes following a rise of COVID-19 cases in the city.
  - The UK government announces plans to expand the Office for National Statistics' Infection Survey, which tests people fortnightly for COVID-19; tests will increase from 28,000 people in England to 150,000 by October.
- 20 August –
  - GCSE results are published, with grades now based on teachers' assessments; 78.8% of papers rated grade 4 or above, compared to 69.9% in 2019.
  - The UK government lifts the cap on the number of medical, dentistry, veterinary and teaching students enrolling on courses, and agrees targeted extra funding, while universities in England will offer students their first choice of course, though many will have to defer for a year.
- 21 August –
  - Stricter restrictions are announced for residents in Oldham, Pendle and Blackburn from midnight on 22 August, preventing them from socialising with anyone outside their household, but workplaces, childcare facilities and businesses, including restaurants and pubs, are to remain open.
  - Restrictions are removed from Wigan, Rossendale and Darwen, while Birmingham is added to the government's watchlist as an "area of enhanced support". Northampton becomes an "area of intervention".
  - Birmingham City Council introduces a number of voluntary measures aimed at preventing a full local lockdown in the city, including a halt on further sectors reopening, advice to wear face coverings in taxi cabs, limitations on gatherings of over 30 people except for acts of worship, and restricting the number of people who can meet up with another household to two.
  - The ban on evictions due to expire on 23 August is extended until 20 September amid concerns that thousands of people could be made homeless.
  - The government appoints senior civil servant Susan Acland-Hood to the Department for Education as a second permanent secretary for six weeks to help deal with the response to the A Levels controversy.
- 22 August –
  - Council leaders in the north west urge the government to provide clarity on new restrictions amid concerns it is unclear how they will be implemented and policed.
  - A further £1.1m of government funding (as part of the Culture Recovery Fund) is announced to help small music venues.
- 23 August – Police in Birmingham report that a total of 70 unlicensed social gatherings, including house and street parties, were disrupted overnight.
- 24 August – Greater Manchester Police reveal they have broken up 126 illegal gatherings over the preceding weekend, including a child's tenth birthday party. Responding to criticism of the police for their actions over the party, Chief Constable Ian Hopkins says it was not a "jelly and ice cream" event and saw "mostly adults celebrating".
- 25 August –
  - Sally Collier resigns as head of Ofqual following the exam grades controversy.
  - After face coverings are made compulsory for students in communal areas of schools in Scotland, pressure grows on the UK government to update the guidelines for wearing face coverings at schools in England. The government subsequently issues new guidelines requiring pupils at schools in areas subject to lockdown restrictions to wear face coverings in corridors and other communal areas.
- 26 August – Birmingham City Council is given the authority to close pubs and restaurants that fail to comply with COVID-19 regulations.
- 27 August – Birmingham City Council announces plans to launch an enhanced test and trace system by mid-September in a bid to avoid full lockdown.
- 28 August –
  - Health Secretary Matt Hancock announces that restrictions will be eased from 2 September in Bolton, Stockport, Trafford, Burnley, Hyndburn and parts of Bradford, Calderdale and Kirklees, allowing households to mix again; restrictions in Leicester will be reviewed again on 11 September.
  - The Office for National Statistics weekly household survey indicated cases of COVID-19 are levelling off in England following a slight increase in July; it estimated there were 2,200 cases per day in the week up to 20 August.
- 29 August –
  - Government guidelines on COVID-19 in schools suggest that an entire bubble would be sent home to isolate for fourteen days in the event of a single case being confirmed at a school, presenting the possibility that an entire school year could be sent home in such an instance. Schools in areas where COVID cases are high may also teach pupils on a rota basis, with groups being sent home alternately for two weeks.
  - The first football match with spectators takes place in Brighton, with 2,500 people allowed in to watch a pre-season friendly between Chelsea and Brighton.
  - Women's football makes a return for the first time since lockdown, with a Community Shield match between Chelsea and Manchester City, the first Women's Community Shield to be held since 2008.
- 30 August –
  - In an open letter to parents, Education Secretary Gavin Williamson warns those who do not send their children back to school risk putting a "huge dent in their future life chances".
  - The activist Piers Corbyn has been fined £10,000 for organising an anti-lockdown rally in Trafalgar Square, London.
- 31 August – The opposition Labour Party urges the UK government to delay 2021's GCSE and A Level exams until mid-summer to help deal with teaching time lost because of lockdown.

=== September 2020 ===
- 1 September –
  - Education minister Nick Gibb confirms the government will make a decision "very soon" about whether to delay school exams in 2021.
  - Research conducted by the National Foundation for Educational Research suggests that schoolchildren are three months behind in their studies following lockdown, with boys and poorer pupils the most affected.
  - A trial begins in Blackburn with Darwen, Pendle, and Oldham of payments to those on low incomes who are asked to self-isolate by NHS Test and Trace. Up to £182 will be paid to people receiving Universal Credit or Working Tax Credit, who are either employed and unable to work from home, or self-employed and unable to work without social contact.
- 2 September –
  - Plans to ease lockdown restrictions in Bolton and Trafford are scrapped following a rise in COVID-19 cases in the areas, while Mayor of Greater Manchester Andy Burnham urges the rest of Greater Manchester to "continue to minimise mixing in the home".
  - England's exam regulator, Ofqual, says it warned the government there could be widespread dissatisfaction with its emergency grading system, and that an alternative solution such as delaying exams would have been better.
- 4 September –
  - Councillors in Leeds, West Yorkshire, urge residents to make a "collective effort" to avoid local lockdown measures after the seven day average of COVID-19 cases in the city rise to 29.4 cases per 100,000. Leeds is also added to Public Health England's watchlist as an area of concern.
  - Corby, Kettering, South Tyneside and Middlesbrough are also added to the list as areas of concern, while Northampton is downgraded from an area of intervention to an area of enhanced concern. Rossendale and Norfolk are also listed as areas of enhanced concern.
  - The Office for National Statistics household survey suggests COVID-19 cases remained unchanged in England for the week up to 25 August, despite local spikes in cases.
- 5 September –
  - People in Bolton are asked to limit their use of public transport to essential journeys and avoid indoor or outdoor mixing with people outside their support bubbles after COVID-19 cases soar to 99 in 100,000 in a week, the highest rate in England.
  - Lawyers express their concern about the delay in court cases in England and Wales, with some 9,000 having been delayed since the start of lockdown, and warn that measures put in place to speed up cases may not be effective.
- 7 September –
  - The UK government announces that travellers arriving from the Greek islands of Lesvos, Tinos, Serifos, Mykonos, Santorini, Crete and Zakynthos will be required to quarantine from 4am on 9 September.
  - Manchester City footballers Riyad Mahrez and Aymeric Laporte test positive for COVID-19 and are required to self-isolate.
  - England footballers Phil Foden and Mason Greenwood are sent home from training in Iceland following a breach of COVID-19 rules.
- 8 September –
  - Following a rise in COVID-19 cases, social gatherings of more than six people are made illegal from 14 September, with the exception of workplaces, schools, COVID secure weddings and funerals, and organised team sports.
  - Businesses including soft play centres, bowling alleys and casinos are permitted to reopen in Greater Manchester, Lancashire and West Yorkshire.
  - Lockdown measures are further tightened in Bolton after COVID-19 cases increase to 120 in every 100,000. The measures include limiting food outlets to takeaway meals only, and a curfew requiring businesses to close between 22:00 and 05:00. Health Secretary Matt Hancock blames socialising by people in their 20s and 30s for the increase.
  - COVID-19 cases in Birmingham have increased to 62.2 per 100,000, with local officials working to avoid lockdown measures being implemented.
  - Sarah-Jane Marsh, a director of England's test and trace programme, issues an apology for problems with the system, explaining it is laboratories rather than the testing sites that are the "critical pinch-point".
- 9 September –
  - The new rules regarding social gatherings are further elaborated upon by Prime Minister Boris Johnson in a government press conference, alongside details of new legal requirements for data gathering on behalf of venues, social distancing "martials" to enforce restrictions, and a "moonshot" plan to further control the virus with greatly expanded mass virus testing.
  - The St Leger meeting opens at Doncaster Racecourse with spectators, but health officials order the racecourse to hold the meeting behind closed doors from 10 September on public health grounds.
  - Health Secretary Matt Hancock suggests people should avoid the "inappropriate" use of COVID tests if they do not have symptoms, saying it makes getting a test more difficult for those who do have symptoms.
  - The organisers of Birmingham's German Market have cancelled the 2020 event because of the COVID-19 pandemic.
  - Solihull Metropolitan Borough Council suspends care home visits in Solihull as COVID-19 cases in the town reach 50 per 100,000; officials will also make extra visits to bars, restaurants and pubs to ensure they are complying with COVID restrictions.
- 10 September –
  - Scientists and health experts express their doubt about Boris Johnson's "Operation Moonshot" plans to test several million people daily for COVID-19 with a quick turnaround, saying that the laboratory capacity is not there, while the British Medical Journal quotes a leaked document that claims the process would cost £100bn.
  - Health Secretary Matt Hancock says the rules limiting social gatherings to no more than six people will not be kept in place "any longer than we have to".
  - Guidance for universities in England says that they should only switch to full online learning as a last resort if there is a COVID-19 outbreak in the local area.
  - Travellers returning to England from the Portuguese mainland, Hungary, French Polynesia and Réunion from 12 September must self-isolate for two weeks; those returning from Sweden no longer need to self-isolate.
  - Hospital waiting lists in England have increased because of the pandemic, figures show, with the volume of patients waiting for treatment at their highest since records began in 2007. Two million patients have waited 18 weeks or longer for treatment, while 83,000 have waited for more than a year.
  - Two boat shows scheduled for Southampton the following day – BOATS2020, and the smaller sailing show MDL Ocean Village – are cancelled at short notice by public health officials because of fears over the COVID-19 pandemic.
- 11 September – Households in Birmingham and neighbouring Solihull and Sandwell are banned from mixing from 15 September as COVID-19 cases in Birmingham reach 90.3 per 100,000, but six people from more than one household can still visit pubs, restaurants and bars, and shops remain open.
- 12 September –
  - Cabinet Office Minister Michael Gove confirms that children in England will be included in new "rule of six" socialising restrictions; Scotland and Wales have not included children under the age of 12 in the new rules.
  - Anti-lockdown protesters gather in Birmingham City Centre to demonstrate against the introduction of tighter restrictions in the area.
  - The 2020–21 English football season begins.
- 13 September – The UK government writes to care home providers in England to warn them of a rise in COVID-19 cases in the sector; cases have risen among staff, but there are fears they could spread to residents.
- 14 September –
  - The Health Protection (Coronavirus, Restrictions) (No. 2) (England) (Amendment) (No. 4) Regulations 2020 came into force at 12.01 a.m. Unless one of the exceptions applies, the statutory instrument provides authority to limit the number of persons in a gathering to no more than six; hence the rule of six.
  - NHS England writes to GPs surgeries to advise them to make patients aware that face-to-face appointments with a doctor can be made if required; at least half of the 102 million appointments made between March and July are estimated to have been online or via telephone.
  - Headteachers warn that schools are being impacted by delays in COVID tests for teachers.
- 15 September –
  - Health Secretary Matt Hancock tells the House of Commons that England's COVID-19 testing system has faced an "enormous challenge" after a "sharp rise" in the demand for tests, but that the issue will be resolved in a "matter of weeks".
  - The first official figures for school attendance published since the beginning of the autumn term show that 88% of pupils have returned to the classroom.
- 16 September –
  - Secretary of State for Justice Robert Buckland says that resolving delays with testing is "the number one issue", with plans to publish a strategy within days that will prioritise NHS facilities and care homes, as well as schools. Prime Minister Boris Johnson says the system is dealing with a "colossal spike" in demand, and that an "action plan" for care homes will be released shortly.
  - A number of local authorities have said that the introduction of "COVID marshals", announced by Prime Minister Boris Johnson as a way to enforce social distancing, rules on gatherings and the wearing of face coverings, is "unlikely" and "almost impossible".
  - Bolton NHS Trust urges people who are not seriously ill to avoid visiting accident and emergency departments after 100 people turned up at a local hospital asking for COVID-19 tests.
- 17 September –
  - Following a rise in COVID-19 cases in the north east, local lockdown measures are announced for Newcastle-upon-Tyne, Gateshead, Sunderland, Northumberland, South Tyneside, North Tyneside and County Durham, beginning from midnight. Households are banned from mixing, while pubs, bars and restaurants are only permitted to offer table service; they must close between 22:00 and 05:00.
  - Thailand and Singapore are added to the quarantine exemption list, meaning travellers arriving from there will no longer need to self-isolate. Slovenia and Guadeloupe are removed.
- 18 September –
  - The UK government says it is considering a short period of tighter restrictions for England to slow the spread of COVID-19; this would see hospitality businesses closing for a few weeks.
  - Collection of customer / visitor contact details becomes a legal requirement with fixed penalties, applying to operators of many types of business and community centres.
  - Tighter restrictions are announced for Lancashire (excluding Blackpool), Merseyside, Warrington, Halton, Wolverhampton, Oadby, Wigston, parts of Bradford, Kirklees and Calderdale, beginning on 22 September. Households are banned from mixing, hospitality businesses can offer table service only and must close between 22:00 and 05:00. Residents are advised only to use public transport when essential.
  - Mayor of London Sadiq Khan says measures to curb the spread of the virus in London are becoming "increasingly likely".
  - The Office for National Statistics says that new COVID-19 cases may have reached 6,000 a day in England, with a clear rise in cases in those under the age of 35.
  - The New Year's Eve fireworks display in London is cancelled because of the COVID-19 pandemic.
- 19 September – Up to 1,000 fans are allowed to attend eight English Football League matches as part of the government's crowd pilot scheme aimed at reopening spectator sport.
- 20 September –
  - Health Secretary Matt Hancock warns people in England that tougher COVID-19 restrictions will follow if they do not follow the rules.
  - As Lancashire prepares for tighter restrictions from 22 September, tourists have descended on Blackpool for a "last blast" at the coastal resort, despite police urging them not to do so.
  - Labour party leader Sir Keir Starmer calls on Prime Minister Boris Johnson to apologise for the "near collapse" of the government's test and trace system.
- 21 September –
  - Health Secretary Matt Hancock announces that people in areas subject to tighter COVID-19 restrictions are to be allowed to look after children from other households.
  - The UK government announces that pubs and restaurants in England must close at 22:00 from Thursday 24 September and be restricted to table service only by law, with the measures to be outlined by Prime Minister Boris Johnson the following day.
- 22 September –
  - Prime Minister Boris Johnson tells the House of Commons the United Kingdom has reached "a perilous turning point" as he announces new restrictions for England that could last for as long as six months. These include a requirement that all shop staff wear face coverings, and a limit on weddings to fifteen people. Initial fines for rule breaking are increased from £100 to £200. People are also told to work from home if they can.
  - Johnson confirms that plans for spectator sporting events to resume from 1 October will not go ahead.
  - A report into the COVID response implemented by Erlestoke Prison finds that it made the prison "less safe" and "less purposeful".

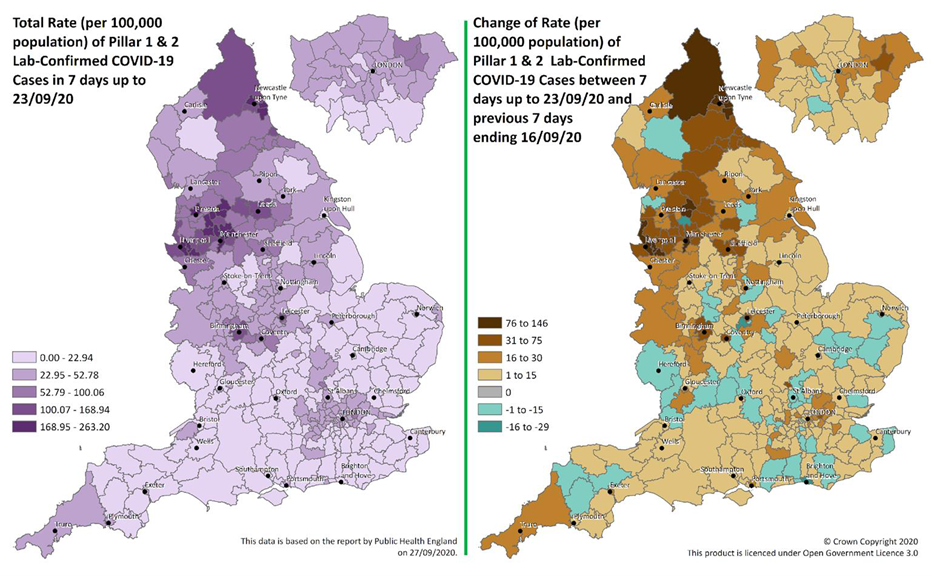
Geographical spread of COVID-19 in England by 23 September 2020

- 23 September –
  - Foreign Secretary Dominic Raab defends new COVID-19 measures following criticism from some scientists who feel they do not to far enough, describing them as "balanced, targeted and proportionate".
  - An English Premier League match between Liverpool and Arsenal is brought forward by fifteen minutes to accommodate for the 10pm pubs curfew, with all future Premiership matches being timed to fit in with the new regulations.
  - Couples who live separately are now permitted to meet up for sex, but casual sex is still banned.
- 24 September – The second version of the NHS contact-tracing app is made available for download by the public in England and Wales.
- 25 September –
  - Different households in Leeds, West Yorkshire are prevented from mixing together in houses and gardens to curb the spread of COVID-19 in the city, the new rules becoming effective from midnight.
  - London is placed on the national coronavirus watchlist following a rise in cases there.
  - 1,700 students at Manchester Metropolitan University are told to self-isolate for 14 days after 99 tested positive for COVID-19.
  - The Department of Health and Social Care announces that emails and SMS messages will be sent to people in England informing them how to download the NHS COVID-19 contact-tracing app.
- 26 September –
  - Steve Chalke, founder of the Oasis Trust which operates 53 schools in England, calls on the pupil premium that helps to educate the poorest children should be trebled because the gap between disadvantaged and non-disadvantaged children "has become a gulf" following lockdown.
  - Demand for COVID tests for children in England has tripled through September, with 1% testing positive.
- 27 September – In the Birmingham area, 100 military personnel are enlisted to support the "drop and collect" COVID-19 testing programme.
- 28 September –
  - The remainder of the regulations (SI 1029) come into force in England, reducing the maximum number who can attend weddings and civil partnership ceremonies and any associated receptions from 30 to 15.
  - Refusing to self-isolate in England after being told to self-isolate becomes illegal, with a fine of up to £10,000. The change in the law comes after a government-commissioned survey found that only 18% of people with symptoms went into self-isolation. Fines for employers who penalise employees for self-isolating will also be introduced.
  - The Test and Trace Support Payment scheme begins. £500 is available to employed people who are asked to isolate by NHS Test and Trace, if they cannot work at home and are receiving certain state benefits or have a low income.
  - Andy Burnham, the Mayor of Greater Manchester, calls for an "urgent review" of the 10pm pub curfew because it is "doing more harm than good" and "creates an incentive for people to gather in the street or more probably to gather in the home".
  - Lockdown measures are further tightened in the North East of England from 30 September to make mixing with other households in any indoor setting illegal and enforceable by fines; the decision comes after COVID-19 cases in the area rise to 100 in 100,000.
- 29 September –
  - The NHS Confederation warns that the health service faces a "triple whammy" of rising COVID-19 cases, a major backlog in treatment and reduced capacity because of COVID measures over the coming winter.
  - The shopworkers' union USDAW warns that 10pm pub closures are putting retail workers at greater risk from verbal abuse, violence and COVID infection, because stores that remain open late are attracting people who wish to buy alcohol, something that poses a potential increase in antisocial behaviour.
  - Prime Minister Boris Johnson announces a "radical" shake up of adult education in England, with adults who do not possess A Level qualifications offered A Levels or equivalent qualifications in subjects valuable to industry.
  - Johnson apologises, saying he "misspoke" after being asked to clarify incoming COVID-19 restrictions for meeting up in the North East of England after a junior minister was unable to do so. Johnson wrongly stated that the rule of six applied in the area, when the restrictions mean households are not permitted to mix in indoor or outdoor settings.
- 30 September – 170 people have tested positive for COVID at a pork processing plant in Cornwall.

=== October 2020 ===
- 1 October –
  - Tighter restrictions are announced for Liverpool, Warrington, Hartlepool and Middlesbrough, making it illegal for households to mix in any indoor setting, including pubs and restaurants. The changes come into place following a continued spike of COVID-19 cases in those areas, and will remain effective for as long as necessary.
  - Doctors in the West Midlands have been told to prepare for a mass COVID vaccination programme from as early as November.
  - BBC News reports that COVID-19 restrictions are to be simplified into a three-tier system following confusion over local rules.
  - 770 students at the University of Northumbria have tested positive for COVID-19, requiring them to self-isolate; 79 of them are symptomatic.
- 3 October – Tighter restrictions come into force in Liverpool, Hartlepool, Middlesbrough and Warrington.
- 4 October –
  - Andy Burnham, the Mayor of Greater Manchester, warns the north of England faces a "winter of dangerous discontent" if the test and trace system does not improve, and calls for local control over test and trace, a local furlough scheme and better support for local authorities if local lockdown measures are to continue.
  - Fallowfield, a suburb of Manchester and home to thousands of students, is now the coronavirus hotspot with the most cases of anywhere in the country. A possible reason for the soaring COVID-19 infection rate is the concentration of student accommodation in the areas around the University of Manchester, Manchester Metropolitan University and Salford University campuses.
- 5 October – According to the Telegraph, a number of university cities experiencing significant COVID-19 infection rate increases, such as Leeds, Exeter, Oxford, Sheffield and Manchester, are poised to be put under more stringent restrictions, even local lockdown measures.
- 6 October –
  - The number of daily COVID-19 hospital admissions in England increases by 478, the largest daily increase since June.
  - Health officials in Nottingham express concerns about a spike in COVID cases in the city, where cases have risen to an average of 384 in every 100,000 over the past seven days.
  - In the House of Commons, the UK government wins a vote on retaining the "rule of six" limit on social gatherings by 287 votes to 17.
  - London now has an infection rate of more than 1,000 new COVID-19 cases a day, with 16 boroughs reporting more than 60 new cases per 100,000 people. The increase is thought to be partly due to an upsurge in testing.
- 7 October –
  - Labour Party leader Keir Starmer challenges Prime Minister Boris Johnson to publish the scientific evidence behind the 10pm closing time ahead of a vote on the issue in the House of Commons.
  - People in Nottinghamshire are asked to avoid mixing with other households indoors amid high rates of COVID-19.
- 8 October –
  - After details of possible new restrictions to close pubs and restaurants in the areas of England most affected by COVID-19 appear in newspapers ahead of any announcement by the government, MPs and local leaders seek clarification on the situation.
  - Figures released by NHS England indicate 111,000 people have been waiting for routine hospital treatment for more than a year, the highest figure since 2008. Almost two million patients have been waiting for more than the target time of 18 weeks.
  - £30m of funding is announced for local authorities to fund COVID measures, including marshals to ensure rules are followed. Police forces in England and Wales are also given £30m to help with enforcing regulations.
  - Data published by Public Health England shows Nottingham to have the highest COVID-19 rate in the UK, with 689.1 cases per 100,000.
  - The Evening Standard reports that London has had 6,723 new COVID-19 infections within the week ending 4 October 2020, an increase of 58.2% on the previous week.
- 9 October –
  - The Imperial College's React study shows the rate at which the coronavirus epidemic is spreading in the north of England is double the pace of the rest of England with faster infection doubling times of 17 days in the North West, 13 days in Yorkshire and the Humber, as opposed to 29 days in England more generally.
  - Scientists present findings that nearly 25% of NHS Trust inpatients with COVID-19 acquired the infection after admission to hospital.
- 10 October –
  - As the government prepares to introduce new measures to fight COVID-19, leaders in the north of England criticise the level of financial support offered by the Chancellor. Mayor of Greater Manchester Andy Burnham says that people will not be surrendered to hardship.
  - Five people are arrested and a police officer is injured at an anti-lockdown protest in London.
- 11 October –
  - Following a decline in the number of people being contacted by NHS Test and Trace, Communities Secretary Robert Jenrick says the government will "fully embrace" local test and trace systems.
  - Five Manchester MPs write a letter to the Prime Minister arguing against plans to introduce a three-tier system for COVID-19 restrictions, and saying that pub closures will not stop infection rates rising.
- 12 October –
  - NHS Nightingale hospitals in Manchester, Sunderland and Harrogate are told to prepare to take patients.
  - It is confirmed that GCSE and A Level exams will go ahead in 2021, but with reduced content on some papers, and with a start date pushed back by three weeks.
- 13 October - Figures reveal that the number of secondary schools disrupted by COVID-19 is increasing, with 21% sending pupils home because of the virus. This figure is an increase from 18% in the previous week, and 8% in mid-September.
- 14 October -
  - The COVID-19 tier regulations come into force, defining three levels of restrictions to be applied as necessary in geographic areas. These replace and revoke the existing local lockdown regulations. The Liverpool City Region is the first to be assigned to the strictest tier.
  - Footage of people gathering in Liverpool two hours before the new regulations are introduced emerges on social media; Joe Anderson, the Mayor of Liverpool, criticises those involved in the gathering, saying they "shame our city".
  - NHS Hospital Trusts in Plymouth, Liverpool and Belfast are cancelling planned elective procedures outright or scaling-back surgery due to an upsurge in COVID-19 patients requiring intensive care.
  - The Joint Biosecurity Centre's Gold Command recommends Greater Manchester and Lancashire be placed under Tier 3 measures, subject to being signed off by Number 10.
- 15 October -
  - Health Secretary Matt Hancock announces in the House of Commons that London, Essex (except Thurrock and Southend), York, North East Derbyshire, Chesterfield, Erewash, Elmbridge, and Barrow in Furness will be moved to Tier 2 "High" alert level, restricting different households mixing indoors from midnight on 16 October.
  - Mayor of Greater Manchester Andy Burnham and local politicians resist plans to put the area into the highest level 3 tier, citing the impact the move would have on the local economy.
- 16 October –
  - Council leaders in Lancashire agree to move the county into tier 3 restrictions from midnight, but unlike the Liverpool City Region gyms will be allowed to remain open.
  - In a press conference at 10 Downing Street, Prime Minister Boris Johnson says the spread of COVID-19 in Manchester is "grave" and he may "need to intervene" if new measures are not agreed.
- 17 October –
  - Protesters march through London to demonstrate against the city's inclusion in tier 2 restrictions.
  - Manchester's restrictions status continues to be unclear as Mayor Andy Burnham rejects a statement from Downing Street that it has arranged talks for the following day.
  - The DHSC reveals that police forces across England are to be given access to Test and Trace data in circumstances where an individual with a positive result has been told to self-isolate and there is evidence of non-compliance "without reasonable justification".
- 18 October –
  - Mayor of Greater Manchester Andy Burnham accuses Boris Johnson of exaggerating the risk of COVID-19 in the area in order to persuade local politicians to agree to go into tier 3 restrictions, and writes a letter to the leaders of the UK's major political parties calling for a Parliamentary debate on the proposals. Cabinet Office Minister Michael Gove warns that restrictions may be imposed if an agreement cannot be reached.
  - Volunteer co-ordinator and trustee, Mezmin Malida, is featured in a Guardian article on how "Locked-down Leicester" feels forgotten.
- 19 October – Communities Secretary Robert Jenrick confirms that political leaders in Manchester have until midday the following day to reach a decision with the government on enter into tier 3 restrictions.
- 20 October –
  - Prime Minister Boris Johnson confirms that Greater Manchester will move to level 3 COVID restrictions from Friday 23 October after failure to reach a deal with local leaders. In response, Andy Burnham says Greater Manchester will face a "punishing" winter.
  - School attendance figures show that at least half of secondary schools in England sent one or more pupils home because of COVID-19 during the previous week.
  - Sadiq Khan, the Mayor of London, calls for the 10pm curfew to be scrapped in London to allow bars and restaurants to deal with the tier 2 restrictions.
- 21 October –
  - Dan Jarvis the Mayor of the Sheffield City Region, announces that South Yorkshire will go into tier 3 restrictions from Saturday 24 October.
  - Prime Minister Boris Johnson announces £60m of funding for Greater Manchester to help it deal with tier 3 restrictions.
  - MPs vote 322–261 to reject a parliamentary motion to provide free school meals to children during holidays until Easter 2021.
- 22 October -
  - Coventry, Stoke-on-Trent and Slough are to move to tier 2 restrictions from Saturday, 24 October 2020, due to surging infection rates with people over the age of 60, in particular, being among the cases.
  - Manchester's Nightingale hospital will reopen from the week commencing 26 October in readiness of the area moving into tier 3 restrictions.
  - Ministers are accused of making decisions favouring London with COVID-19 support, as Rishi Sunak announces a financial package worth billions. Mayor of Greater Manchester, Andy Burnham, points out that the new support is largely similar to what he requested prior to talks breaking down.
  - At a Downing Street press conference, Prime Minister Boris Johnson says he shares "people's frustration" with the turnaround times for the track and trace service, and that the system must improve.
- 23 October –
  - The coronavirus fatality rate in England increases for the first time since the apex of April 2020.
  - A spokesman for Boris Johnson says the Prime Minister is "hopeful" that "some aspects of our lives" could be "back to normal" by Christmas.
  - As the half-term break begins, a number of councils and local businesses around England are offering to provide free meals for schoolchildren during the holiday.
  - A forthcoming rugby union match between England and the Barbarians at Twickenham, scheduled for 25 October, is called off after 12 Barbarians players are stood down for breaking COVID rules.
  - Warrington Borough Council announces that Warrington in Cheshire will go into tier 3 restrictions, with tighter measures scheduled to begin on Thursday 29 October.
- 24 October –
  - As South Yorkshire enters tier 3 restrictions, Sheffield City Region mayor Dan Jarvis urges the UK government to "define precisely what the exit criteria is" from tier 3.
  - Professor Neil Ferguson, a former member of the government's Scientific Advisory Group for Emergencies, says that some school years may need to close in order to control the virus.
  - Eighteen people are arrested at an anti-lockdown protest in central London.
  - Headteachers at some schools in England report that access to free government provided laptops for pupils has been cut.
  - Gloucestershire Police say that during Wales's 17-day lockdown, they will stop people crossing the border from Wales who they suspect are not making an essential journey and advise them to turn back. Those who refuse will have their details passed to police in Wales who can then issue fines.
- 25 October –
  - Following criticism of Test and Trace, the mandatory 14-day quarantine for contacts of people who receive a positive test for COVID-19 may be reduced to 10 days, or even 1 week.
  - A BMA survey of 6,610 physicians reveals that 37% hold the view that the recently implemented tier system in England will be an ineffectual measure.
- 26 October –
  - Prime Minister Boris Johnson rejects mounting calls to reverse the government's decision not to fund free school meals over the half-term holidays.
  - Nottingham is to move into tier 3 restrictions on Thursday, 29 October.
  - With eight million people in England set to be living under tier 3 restrictions by the end of the week, a group of Conservative MPs representing constituencies in the north of England write to the Prime Minister demanding a "clear road-map" out of lockdown.
- 27 October –
  - Warrington enters tier 3 restrictions, the alert level described as "very high", due to rising COVID-19 infection rates.
  - COVID-19 tests that provide a result within an hour are being piloted at universities in England in order to allow students to return home for Christmas.
  - Hospitals in Leeds cancel non-essential operations as the number of COVID-19 patients in the city rises above levels seen earlier in the year.
  - Dudley and Staffordshire are announced as the latest areas to enter tier 2 regulations, though a date for them to do so is not confirmed.
- 28 October –
  - It is confirmed that Nottinghamshire will enter tier 3 restrictions from Friday 30 October, with auction houses, car boot sales, betting shops, saunas and tattoo parlours required to close. Alcohol cannot be served in shops after 9pm, but can be sold "in hospitality venues where accompanying a substantial meal" until 10pm.
  - A loophole in the law causes confusion as to whether alcohol can be served in social clubs in areas under tier 3 restrictions.
  - Opposition parties call for COVID rules to be the same across all four nations for the Christmas period, in response to which Environment Secretary George Eustice says "It's too early to say" what rules will be in place then.
- 29 October –
  - It is confirmed that Oxford is to be placed into tier 2 restrictions from Saturday 31 October after cases there rose to 134.5 in every 100,000 for the week ending 23 October, and that West Yorkshire will be placed into tier 3 restrictions from Monday 2 November.
  - More than 10% of London hospital beds are in use with COVID-19 patients as the NHS comes under pressure due to a second wave.
  - Delia Smith, a celebrity chef and director of Norwich City, writes to Prime Minister Boris Johnson urging him to allow fans to return to football stadiums, citing concern that smaller clubs could be at risk of closure without the return of supporters.
- 30 October –
  - Nottinghamshire moves into tier 3 restrictions. The move is distinctive from most other areas subject to tier 3 restrictions since betting shops, nail salons, tattoo parlour and saunas are required to close.
  - Foreign Secretary Dominic Raab tells the BBC Radio 4 Today programme the UK government is "striving" to avoid "blanket" COVID measures, which he says would not be in the best interests of the country.
  - The Times reports that Prime Minister Boris Johnson will announce a nationwide lockdown for England on Monday 2 November, with the restrictions coming into force as early as Wednesday 4 November and lasting until December.
- 31 October –
  - Business leaders criticise plans for a second lockdown in England, citing the "immense" damage it will do to businesses.
  - After scientists project that there could be several thousand COVID deaths a day, Prime Minister Boris Johnson announces a second month-long lockdown for England, from Thursday 5 November to Wednesday 2 December, in order to prevent what he describes as a "medical and moral disaster" for the NHS. England will then revert to the tier system. The announcement was brought forward by two days (from Monday to Saturday) after leaks to media the previous day; a Sky News report later found a noticeable increase in people making journeys in the five days between the announcement and the start of the new restrictions.
  - Unlike the first lockdown, schools, universities, manufacturing businesses and construction sites will remain open. The English Premier League and other elite sports can also continue behind closed doors during the four week lockdown, it is confirmed.

=== November 2020 ===
- 1 November –
  - Cabinet Office Minister Michael Gove confirms the four-week England lockdown could be extended beyond 2 December.
  - Professor Sir Mark Walport, a member of the government's SAGE advisors, suggests the virus is "unlikely to be completely controlled" by 2 December.
  - Boris Johnson faces a potential rebellion from some of his backbench MPs angry at lockdown measures they describe as "disastrous" to the economy, with Sir Graham Brady, chairman of the 1922 Committee, suggesting up to 80 Conservative MPs may vote against the measures when they are debated in Parliament.
  - Transport for London secures a £1.8bn government bailout to keep bus and tube services running until March 2021.
  - Religious groups criticise the new lockdown rules that ban communal worship.
  - Mayors in some of England's COVID-19 hotspots, including Andy Burnham of Greater Manchester, call for schools and colleges to be closed during the month-long lockdown.
  - Tennis and golf officials urge the government to make their sports exempt from the new lockdown rules amid concerns they are on the brink of collapse.
- 2 November –
  - Boris Johnson tells the House of Commons the UK faces a "medical and moral disaster" without the planned month-long lockdown for England, but that it will end "without a shred of doubt" on 2 December.
  - Chancellor Rishi Sunak announces that self-employed people will be able to claim 80% of their earnings during the lockdown period.
  - Universities advise students not to move home during the lockdown, even if their courses are switched to being taught online.
- 3 November –
  - The Health Protection (Coronavirus, Restrictions) (England) (No. 4) Regulations 2020 are "laid on the table" in parliament, to come into effect for 28 days beginning on 5 November.
  - Liverpool is to pilot a regular COVID-19 rapid testing trial with logistic support from around 2,000 military personnel.
  - Defending impending lockdown restrictions, England's Chief Medical Officer Dr Chris Whitty says that "economically and socially destructive" lockdowns are the only practical option until a vaccine and drugs are found to treat COVID-19.
  - A software defect in the Test and Trace scheme has led to more than 7,200 people in England being told to stop self-isolating on the wrong date.
  - Retailers, including Currys PC World and John Lewis, stay open later in the days preceding lockdown to cope with increased customer demand.
- 4 November –
  - MPs vote 516–39 to support the four-week lockdown restrictions for England, with 34 Conservative MPs among those to vote against the measures, while a further 19 Conservatives abstain from voting.
  - The NHS in England is put on the highest alert level.
  - New guidelines are issued for care homes allowing visitors.
  - For the first time, NHS Test and Trace makes COVID-19 tests available for GPs to use at their discretion, for symptomatic patients, symptomatic staff and their symptomatic household members.
- 5 November –
  - As England's second lockdown begins, the UK Statistics Authority criticises the government over the way it presented data estimating potential COVID deaths to justify the measures at the 31 October Downing Street press conference, and calls for greater transparency of data and the way projections are made.
  - At a Downing Street press conference, Boris Johnson says the four week lockdown should be enough to make a "real impact" on the virus.
  - The University of Manchester apologises after large metal fences were erected around halls of residence on its Fallowfield Campus without warning. The fences are removed again following protests from several hundred students.
  - Police break up an anti-lockdown protest in central London as 104 are arrested.
  - Foreign Secretary Dominic Raab is reported to be self-isolating after coming into contact with a person who had tested positive for COVID-19.
- 6 November – The first trial of city-wide COVID testing gets underway in Liverpool.
- 7 November –
  - The number of testing sites in Liverpool is doubled after 12,000 people are tested at six sites on the first day of the trial.
  - Non-urgent operations are suspended at hospitals in Greater Manchester.
- 9 November -
  - The organisers of a Manchester anti-lockdown demonstration involving 600 people are issued with a £10,000 fine.
- 10 November –
  - COVID mass testing is to be rolled out to a further 67 areas of England, Health Secretary Matt Hancock announces, including Nottinghamshire, Yorkshire and parts of the West Midlands.
  - A report from Ofsted says the COVID crisis has led to a slipping back of learning skills for most children in England, while some have forgotten social skills, such as how to use a knife and fork.
- 11 November –
  - An Evacuation-style operation to get students home safely for Christmas is announced. They will be offered rapid COVID tests, and allocated travel dates in a "student travel window" between 3–9 December.
  - A study by the Northern Health Science Alliance says northern England has been hit worse by the COVID crisis, "exacerbating" regional inequalities.
- 12 November – The number of people waiting for hospital treatment in England for over a year has hit its highest level since 2008, with 140,000 having waited more than 12 months.
- 13 November –
  - Around 90,000 COVID tests have been carried out in Liverpool during the first week of mass testing in the city.
  - Research conducted by the University of Nottingham has found that rapid COVID testing in care homes is as effective as tests carried out in hospitals, prompting researchers to suggest mass testing for care homes would be a "game changer" for residents and their families.
- 14 November –
  - Professor Susan Michie, a government scientific adviser, says the next two weeks will be "absolutely crucial" if England's second lockdown is to be lifted on 2 December, and warns people not to be complacent.
  - Fourteen people are arrested at an anti-lockdown protest in Bristol, and sixteen at a demonstration in Liverpool.
  - Scarborough Council asks people to stay away from the coastal town as COVID rates increase to 565.5 per 100,000.
- 15 November – The Metropolitan Police allow a baptism involving 30 people to go ahead at an Islington church in spite of lockdown regulations prohibiting such gatherings. Two police vans attend the baptism, with officers preventing further people from entering the church, but fifteen people already inside are allowed to continue, while a further fifteen attend an outdoor service.
- 16 November –
  - Dr Susan Hopkins of Public Health England suggests the regional COVID tier system may need to be "strengthened" to get the country "through the winter".
  - Mass testing in Liverpool has discovered 700 COVID cases where those testing positive had no symptoms, Public Health England has announced.
  - Council leaders in Hull write to the Prime Minister to ask for urgent action as COVID cases rise to 770 in 100,000.
  - Andy Marsh, the Chief Constable of Avon and Somerset Police, criticises anti-lockdown marchers who gathered in Bristol over the preceding weekend as "selfish idiots" and "an embarrassment to Bristol".
- 17 November –
  - From 4am, travel rules are relaxed for people arriving in England to work on poultry farms to ensure there is enough turkey available for Christmas.
  - Ministers are reported to be looking at toughening the tier system for England when the second lockdown ends on 2 December.
  - The UK government changes the way it records COVID data for England, resulting in an increase in cases for some areas. The changes involve people, such as students, who have moved location, but whose cases were still being recorded at their home address. Consequently, areas such as Newcastle, York and Lincoln have seen a dramatic increase in case numbers, with those in Newcastle increasing by a quarter.
  - Sources, including BBC News, report the UK government is looking at allowing spectators to return to sports venues in some parts of England as early as Christmas.
  - London Heathrow receives the first transatlantic flight where everyone on board had tested negative for coronavirus prior to boarding at Newark airport, New York.
- 18 November –
  - Research has indicated that one in five of London's black cabs has been taken out of service since June due to a slump in demand for their use because of the COVID crisis.
  - Baroness Dido Harding, the head of NHS Test and Trace, is self-isolating after receiving an alert that she had been in contact with a person who has tested positive for COVID.
- 20 November – A BBC investigation has found that NHS Test and Trace is reaching as little as half of those identified as close contacts in some areas.
- 21 November –
  - Downing Street confirms plans to introduce a tougher three-tier system of COVID restrictions for England when the lockdown ends on 2 December.
  - Sources, including BBC News, report that Chancellor Rishi Sunak is to announce a £500m package to support mental health services in England, which have been in greater demand because of the COVID crisis.
  - Dozens of arrests are made after hundreds attend anti-lockdown protest in Liverpool, and other parts of England.
- 23 November –
  - Prime Minister Boris Johnson confirms that England's three-tier system of COVID regulations will return once the lockdown expires on 2 December, but with toughened measures for each area. Gyms and non-essential shops will reopen throughout England, while collective worship and weddings will be allowed again, as well as some spectator sport. The tier status of each region will be reviewed every 14 days, with the regional approach scheduled to last until March 2021.
  - Up to 4,000 spectators will be allowed at outdoor sporting events from 2 December in the lowest tier areas, with 2,000 allowed in tier 2 areas.
  - Students are to be urged to take two COVID-19 tests three days apart before travelling home, it is announced. But tests will be voluntary, and will not be on offer at all universities.
- 24 November –
  - Transport Secretary Grant Shapps announces that travellers arriving in England from 15 December can reduce their quarantine period by paying for a COVID test after five days.
  - Figures have shown that one in five secondary pupils in England has missed schooling in the past week due to disruption caused by COVID-19.

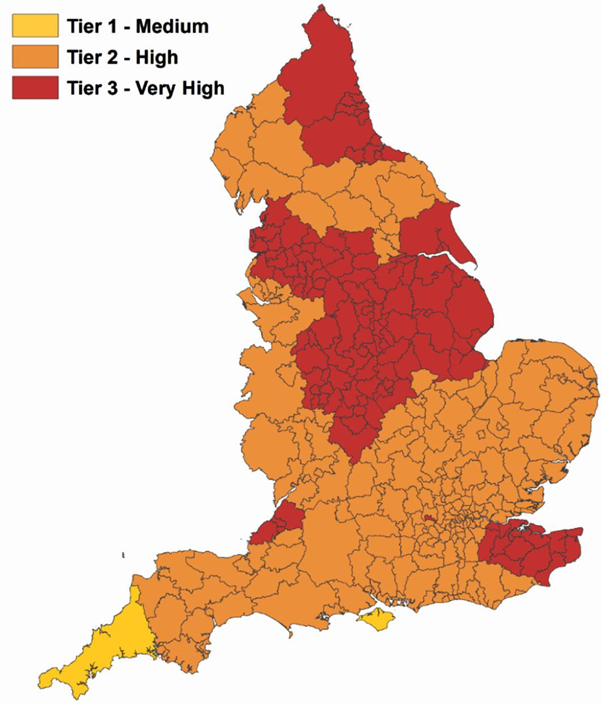
The initial post-lockdown tiers in England, from Wednesday 2 December 2020, were announced on 26 November

- 26 November –
  - England's new tier system is announced, coming into force on 2 December. Most of the country, including London and Liverpool, is put into tier 2, while large parts of the Midlands, North East and North West, including Greater Manchester and Birmingham, are put into tier 3. Only the Isle of Wight, Cornwall and the Isles of Scilly are placed into tier 1.
  - Data for 19–21 November shows that cases are falling in every part of England.
- 27 November –
  - Health officials have warned that plans for mass testing in England threaten to be a distraction to other priorities, such as the rollout of a vaccine.
  - A laboratory error leads to hundreds of people wrongly being told they have tested positive for COVID-19 by NHS Test and Trace.
- 28 November –
  - Writing in The Times, Cabinet Office Minister Michael Gove warns backbench Conservative MPs planning to vote against the new tier system for England that without the measures hospitals throughout the country will become overwhelmed with COVID cases.
  - More than 150 people are arrested at an anti-lockdown protest in London's West End organised by Save Our Rights UK.
- 29 November –
  - Foreign Secretary Dominic Raab says that England's new tier system is needed in order to avoid a third wave of COVID-19.
  - The UK government issues new rules for Christmas permitting door-to-door carol singing and the opening of Santa's Grottos in all tiers, but people in tier 3 will not be able to attend a school Nativity play and will instead have to watch it via livestream or as a recording.
- 30 November –
  - Health Secretary Matt Hancock announces that the lockdown measures in England have helped to bring COVID-19 under control again, with cases having reduced by around 30% during the preceding week, but warns that vigilance is still needed.
  - In a bid to persuade backbench MPs to support the new tier regulations for England, the UK government publishes data behind its decision to introduce the measures, stating that it seeks to "balance the many complex impacts" of restrictions and keep them in place "for as short a time as possible", but that allowing COVID to spread "would lead to impacts...considered intolerable for society". In response, senior Conservative MP Mark Harper claims the "wheels are coming off the government's arguments".
  - The UK government announces a further expansion of community testing in England.
  - Housing Minister Robert Jenrick announces a temporary waiver of planning restrictions on Monday–Saturday shopping hours during December and January.
  - Environment Secretary George Eustice attracts media attention after suggesting pubgoers in the new tier 2 could order a scotch egg with their drink, which would count as a substantial meal.
  - Singer Rita Ora apologises after breaching lockdown rules to celebrate her 30th birthday at a London restaurant.

=== December 2020 ===
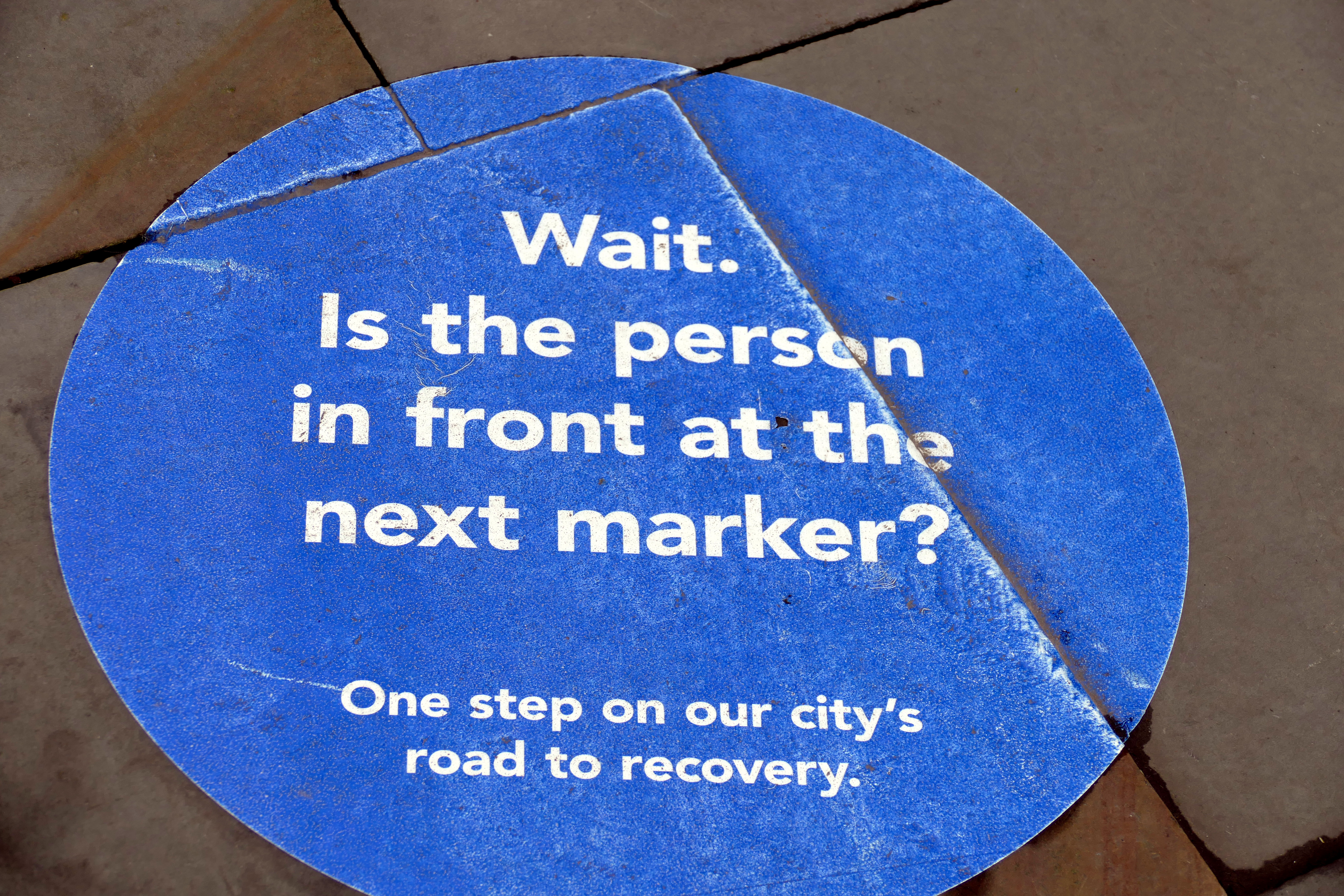
- A sign seen in Manchester in December, 2020
  1 December –
  - MPs vote 291–78 in favour of introducing England's tough new COVID tier system, with 55 backbench Conservatives voting against the government, while another 16 abstain.
  - The UK government announces that relatives of people in care homes in England can visit if they receive a negative COVID-19 test.
  - Prime Minister Boris Johnson announces that pubs forced to close under the new tier system because they do not serve food will be given £1,000 compensation.
  - Stratford-on-Avon District Council will seek a judicial review into the government's decision to place it into tier 3 of the new COVID restrictions.
- 2 December –
  - England's second lockdown ends at 12.01am, and the second tier system is adopted. Gyms, hairdressers and non-essential shops are allowed to reopen.
  - Students in England will have a staggered return to university over five weeks after the Christmas holidays in order to reduce COVID transmission.
  - Fans are allowed to return to English Football League grounds for the first time since March, with spectators attending six venues. Up to 1,000 fans are allowed into Luton and Wycombe, while Carlisle, Charlton, Shrewsbury and Cambridge are allowed to admit 2,000.
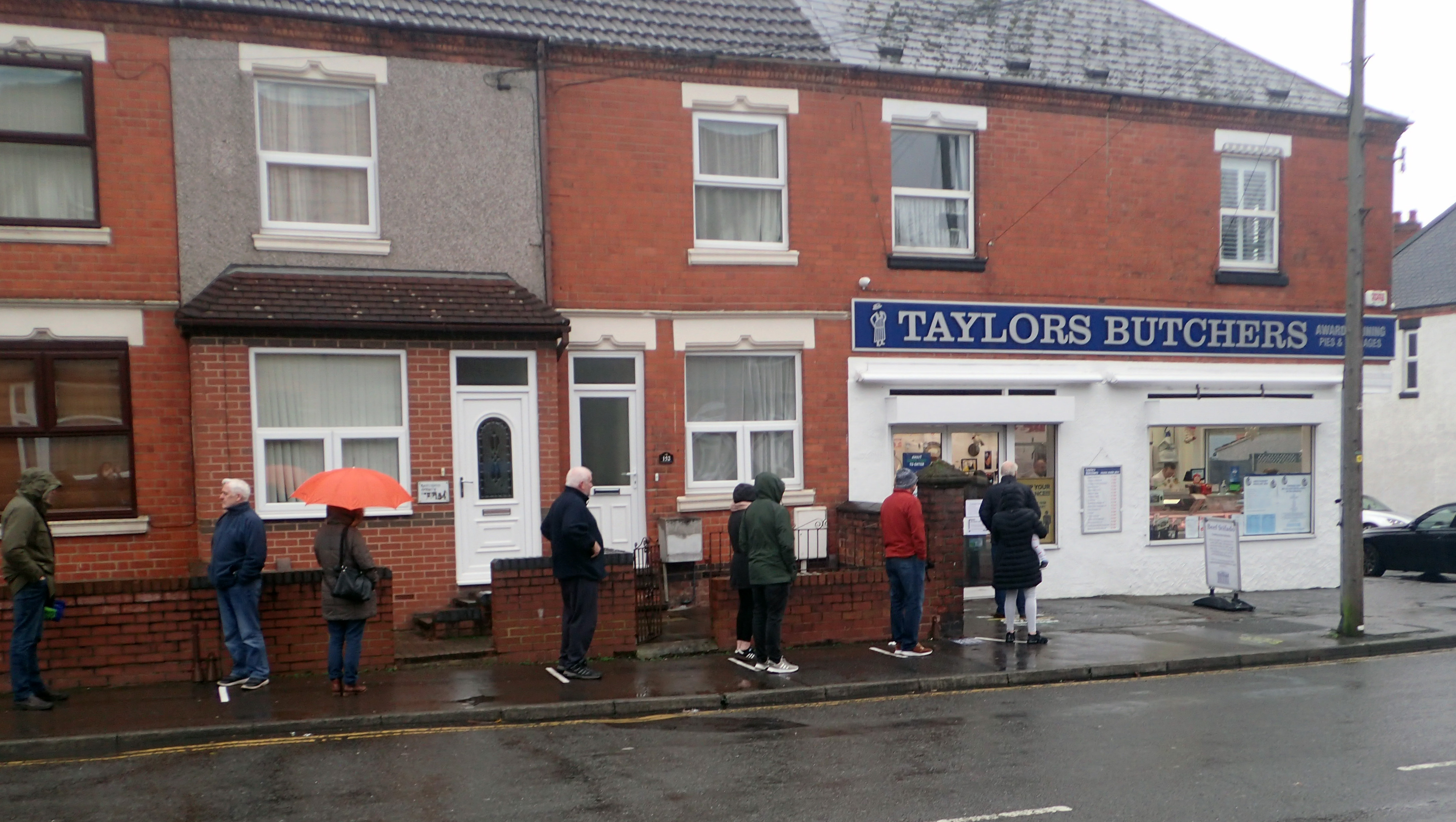
- People queue outside a butcher due to COVID-19 restrictions
  4 December –
  - Figures from the Office for National Statistics indicate COVID-19 rates are falling in every part of England apart from the North East, with 1 in 105 people having the virus in the week up to 28 November, down from 1 in 85 the week before.
  - Councils in Greater Manchester pause rapid COVID testing for care home visitors amid concerns they do not detect enough cases.
  - The Lancashire FA suspends grassroots football in parts of the county until January following talks with local health officials.
- 5 December –
  - GP surgeries will receive supplies of the Pfizer/BioNTech vaccine on 14 December, and have been told to have vaccination centres staffed and ready to deliver the vaccine within three and a half days of that date.
  - Following criticism that the mass COVID testing introduced to tier 3 areas may not be accurate, Dr Susan Hopkins, chief medical adviser to NHS Test and Trace, defends the tests, saying they could identify many cases of infection in people without symptoms.
  - A Christmas market has opened in Nottingham despite concerns from some residents it could lead to a rise in COVID cases. The Nottingham Winter Wonderland was given the go-ahead by Nottingham City Council after organisers said it was safe.
  - The first weekend following the end of lockdown sees an influx of shoppers to high streets as stores hold pre-Christmas sales. In London, police are called to Harrods to deal with a large crowd gathered outside the store; four arrests are made.
- 6 December –
  - Although weekend shopping has returned, figures are reported to be down on 2019.
  - Nottingham's Christmas market is closed a day after it opened amid concerns it could promote the spread of COVID-19.
  - Following criticism of its decision to suspend grassroots football in parts of Lancashire the day before fixtures were scheduled to go ahead, the Lancashire FA defends its eleventh hour decision, saying it communicated the decision as soon as was possible and that its priority is to "protect the community" over Christmas.
- 7 December – England's cricket tour of South Africa is abandoned after two members of the team receive positive COVID tests.
- 8 December – Health Secretary Matt Hancock urges Londoners to adhere to COVID-19 regulations as cases rise in London.
- 9 December – Experts have called for London to be placed into tier 3 COVID restrictions to avoid a spike in cases over Christmas after figures indicated a spike in cases in London on 2 December.
- 10 December –
  - Health Secretary Matt Hancock announces that mass testing will be rolled out for secondary schools in the worst affected areas of London, Kent and Essex.
  - Figures from NHS England show the number of patients in England waiting over a year for routine hospital care is now 100 times higher than before the pandemic.
- 11 December –
  - Figures from the Office for National Statistics for the week ending 5 December indicate COVID cases in England are continuing to fall, apart from in London and the East of England.
  - Andy Burnham, the Mayor of Greater Manchester, expresses his anger after minutes are released of a SAGE from the summer in which they urged the government to provide more COVID funding for the area.
- 12 December –
  - In a letter to Prime Minister Boris Johnson, NHS Providers, the body representing hospital trusts in England, warns that relaxing the COVID tier system could result in a third wave of the virus at the busiest time of year for hospitals.
  - Mass testing is to be rolled out to 67 tier 3 areas beginning on Monday 14 December.
  - Thousands of Christmas shoppers descend on central London following warnings from Sadiq Khan, the Mayor of London, and the police that people should respect COVID regulations.
- 14 December –
  - The self-isolation period for contacts of people with confirmed COVID-19 is shortened from 14 days to 10 days, and the same change applies to those returning travellers who are required to go into quarantine.
  - Health Secretary Matt Hancock announces that London, most of Essex and parts of Hertfordshire will move to tier 3 restrictions from Wednesday 16 December following an increase in COVID cases in the south east and the identification of a new strain of the virus that spreads much quicker.
  - After Greenwich Council writes to headteachers asking them to move classes online amid rising COVID cases, Education Secretary Gavin Williamson orders the authority to keep schools open or face legal action. Greenwich Council reverses its decision the following day.
- 15 December –
  - Mass testing of secondary school pupils will be greatly increased in January with the objective of sending fewer people home. Pupils who come into contact with someone testing positive for COVID-19 will be offered seven days of tests, while teachers will have weekly tests.
  - The Test to Release scheme begins in England, allowing travellers to pay privately for a COVID test five days after arrival, and end their quarantine period if they receive a negative test. But the launch is chaotic as the eleven private firms chosen by the government to administer the tests have teething problems.
- 16 December
  - London, and parts of Essex and Hertfordshire, are placed into tier three of England's COVID tier system following an increase in case numbers in those areas.
- 17 December –
  - Bedfordshire, Buckinghamshire, Berkshire and Hertfordshire, as well as parts of Surrey, East Sussex, Cambridgeshire and Hampshire are to be moved from tier two to tier three from Saturday 19 December, while Bristol and North Somerset will move from tier three to tier two. Herefordshire will be moved from tier two to tier one.
  - Secondary schools in England will have a staggered return in January 2021 as a mass COVID testing programme is introduced; exam pupils will return immediately, with other students facing the prospect of online lessons for the first week.
- 18 December –
  - Prime Minister Boris Johnson says that he hopes to avoid another national lockdown for England, but admits COVID cases have risen "very much".
  - It is reported that nearly 90% of hospital beds in England are full and that health trusts face the prospect of suspending non-COVID treatment.
  - Nicola Mason, a head teacher from Staffordshire, speaks out about how school staff feel "broken" by last minute demands for them to run testing schemes in secondary schools.
- 19 December –
  - Prime Minister Boris Johnson announces that London, South East and East of England are to go into new Tier 4 restrictions from the following day. The rules are mostly the same as the national restrictions in November, with non-essential retail, hairdressers and gyms closing.
  - Plans for Christmas bubbles are scrapped completely in Tier 4, while in the rest of England and Wales Christmas bubbles are limited to meeting up on Christmas Day.
  - Anti-lockdown protests are held in cities across the country, with police making 27 arrests at a protest in London.
- 20 December –
  - Health Secretary Matt Hancock has claimed that the November lockdown did not work, and cannot say when Tier 4 restrictions will be lifted.
  - Metropolitan Police Federation boss Ken Marsh says the new Tier 4 rules do not "make sense" and that police will not "be knocking on people's doors on Christmas Day" to check whether they are being observed.
  - Travel operator Tui suspends flights from Luton Airport because it is in the new Tier 4 area.
  - The Indian Queens Half Marathon is held in Cornwall with around 250 participants. Concern is later expressed that all competitors were allowed to start together rather than being staggered to enable better social distancing.
- 21 December –
  - Sir Patrick Vallance, the UK's chief scientific adviser, suggests that more areas of England will need to go into Tier 4 restrictions to combat the new variant of COVID-19.
  - Health officials in the West Midlands and North West advise anyone travelling from Tier 4 areas of England or from Wales they must self-isolate for ten days in order to help stop the spread of the new variant of COVID.
- 23 December – Health Secretary Matt Hancock announces that Sussex, Oxfordshire, Suffolk, Norfolk, Cambridgeshire, Hampshire (except the New Forest) and parts of Essex and Surrey still in tier three are to be moved to tier four restrictions from Boxing Day. Many other areas will move up a tier to tiers two and three.
- 24 December –
  - Researchers at the London School of Hygiene and Tropical Medicine have suggested schools and universities may need to remain closed after Christmas to help control the spread of the new variant of COVID, as well as tier four restrictions.
  - Figures released by the Office for National Statistics indicate 1 in 85 people in England has COVID, with Figures for the week to 18 December estimating that almost 650,000 people had the virus, up from 570,000 the previous week.
- 25 December – Residents at a care home in Leeds are allowed to meet and embrace relatives for the first time since March following a rapid COVID test trial at the home.
- 26 December – Tier four restrictions are extended in England after rules are briefly relaxed for Christmas Day.
- 27 December –
  - Police break up an illegal rave attended by 100 people in the Shudehill area of Manchester.
  - Government officials have scheduled a meeting for the next day to decide whether to go ahead with the planned reopening of schools in England in January.
  - The London Ambulance Service is reported to have received as many emergency calls on Boxing Day as it did at the height of the pandemic in April.
- 28 December –
  - Health officials express concern for the pressure on the health service in England, where 20,426 people are being treated in hospital for COVID, an increase from around 19,000 during the previous peak in April.
  - Cabinet Office Minister Michael Gove says he is confident the staggered return of secondary schools can happen in January.
- 29 December –
  - An article in the Health Service Journal has claimed that COVID patients in London could be transferred to hospitals in Yorkshire because of strains on capacity in London.
  - It is reported that COVID patients are being treated in ambulances outside hospitals in north east London as pressure grows on health trusts in London.
  - A group of ten people are fined for breach of COVID restrictions after being caught playing dominoes in a restaurant in Whitechapel, east London.
- 30 December –
  - Tier four measures are extended to more parts of England from midnight, with the Midlands, North East, parts of the North West and South West joining London and the South East in the toughest restrictions.
  - Secondary schools in much of England will fully return two weeks later than originally anticipated, with exam year pupils returning on 11 January, followed by the rest of the years on 18 January.
- 31 December –
  - As more areas of England enter tier four restrictions, a total of 44 million people are now living under the toughest measures.
  - Education Secretary Gain Williamson says he wants the delayed start of the next school term to be as "short as possible".
  - The NHS Nightingale London hospital is reactivated and placed on standby ready to receive patients.
  - The Royal London Hospital is in "disaster medicine mode" and "no longer providing high standard critical care", according to an internal memo.
  - It is reported that GPs will be paid £10 for each care home patient who is vaccinated against COVID-19.

== See also ==
- Timeline of the COVID-19 pandemic in England (January–June 2020)
- Timeline of the COVID-19 pandemic in England (2021)
- Timeline of the COVID-19 pandemic in the United Kingdom (January–June 2020)
- Timeline of the COVID-19 pandemic in the United Kingdom (July–December 2020)
- Timeline of the COVID-19 pandemic in the United Kingdom (2021)
- Timeline of the COVID-19 pandemic in Scotland (2020)
- Timeline of the COVID-19 pandemic in Wales (2020)
- Timeline of the COVID-19 pandemic in Northern Ireland (2020)
