= COVID-19 local lockdown regulations in England =

United Kingdom emergency legislation

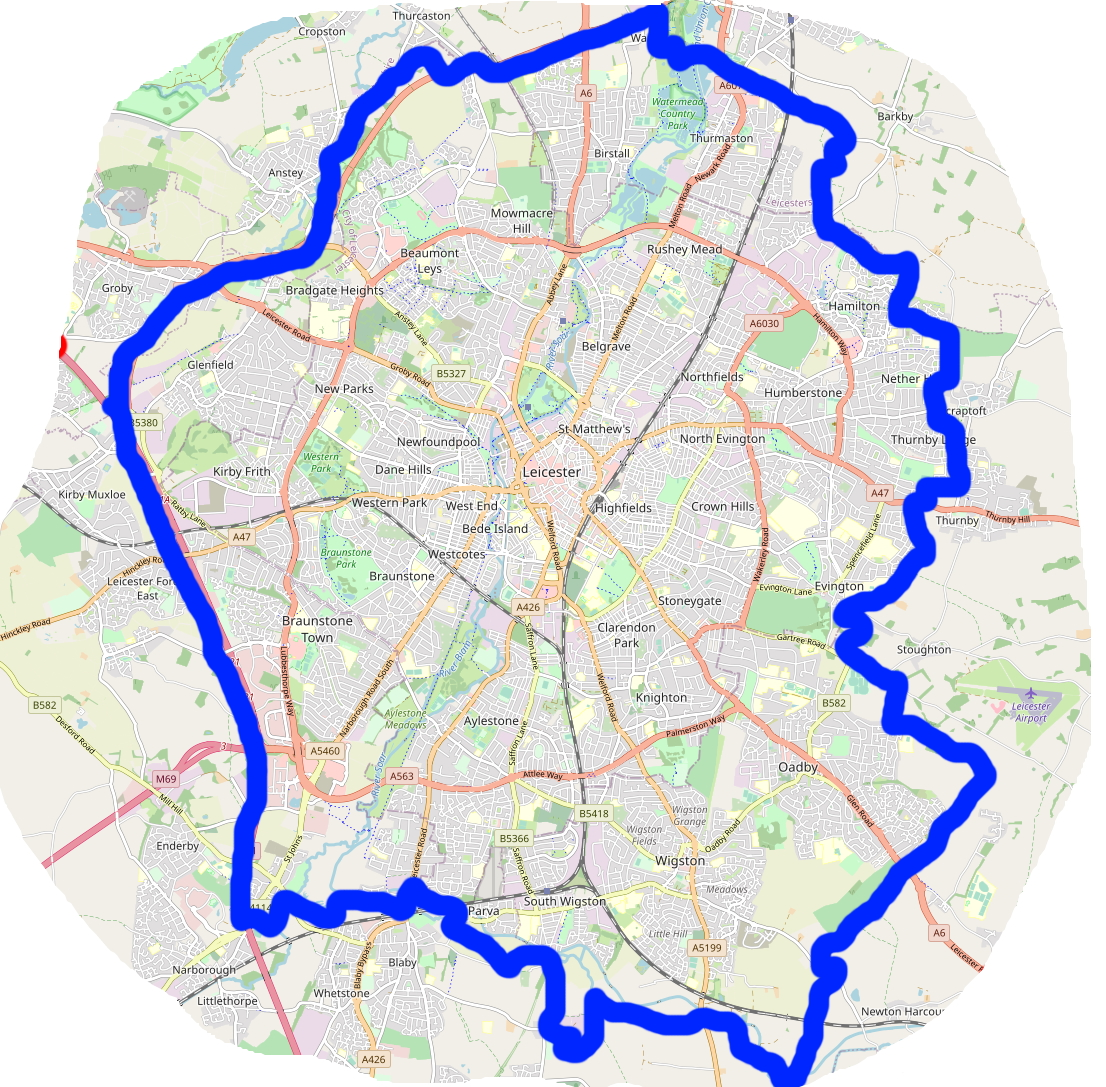
The extent of England's first local lockdown on 4 July 2020: Leicester and the surrounding area

During the COVID-19 pandemic, a variety of restrictive regulations were enforced in England by way of statutory instrument, beginning with country-wide business closures on 21 March 2020, followed by the first national Lockdown Regulations on 26 March. The regulations were modified frequently. By the beginning of July, the government had concluded that restrictions could be removed or eased in most areas, and this was done on 4 July.

Some areas were still of concern, however, and between 4 July and 14 October a series of locally-based regulations, discussed in this article, were introduced. Leicester was the first area to be subject to local restrictions, and many other regions were targeted over the subsequent three months as the situation developed.

Ultimately, the government abandoned its attempts to control the spread of SARS-CoV-2 by piecemeal local regulation. On 14 October 2020, all the regulations discussed below were revoked and replaced with a set of regulations implementing a new national system of three tiers of restrictions across England.

== Context and earlier regulations ==
In response to the developing COVID-19 pandemic the UK government had issued advice to English schools on 12 March 2020 that they should cancel trips abroad, and on 16 March that the public should avoid non-essential travel, crowded places, and visits to care homes. This was followed by the closure of schools, colleges and nurseries from 21 March.

On 21 March the government used emergency powers to make business closure regulations, enforcing the closure in England of businesses selling food and drink for consumption on the premises, as well as a range of other businesses such as nightclubs and indoor leisure centres where a high risk of infection could be expected. Five days later the restrictions were made more extensive. On 26 March 2020 the even more stringent Lockdown Regulations came into force. These became the principal delegated English legislation restricting freedom of movement, gatherings, and business closures, and were progressively relaxed on 22 April, 13 May, 1 June, and 13/15 June. The No. 2 regulations of 4 July 2020 further relaxed the rules throughout most of England, apart from City of Leicester and the surrounding area which became the subject of the first of a series of local regulations.

As described below, between July and September 2020 more extensive and increasingly rigorous ad hoc local regulations were introduced, which in many areas proved unsuccessful in controlling spread of the virus. All of these local regulations were swept away on 14 October 2020, to be replaced by the Tier Regulations.

== Legal basis for the local regulations ==
The local regulations were all introduced by way of statutory instruments made by the Secretary of State for Health and Social Care, Matt Hancock, using emergency powers under the Public Health (Control of Disease) Act 1984, the stated legal basis being "the serious and imminent threat to public health which is posed by the incidence and spread of severe acute respiratory syndrome coronavirus 2 (SARS-CoV-2) in England". In each case, the Secretary of State used section 45R of the Public Health (Control of Disease) Act 1984 to enact the regulations without prior parliamentary consideration, subject to retrospective approval by resolution of each House of Parliament within twenty-eight days.

== Leicester ==
=== Initial regulations, in force 4 July 2020 ===
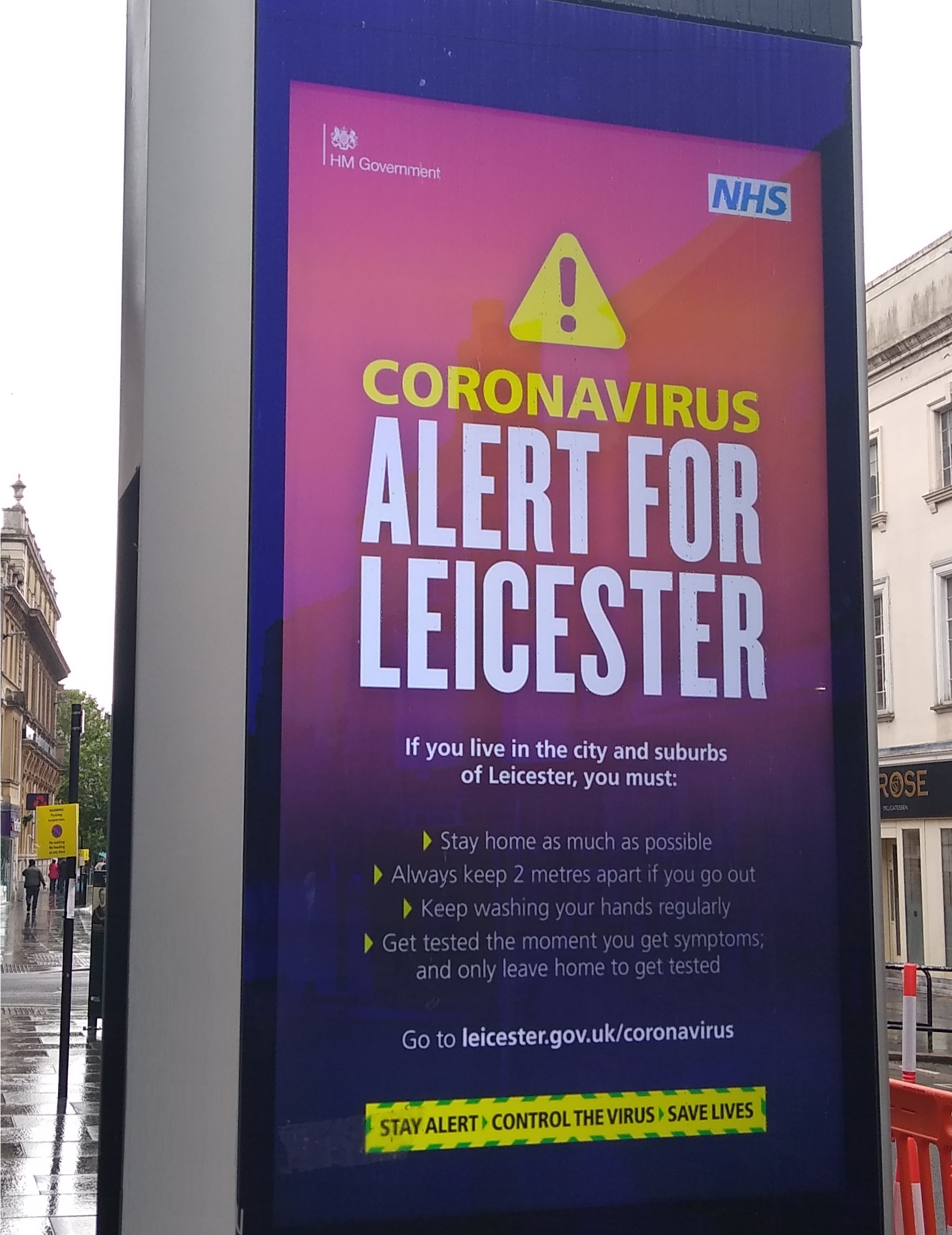
Information poster during the Leicester local lockdown

The Health Protection (Coronavirus, Restrictions) (Leicester) Regulations 2020 (SI 2020/685) were the first local lockdown regulations in England, coming into force on 4 July 2020 on the day that the nationwide regulations were relaxed by The Health Protection (Coronavirus, Restrictions) (No. 2) (England) Regulations 2020 which allowed most retail businesses to re-open and allowed certain gatherings of up to 30 people. Those relaxations were disapplied to the City of Leicester and the surrounding area ("the protected area"), defined by a list of postcode districts.

In contrast to the rest of the country, all non-essential businesses in the protected area had to remain closed, apart from a few exceptions such as garden centres, vehicle showrooms and their outdoor areas. All leisure and recreational facilities (other than outdoor sports courts or amenities) also had to remain closed, with exceptions only for elite athletes. Food and drink establishments were not permitted to make sales for consumption on the premises. Places of worship could open for individual private prayer only.

Households of any size could form a "linked household" with no more than one other household containing exactly one adult and any number of children. The regulations prohibited anyone staying overnight without reasonable excuse within the protected area in a place other than the place where they lived, or where their linked household lived. Individuals living outside the protected area were prohibited without from staying overnight without reasonable excuse at any place within the protected area other than the place where their linked household was living. Certain indoor and outdoor gatherings were also banned.

=== Protected area narrowed, 18 July 2020 ===
SI 2020/685 was amended on 18 July 2020, after 14 days, by the Health Protection (Coronavirus, Restrictions) (Leicester) (Amendment) Regulations 2020 (SI 2020/754). These removed Blaby and Charnwood from the protected area, restricting it to the City of Leicester and the Borough of Oadby and Wigston.

=== Non-essential retail re-opened, 24 July 2020 ===
SI 2020/685 was amended on 24 July 2020, after a further six days, by the Health Protection (Coronavirus, Restrictions) (Leicester) (Amendment) (No. 2) Regulations 2020 (SI 2020/787). These permitted the re-opening of non-essential retail premises, indoor markets in community centres, betting shops, retail galleries, drive-in cinemas, auction houses, and outdoor areas of zoos, safari parks and aquariums.

=== Oadby and Wigston removed, 1 August 2020 ===
SI 2020/685 was amended on 1 August 2020, after a further eight days, by the Health Protection (Coronavirus, Restrictions) (Leicester) (Amendment) (No. 3) Regulations 2020 (SI 2020/823) which removed the Borough of Oadby and Wigston from the protected area, limiting it solely to the City of Leicester.

=== Rules on gatherings changed, 3 August 2020 ===
Two days later, on 3 August 2020, all of the Leicester regulations were repealed and were replaced by the Health Protection (Coronavirus, Restrictions) (Leicester) (No. 2) Regulations 2020 (SI 2020/824). These changed the rules on gatherings, restricting gatherings of more than two people within private dwellings (apart from linked households), but allowing up to 30 elsewhere. Some additional premises were permitted to re-open.

=== Close-contact venues re-opened, 19 August 2020 ===
On 19 August 2020 the Health Protection (Coronavirus, Restrictions) (Leicester) (No. 2) (Amendment) Regulations 2020 (SI 2020/875) allowed the re-opening of outdoor swimming pools and outdoor facilities at water parks, nail bars and salons, tanning booths and salons, spas and beauty salons, massage parlours, tattoo parlours, and body and skin piercing services.

=== Swimming pools and gyms re-opened, 8 September 2020 ===
On 8 September 2020 the Health Protection (Coronavirus, Restrictions) (Blackburn with Darwen and Bradford, Leicester, and North of England) (Amendment) Regulations 2020 (SI 2020/954) permitted the re-opening in Leicester of indoor swimming pools, gyms, sports facilities, and fitness and dance studios.

=== Play areas and conference centres re-opened, 15 September 2020 ===
On 15 September 2020 the Health Protection (Coronavirus, Restrictions) (Leicester) (No. 2) (Amendment) (No. 2) Regulations 2020 (SI 2020/987) permitted the re-opening in Leicester of casinos, indoor skating rinks, indoor play areas (including soft play areas), bowling alleys, conference centres and exhibition halls.

=== Oadby and Wigston added back, 22 September 2020 ===
On 22 September 2020 the Borough of Oadby and Wigston, which had been removed from the protected area on 1 August, was added back.

=== Linked childcare households, 22 September 2020 ===
The concept of 'linked childcare households' was introduced in Leicester and all the local lockdown areas on 22 September 2020 by the Health Protection (Coronavirus, Restrictions) (Protected Areas and Linked Childcare Households) (Amendment) Regulations 2020 (SI 2020/1019). A household with at least one child aged 13 or under could link with another household who was providing informal childcare. In order to link, all adults in both households had to agree. Each household was allowed a single linked childcare household only, which could not be changed; multiple links were not permitted.

As a new exception to the restrictions on gatherings, a household was allowed to meet with its linked childcare household provided that the meeting was reasonably necessary for the provision of informal childcare. This was an additional exception specifically for informal childcare arrangements, not for Registered Childminders who had their own 'education' exception.

=== Revocation, 14 October 2020 ===
These local restrictions were revoked on 14 October 2020 and replaced with regulations implementing a new three-tier system across England.

== Luton, Bedfordshire ==
=== Regulations, in force 25 July 2020 ===
On 25 July 2020 the Health Protection (Coronavirus, Restrictions) (Blackburn with Darwen and Luton) Regulations 2020 (SI 2020/800) came into force in the town of Luton in Bedfordshire. The regulations exempted Luton from the relaxations that were coming into effect in most other areas of England on the same day, under the Health Protection (Coronavirus, Restrictions) (No. 2) (England) (Amendment) (No. 2) Regulations 2020 (SI 2020/788), maintaining tighter restrictions on gatherings and requiring more businesses to remain closed.

=== Revocation, 1 August 2020 ===
The regulations in Luton remained in force for only seven days, and were revoked by The Health Protection (Coronavirus, Restrictions) (Blackburn with Darwen and Bradford) Regulations 2020 (SI 2020/822) on 1 August.

== Blackburn with Darwen, Lancashire ==
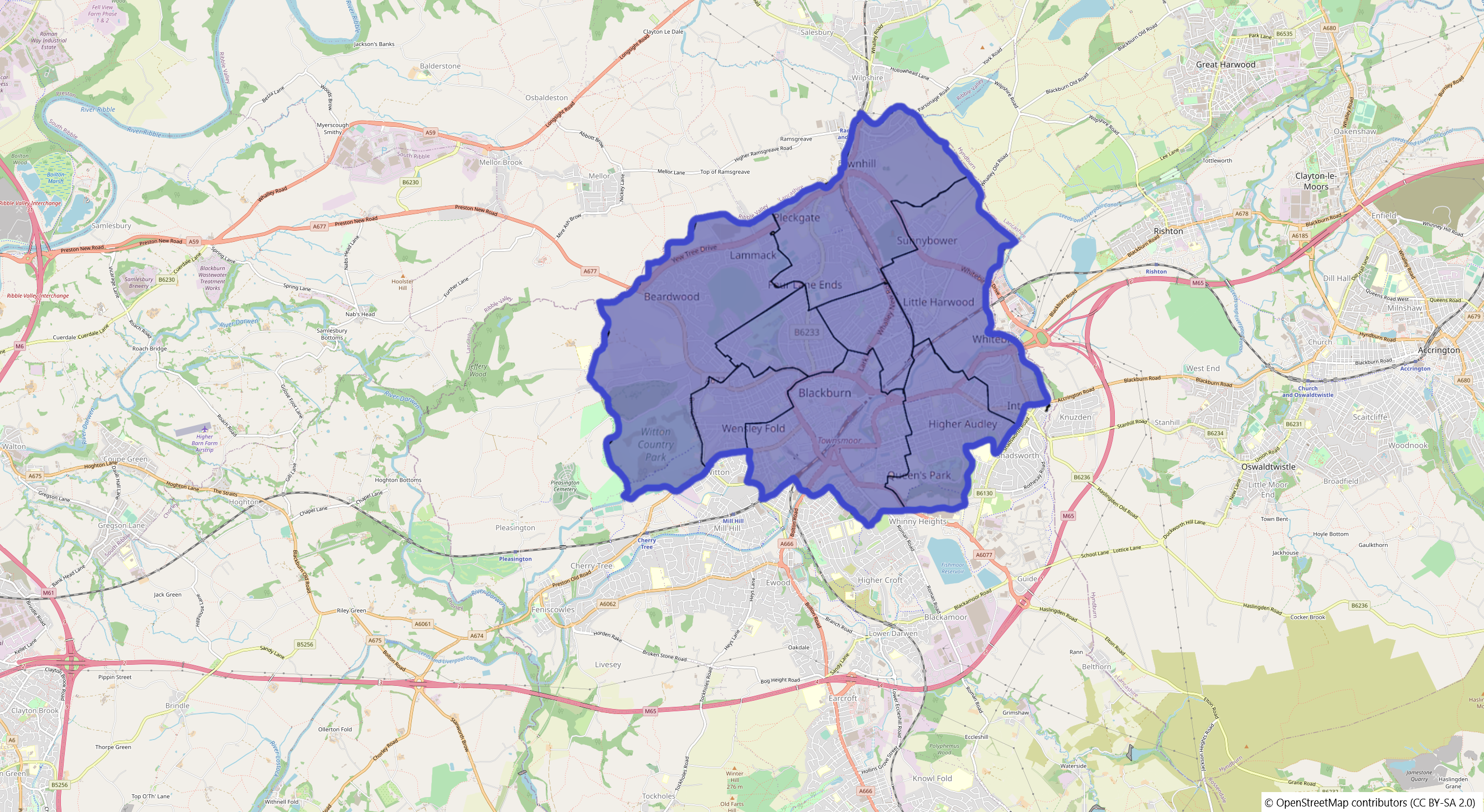
Blackburn with Darwen and the extent of targeted Coronavirus restrictions as at 22 August 2020

=== Initial regulations, in force 25 July 2020 ===
On 25 July 2020 the Health Protection (Coronavirus, Restrictions) (Blackburn with Darwen and Luton) Regulations 2020 (SI 2020/800) came into force in the local authority area of Blackburn with Darwen in Lancashire. The regulations exempted Blackburn with Darwen from the relaxations that were coming into effect in most other areas of England on the same day, under the Health Protection (Coronavirus, Restrictions) (No. 2) (England) (Amendment) (No. 2) Regulations 2020 (SI 2020/788), maintaining tighter restrictions on gatherings and requiring more businesses to remain closed.

=== Replacement regulations, in force 1 August 2020 ===
Eight days later, on 1 August, SI 2020/800 was revoked and was immediately re-enacted without amendment for Blackburn with Darwen as part of the Health Protection (Coronavirus, Restrictions) (Blackburn with Darwen and Bradford) Regulations 2020 (SI 2020/822). (The re-enactment had no effect in Blackburn with Darwen, simply replacing Luton with Bradford in the regulations).

=== Rules aligned with elsewhere, 5 August 2020 ===
SI 2020/822 was amended on 5 August 2020 by the Health Protection (Coronavirus, Restrictions on Gatherings) (North of England) Regulations 2020 (SI 2020/828) to align the rules on gatherings in Blackburn with Darwen with those coming into force in other towns of Northern England.

=== Protected area narrowed, 26 August 2020 ===
SI 2020/822 was amended on 26 August 2020 by the Health Protection (Coronavirus, Restrictions) (Blackburn with Darwen and Bradford) (Amendment) Regulations 2020 (SI 2020/898) to restrict the protected area within Blackburn with Darwen to certain specified wards only.

=== Certain venues re-opened, 8 September 2020 ===
On 8 September 2020 the Health Protection (Coronavirus, Restrictions) (Blackburn with Darwen and Bradford, Leicester, and North of England) (Amendment) Regulations 2020 (SI 2020/954) permitted the re-opening in Blackburn with Darwen of conference centres, exhibition halls, casinos, and bowling alleys; as well as indoor skating rinks, swimming pools, play areas, fitness and dance studios, gyms, and sports facilities.

=== Area aligned with elsewhere, 22 September 2020 ===
On 22 September 2020, following revocation of the Blackburn with Darwen and Bradford Regulations (SI 2020/822) previously covering the area, Blackburn with Darwen was brought into the scope of the North of England Regulations.

=== Revocation, 14 October 2020 ===
These local restrictions were revoked on 14 October 2020 and replaced with regulations implementing a new three-tier system across England.

== Bradford, West Yorkshire ==
=== Initial regulations, in force 1 August 2020 ===
On 1 August 2020 the Health Protection (Coronavirus, Restrictions) (Blackburn with Darwen and Bradford) Regulations 2020 (SI 2020/822) came into force in the city of Bradford, West Yorkshire. These enforced in Bradford the same restrictions that had been imposed eight days earlier on Luton and on Blackburn with Darwen.

=== Area aligned with elsewhere, 5 August 2020 ===
SI 2020/822 was amended on 5 August 2020 by the Health Protection (Coronavirus, Restrictions on Gatherings) (North of England) Regulations 2020 (SI 2020/828) to align the rules on gatherings in Bradford with those coming into force in other towns of Northern England.

=== Protected area narrowed, 2 and 3 September 2020 ===
On 2 September and again on 3 September the protected area within Bradford was restricted to certain wards only by the Health Protection (Coronavirus, Restrictions) (Blackburn with Darwen and Bradford) (Amendment) (No. 2) Regulations 2020 (SI 2020/930) and the Health Protection (Coronavirus, Restrictions) (Blackburn with Darwen and Bradford) (Amendment) (No. 3) Regulations 2020 (SI 2020/935).

=== Certain venues re-opened, 8 September 2020 ===
On 8 September 2020 the Health Protection (Coronavirus, Restrictions) (Blackburn with Darwen and Bradford, Leicester, and North of England) (Amendment) Regulations 2020 (SI 2020/954) permitted the re-opening in Bradford of conference centres, exhibition halls, casinos, and bowling alleys; as well as indoor skating rinks, swimming pools, play areas, fitness and dance studios, gyms, and sports facilities.

=== Area aligned with elsewhere, 22 September 2020 ===
On 22 September 2020, following revocation of the Blackburn with Darwen and Bradford Regulations (SI 2020/822) previously covering the city, Bradford was brought into the scope of the North of England Regulations.

=== Revocation, 14 October 2020 ===
These local restrictions were revoked on 14 October 2020 and replaced with regulations implementing a new three-tier system across England.

== North of England ==
=== Initial regulations, in force 5 August 2020 ===
On 5 August 2020 the areas subject to further local restrictions on gatherings were significantly expanded by the Health Protection (Coronavirus, Restrictions on Gatherings) (North of England) Regulations 2020 (SI 2020/828) to include regions within Greater Manchester, Lancashire, and West Yorkshire. Specifically 'the protected area' of the regulations comprised the city, Metropolitan Borough and Borough Council areas of Bolton, Tameside, Bury, Manchester, Oldham, Rochdale, Salford, Stockport, Trafford, Wigan, Pendle, Hyndburn, Burnley, Rossendale, Calderdale and Kirklees.

With some exceptions (including linked households), the regulations prohibited two or more people from different households gathering in a private dwelling within the protected area; and people living in the area could not participate in any such gathering held outside the area. Gatherings outside private dwellings of more than 30 people were also restricted.

The regulations did not bring in any additional business closures, leaving that to be dealt with under the general rules for England set out in the Health Protection (Coronavirus, Restrictions) (No. 2) (England) Regulations 2020 (SI 2020/684), as amended.

=== Protected area extended, 8 August 2020 ===
The protected area was expanded to include Preston on 8 August 2020 by the Health Protection (Coronavirus, Restrictions on Gatherings) (North of England) (Amendment) Regulations 2020 (SI 2020/846).

=== Businesses to remain closed, 15 August 2020 ===
On 15 August 2020 the scope of SI 2020/828 was widened by the Health Protection (Coronavirus, Restrictions on Gatherings) (North of England) (Amendment) (No. 2) Regulations 2020 (SI 2020/865) to allow for the enforcement of new local business closures in addition to the regulation of gatherings. Casinos, indoor skating rinks, indoor play areas including soft play areas, and conference centres and exhibition halls were permitted to reopen elsewhere from 15 August by the Health Protection (Coronavirus, Restrictions) (No. 2) (England) (Amendment) (No. 3) Regulations 2020 (SI 2020/863), but had to remain closed within the 'North of England' protected area.

=== Protected area narrowed, 26 August 2020 ===
SI 2020/828 was amended on 26 August 2020 by the Health Protection (Coronavirus, Restrictions) (North of England) (Amendment) Regulations 2020 (SI 2020/897) to remove Wigan and Rossendale from the protected area.

=== Protected area narrowed, 2 September 2020 ===
On 2 September 2020 the Health Protection (Coronavirus, Restrictions) (North of England) (Amendment) (No. 2) Regulations 2020 (SI 2020/931) removed from the protected area the towns of Stockport, Burnley and Hyndburn, as well as parts of Calderdale and Kirklees.

=== Certain venues re-opened, 8 September 2020 ===
On 8 September 2020 the Health Protection (Coronavirus, Restrictions) (Blackburn with Darwen and Bradford, Leicester, and North of England) (Amendment) Regulations 2020 (SI 2020/954) permitted the re-opening in the protected area of conference centres, exhibition halls, casinos and bowling alleys; as well as indoor skating rinks and play areas. These facilities, however, had to remain closed within the area of Bolton Metropolitan Borough Council. On 10 September a new set of regulations (SI 2020/974) was introduced covering Bolton alone (see below).

=== Certain venues re-opened, 22 September 2020 ===
On 22 September 2020, following revocation of the Blackburn with Darwen and Bradford Regulations (SI 2020/822) previously covering the city, Bradford was brought into the scope of these regulations. Local restrictions were removed from Pendle and Preston, but re-imposed throughout the council areas of Calderdale and Kirklees where they had been partially relaxed on 1 September. Casinos, indoor skating rinks, indoor play areas, bowling alleys, conference centres and exhibition halls could re-open.

=== Linked childcare households, 22 September 2020 ===
The concept of 'linked childcare households' was introduced in all the local lockdown areas on 22 September 2020, enabling two households to become linked for the purposes of informal childcare. (See Leicester for details).

=== Protected area extended, 26 September 2020 ===
The protected area was expanded to include Stockport, Wigan and Leeds on 26 September 2020 by the Health Protection (Coronavirus, Restrictions) (Protected Areas and Restriction on Businesses) (Amendment) Regulations 2020 (SI 2020/1041).

=== Consolidation with North West of England, 30 September 2020 ===
On 30 September a number of areas in the North West that were subject to restrictions under the regulations relating to the North East and North West of England were transferred to the North of England regulations by the Health Protection (Coronavirus, Restrictions) (North of England, North East and North West of England and Obligations of Undertakings (England) etc.) (Amendment) Regulations 2020 (SI 2020/1057).

=== Revocation, 14 October 2020 ===
These local restrictions were revoked on 14 October 2020 and replaced with regulations implementing a new three-tier system across England.

== Greencore Food to Go Ltd ==
=== Regulations, in force 29 August ===
On 29 August 2020 the Health Protection (Coronavirus, Restrictions) (Greencore) Regulations 2020 (SI 2020/921) came into effect, targeting not a geographical area but the workers for a specific company, namely Greencore Food to Go Ltd. Subject to a few exceptions, the regulations required anyone whose main place of work between 7 and 21 August was one of two specified Greencore premises in Northampton to self-isolate for a period of one and two weeks starting on 29 August. Members of workers' households were also required to self-isolate.

=== Expiry, 26 September 2020 ===
The regulations expired after 28 days, on 26 September 2020.

== Bolton ==
On 10 September 2020 the Health Protection (Coronavirus, Restrictions) (Bolton) Regulations 2020 (SI 2020/974) significantly increased restrictions within the area of Bolton Metropolitan Borough Council.

=== Business closures and restricted opening hours ===
In addition to the existing closure of nightclubs, dance halls, sexual entertainment venues, conference centres, exhibition halls, casinos, bowling alleys, indoor skating rinks and play areas, the regulations required the closure once again of all restaurants, cafes, bars and pubs offering food and drink for consumption on the premises.

Most retail shops were required to close between the hours of 10 pm and 5 am, as were many public venues including cinemas, theatres, bingo halls, concert halls, museums and galleries, indoor visitor attractions and leisure centres, hairdressers, betting shops, nail bars, tanning and beauty salons, tattoo parlours, massage parlours, playgrounds, social clubs, zoos, adventure and theme parks. Some retail shops were excluded, including food retailers, newsagents and petrol stations.

=== Restrictions on gatherings ===
All gatherings (of two or more people) in a private dwelling or garden were prohibited unless the individuals were members of a common household or of a single linked household, or the gathering was reasonably necessary for certain permitted purposes such as work, education or child care. Two households could be permanently 'linked' for this purpose where one household consisted of exactly one adult (no more) plus any number of children; the second could consist of any number of adults and children.

Most other types of gathering (indoor and outdoor) of more than six people were also prohibited unless all the individuals were of a common or two linked households, or the gathering was reasonably necessary for certain permitted purposes such as work, education or child care. Also permitted were certain gatherings arranged by a company, charity or political body where a formal risk assessment had been carried out.

=== Linked childcare households, 22 September 2020 ===
The concept of 'linked childcare households' was introduced in all the local lockdown areas on 22 September 2020, enabling two households to become linked for the purposes of informal childcare. (See Leicester for details).

=== Opening hours restricted, 26 September 2020 ===
From 26 September 2020 the Health Protection (Coronavirus, Restrictions) (Protected Areas and Restriction on Businesses) (Amendment) Regulations 2020 (SI 2020/1041) all food and drink takeaways (selling food and drink prepared on the premises for immediate consumption off the premises) had to close between 22:00 and 05:00, apart from supermarkets, convenience stores, pharmacists and petrol stations.

=== Revocation, 14 October 2020 ===
These local restrictions were revoked on 14 October 2020 and replaced with regulations implementing a new three-tier system across England.

== Birmingham, Sandwell and Solihull ==
=== Initial regulations, in force 15 September 2020 ===
On 15 September 2020 further local restrictions were enforced by the Health Protection (Coronavirus, Restrictions) (Birmingham, Sandwell and Solihull) Regulations 2020 (SI 2020/988). These disapplied the standard Rule of six regulations that applied elsewhere in England and replaced them with more onerous restrictions within the areas of Birmingham, Sandwell and Solihull.

Within the protected area, all gatherings (of two or more people) in a private dwelling or garden were prohibited unless the individuals were members of a common household or of a single linked household, or the gathering was reasonably necessary for certain permitted purposes such as work, education or child care. Two households could be permanently 'linked' for this purpose where one household consisted of exactly one adult (no more) plus any number of children; the second could consist of any number of adults and children.

=== Protected area extended, 22 September 2020 ===
On 22 September 2020 Wolverhampton was added to the protected area.

=== Linked childcare households, 22 September 2020 ===
The concept of 'linked childcare households' was introduced in all the local lockdown areas on 22 September 2020, enabling two households to become linked for the purposes of informal childcare. (See Leicester for details).

=== Revocation, 14 October 2020 ===
These local restrictions were revoked on 14 October 2020 and replaced with regulations implementing a new three-tier system across England.

== North East and North West of England ==
=== Initial regulations, in force 18 September 2020 ===
On 18 September 2020 further local restrictions were introduced across a wide area of North East England by the Health Protection (Coronavirus, Restrictions) (North East of England) Regulations 2020 (SI 2020/1010), and the follow-up regulations Health Protection (Coronavirus, Restrictions) (North East of England) (Amendment) Regulations 2020 (SI 2020/1012) which corrected some typographical errors. Specifically 'the protected area' of the regulations covered Durham, Gateshead, Newcastle, Northumberland, North Tyneside, South Tyneside and Sunderland.

=== Business closures and restricted opening hours ===
Nightclubs, dance halls, discos and sexual entertainment venues had to remain closed. Certain businesses were subject to restricted opening hours, and were prohibited from opening between the hours of 10pm and 5am. These included businesses offering food and drink for consumption off the premises, restaurants, cafes, pubs, bars, social clubs, bowling alleys, cinemas, theatres, concert halls, indoor leisure facilities, funfairs, adventure parks, casinos and bingo halls. Where such businesses served food and drink for consumption on the premises during permitted opening hours they could serve only customers sitting at tables.

=== Restrictions on gatherings ===
All gatherings (of two or more people) in a private dwelling or garden were prohibited unless the individuals were members of a common household or of a single linked household, or the gathering was reasonably necessary for certain permitted purposes such as work, education or child care. Two households could be permanently 'linked' for this purpose where one household consisted of exactly one adult (no more) plus any number of children; the second could consist of any number of adults and children.

=== Protected area extended, 22 September 2020 ===
On 22 September 2020, the following regions were added to or added back to the protected area: Burnley, Chorley, Fylde, Halton, Hyndburn, Knowsley, Lancaster, Liverpool, Pendle, Preston, Ribble Valley, Rossendale, Sefton, South Ribble, St Helens, Warrington, West Lancashire, Wirral and Wyre.

Following revocation of the Blackburn with Darwen and Bradford Regulations (SI 2020/822) previously covering that area, Blackburn with Darwen was brought into the scope of these regulations.

=== Linked childcare households, 22 September 2020 ===
The concept of 'linked childcare households' was introduced in all the local lockdown areas on 22 September 2020, enabling two households to become linked for the purposes of informal childcare. (See Leicester for details).

=== Protected area extended, 26 September 2020 ===
The protected area was expanded to include Blackpool on 26 September 2020 by the Health Protection (Coronavirus, Restrictions) (Protected Areas and Restriction on Businesses) (Amendment) Regulations 2020 (SI 2020/1041).

=== Consolidation with North of England and further restrictions, 30 September 2020 ===
On 30 September a number of areas in the North West that were subject to restrictions under these regulations were transferred to the North of England regulations by the Health Protection (Coronavirus, Restrictions) (North of England, North East and North West of England and Obligations of Undertakings (England) etc.) (Amendment) Regulations 2020 (SI 2020/1057).

For those areas remaining as protected areas under these regulations, further restrictions were imposed on gatherings in private dwellings and indoor settings to prevent two or more persons from meeting in a private dwelling other than for certain specific reasons.

Amendments were made to the Health Protection (Coronavirus, Restrictions) (Obligations of Undertakings) (England) Regulations 2020 (SI 2020/1008) to ensure that the obligations placed on hospitality venues were aligned with the further restrictions on gatherings where located in protected areas subject to the North East and North West of England regulations.

=== Revocation, 14 October 2020 ===
These local restrictions were revoked on 14 October 2020 and replaced with regulations implementing a new three-tier system across England.

== Enforcement ==
Breaches of all the above regulations were offences and could be prosecuted or dealt with by fixed penalty notices. With effect from 24 September 2020, the penalties were doubled by the Health Protection (Coronavirus, Restrictions) (No. 2) (England) (Amendment) (No. 5) Regulations 2020 (SI 2020/1029), starting from £200 for the first offence (halved to £100 for prompt payment), and increasing on a sliding scale to a maximum of £6,400 for a sixth or subsequent offence.

== Ney report, August 2020 ==
The Secretary of State for Housing, Communities and Local Government commissioned a rapid review of the work of the Leicester and Leicestershire councils during the local outbreak, in order to share good practices and identify scope for improvement, both locally and nationally. The review began on 5 August and a report by Dame Mary Ney was submitted on 21 August. Nine "learning points" and six areas of good practice were highlighted.

== See also ==
- Coronavirus Act 2020
- List of statutory instruments of the United Kingdom, 2020

== Bibliography ==
- "SI 350". Legislation.gov.uk. 26 March 2020. The Health Protection (Coronavirus, Restrictions) (England) Regulations 2020.
- "SI 684". Legislation.gov.uk. 4 July 2020. The Health Protection (Coronavirus, Restrictions) (England) (No. 2) Regulations 2020.
- "SI 685". Legislation.gov.uk. 4 July 2020. The Health Protection (Coronavirus, Restrictions) (Leicester) Regulations 2020.
- "SI 754". Legislation.gov.uk. 18 July 2020. The Health Protection (Coronavirus, Restrictions) (Leicester) (Amendment) Regulations 2020.
- "SI 787". Legislation.gov.uk. 24 July 2020. The Health Protection (Coronavirus, Restrictions) (Leicester) (Amendment) (No. 2) Regulations 2020.
- "SI 800". Legislation.gov.uk. 25 July 2020. The Health Protection (Coronavirus, Restrictions) (Blackburn with Darwen and Luton) Regulations 2020.
- "SI 822". Legislation.gov.uk. 1 August 2020. The Health Protection (Coronavirus, Restrictions) (Blackburn with Darwen and Bradford) Regulations 2020.
- "SI 823". Legislation.gov.uk. 1 August 2020. The Health Protection (Coronavirus, Restrictions) (Leicester) (Amendment) (No. 3) Regulations 2020.
- "SI 824". Legislation.gov.uk. 3 August 2020. The Health Protection (Coronavirus, Restrictions) (Leicester) (No. 2) Regulations 2020.
- "SI 828". Legislation.gov.uk. 5 August 2020. The Health Protection (Coronavirus, Restrictions on Gatherings) (North of England) Regulations 2020.
- "SI 846". Legislation.gov.uk. 8 August 2020. The Health Protection (Coronavirus, Restrictions on Gatherings) (North of England) (Amendment) Regulations 2020.
- "SI 863". Legislation.gov.uk. 15 August 2020. The Health Protection (Coronavirus, Restrictions) (No. 2) (England) (Amendment) (No. 3) Regulations 2020.
- "SI 865". Legislation.gov.uk. 15 August 2020. The Health Protection (Coronavirus, Restrictions on Gatherings) (North of England) (Amendment) (No. 2) Regulations 2020.
- "SI 875". Legislation.gov.uk. 19 August 2020. The Health Protection (Coronavirus, Restrictions) (Leicester) (Amendment) (No. 2) Regulations 2020 (SI 875).
- "SI 897". Legislation.gov.uk. 26 August 2020. The Health Protection (Coronavirus, Restrictions) (North of England) (Amendment) Regulations 2020 (SI 897).
- "SI 898". Legislation.gov.uk. 26 August 2020. The Health Protection (Coronavirus, Restrictions) (Blackburn with Darwen and Bradford) (Amendment) Regulations 2020.
- "SI 921". Legislation.gov.uk. 29 August 2020. The Health Protection (Coronavirus, Restrictions) (Blackburn with Darwen and Bradford) (Amendment) Regulations 2020.
- "SI 930". Legislation.gov.uk. 2 September 2020. The Health Protection (Coronavirus, Restrictions) (Blackburn with Darwen and Bradford) (Amendment) (No. 2) Regulations 2020.
- "SI 931". Legislation.gov.uk. 2 September 2020. The Health Protection (Coronavirus, Restrictions) (North of England) (Amendment) (No. 2) Regulations 2020.
- "SI 935". Legislation.gov.uk. 2 September 2020. The Health Protection (Coronavirus, Restrictions) (Blackburn with Darwen and Bradford) (Amendment) (No. 3) Regulations 2020.
- "SI 954". Legislation.gov.uk. 8 September 2020. The Health Protection (Coronavirus, Restrictions) (Blackburn with Darwen and Bradford, Leicester, and North of England) (Amendment) Regulations 2020.
- "SI 974". Legislation.gov.uk. 10 September 2020. The Health Protection (Coronavirus, Restrictions) (Bolton) Regulations 2020.
- "SI 987". Legislation.gov.uk. 15 September 2020. The Health Protection (Coronavirus, Restrictions) (Leicester) (No. 2) (Amendment) (No. 2) Regulations 2020.
- "SI 988". Legislation.gov.uk. 15 September 2020. The Health Protection (Coronavirus, Restrictions) (Birmingham, Sandwell and Solihull) Regulations 2020.
- "SI 1010". Legislation.gov.uk. 18 September 2020. The Health Protection (Coronavirus, Restrictions) (North East of England) Regulations 2020.
- "SI 1019". Legislation.gov.uk. 22 September 2020. The Health Protection (Coronavirus, Restrictions) (Protected Areas and Linked Childcare Households) (Amendment) Regulations 2020.
- "SI 1029". Legislation.gov.uk. 23 September 2020. The Health Protection (Coronavirus, Restrictions) (No. 2) (England) (Amendment) (No. 5) (England) Regulations 2020.
- "SI 1041". Legislation.gov.uk. 26 September 2020. The Health Protection (Coronavirus, Restrictions) (Protected Areas and Restriction on Businesses) (Amendment) Regulations 2020.
