= Kurt =

- Pronunciation: English: /kɜːrt/ kurt German: [kʊʁt] Norwegian: [ˈkʉʈː] Swedish: [ˈkɵʈː]
- Gender: Male

Origin
- Languages: German; Kurdish
- Meaning: "Bold counsel" (Germanic) "Wolf" (Turkish) "Your son" (Kurdish)

Other names
- Related names: Konrad, Conrad, Kurd

Kurt is a male given name in Germanic languages. Kurt originated as short forms of the Germanic Konrad/Conrad, depending on geographical usage, with meanings including counselor or advisor. Like Conrad, it can also be a surname and less uncommon variations in Germanic languages including Cord, Curd, Cordt, Curth, Kord, Kort, Kurth, and Kurtu. Curd/Kurd is the decent of the Medes.

In Turkish, Kurt means "wolf" and is a surname and less commonly a given name in numerous Turkic countries. Kurt is also the turkish word for Kurd.

Kurt in Kurdistan meaning your son.

== People ==
- Kurt Aland (1915–1994), German theologian and biblical scholar
- Kurt Angle (born 1968), American wrestler
- Kurt Asle Arvesen (born 1975), Norwegian racing cyclist
- Kurt Ballou (born 1974), American guitarist and producer
- Kurt Barling (born 1961), British professor of journalism
- Kurt Beck (born 1949), German politician (SPD)
- Kurt Benkert (born 1995), American football player
- Kurt Bevacqua (born 1947), American baseball player
- Kurt Biedenkopf (1930–2021), German politician (CDU)
- Kurt Browning (born 1966), Canadian figure-skater
- Kurt Burnette (born 1955), American Ruthenian Catholic bishop of the Eparchy of Passaic
- Kurt Busch (born 1978), American NASCAR driver
- Kurt Cobain (1967–1994), American musician, frontman of the band Nirvana
- Kurt Daluege (1897–1946), German SS general and police official
- Kurt Damrow (born 1962), American politician
- Kurt Darren, South African Afrikaans singer
- Kurt Demmler (1943–2009), German songwriter accused of sexual abuse
- Kurt Engel (1909–1942), Austrian pianist
- Kurt Epstein (1904–1975), Czech water polo player
- Kurt Equiluz (1929–2022), Austrian classical tenor in opera and concert
- Kurt Feldman (born 1984), American musician, composer, producer and multi-instrumentalist
- Kurt Gerstein, German SS officer and member of Waffen-SS
- Kurt Gödel (1906–1978), German mathematician
- Kurt Gregor (1907–1990), German socialist politician
- Kurt Großkurth (1909–1975), German actor and singer
- Kurt Hahn (1886–1974), German educator, creator of Outward Bound
- Kurt Hamrin (born 1934), Swedish football player
- Kurt Harland (born 1963), American musician, audio engineer and lead singer of the band Information Society
- Kurt Heegner (1893–1965), German mathematician
- Kurt Hensel (1861–1941), German mathematician
- Kurt Hinish (born 1999), American football player
- Kurt Holman, Canadian politician
- Kurt James (born 1972), American musician
- Kurt Jara (born 1950), Austrian football player and coach
- Kurt Jäger (born 1961), Secretary-General of the European Free Trade Association (EFTA)
- Kurt Kafentzis (born 1962), American football player
- Kurt Georg Kiesinger (1904–1988), German politician, Chancellor of West Germany 1966–1969
- Kurt Körner (1912–1949), German ski jumper
- Kurt Krenn (1936–2014), Austrian bishop
- Kurt (Kubrat) (632–665 AD), Bulgar statesman
- Kurt Kuenne (born 1973), American filmmaker, known for the documentary Dear Zachary
- Kurt Lamm (1919–1987), German-born American soccer player, coach, manager, and administrator
- Kurt Loder (born 1945), American media correspondent
- Kurt Looby (born 1984), Antiguan basketball player
- Kurt Mann (born 1993), Australian rugby league project
- Kurt Masur (1927–2015), German conductor
- Kurt Meyer (1910–1961), German commander
- Kurt Mørkøre (born 1969), Faroese footballer
- Kurt Nilsen (born 1978), Norwegian singer
- Kurt Petersen (inventor) (born 1948), American businessman
- Kurt Pompe (1899–1964), German Nazi SS concentration camp commandant
- Kurt Rambis (born 1958), Greek-American basketball coach and former player
- Kurt Reidemeister (1893–1971), German mathematician
- Kurt Roberts (born 1988), American shot putter
- Kurt Russell (born 1951), American actor
- Kurt Sanmark (1927–1990), Finnish author
- Kurt von Schleicher (1882–1934), German general and politician, Chancellor of Germany 1932–1933
- Kurt Fritz Schneider (1902–1985), German circus performer in the USA
- Kurt Hugo Schneider (born 1988), also known as KHS, American film director, producer, singer and songwriter
- Kurt Schneider (1887–1967), German psychiatrist
- Kurt Schneider (aviator) (1888–1917), German World War I flying ace
- Kurt Schneider (athlete) (1900–1988), German athlete
- Kurt Schwertsik, Austrian composer
- Kurt Schwitters (1887–1948), German painter
- Kurt Sinette (born 1974), Trinidad and Tobago boxer
- Kurt Sonnenfeld (1921–1997), Austrian musician and composer
- Kurt Spenrath (born 1976), Canadian filmmaker
- Kurt Sterneck (1919–1998), Austro-German actor and radio play narrator
- Kurt Stettler (1932–2020), Swiss footballer
- Kurt Student (1890–1978), German air force general
- Kurt Suzuki (born 1983), American baseball player
- Kurt Tucholsky (1890–1935), German journalist
- Kurt Ulrich (1905–1967), German film producer
- Kurt Vile (born 1980), American singer and songwriter
- Kurt Vonnegut (1922–2007), American writer
- Kurt Voss (born 1963), American film director
- Kurt Waldheim (1918–2007), Austrian politician, UN Secretary General 1972–1981, convicted Nazi war criminal
- Kurt Warburton, English mixed martial arts fighter
- Kurt Warner (born 1971), American football player
- Kurt Weill (1900–1950), German-American composer
- Kurt Westergaard (1935–2021), Danish cartoonist
- Kurt Widmer (1940–2023), Swiss bariton
- Kurt Wolff (aviator) (1895–1917), German flying ace
- Kurt Wolff (publisher) (1887–1963), German publisher
- Kurt Wubben (born 1972), Dutch marathon ice speed skater
- Kurt Wuelper, American politician
- Kurt Zehe (1913–1969), German-Russian professional wrestler and actor
- Kurt Zouma (born 1994), French footballer

== Fictional characters ==
- Colonel Kurt Von Strohm, in the BBC sitcom 'Allo 'Allo!
- Kurt-051, in the novel Halo: Ghosts of Onyx
- Kurt Barlow, in the novel 'Salem's Lot
- Kurt Hummel, in the TV series Glee
- Kurt Wagner (comics), also known as Nightcrawler, Marvel comic book superhero
- Kurt Wallander, detective in the works of Henning Mankell

== See also ==
- Curt
