= Geza Tarjanyi =

British conspiracy theorist

- Occupation: Conspiracy theorist
- Movement: Conspiracism
- Criminal charges: Public order offence, assault, harassment
- Criminal penalty: Suspended prison sentence

Geza Tarjanyi (born 1961) is a British conspiracy theorist and anti-fracking campaigner and former DJ and children’s entertainer,,best known for confronting public figures, including former Health Secretary Matt Hancock and deputy chief medical officer Professor Jonathan Van Tam. He is also known for his opposition to 5G mobile networks, mask-wearing and promoting misinformation about the COVID-19 pandemic.

During 2025 he often claimed to have been preparing a Report for public use which could be used for court cases to bring down the Government but as of 2 February 2026 it had not been published in any public forum.

== Opposition to fracking ==
In October 2016 Sajid Javid overturned Lancashire County Council's rejection of plans for a fracking site near Little Plumpton. Tarjanyi was part of a group of activists who argued that the government’s decision to overrule the council was unlawful because it incorrectly applied the relevant planning laws.

Tarjanyi has said that his concerns about fracking began after an earthquake with a magnitude of 2.3 hit Blackpool in 2011 causing damage to his home. After this incident he dedicated his life to protesting, resulting in a hunger strike, a 15 day walk to Downing Street and numerous court appearances.

== Misinformation about COVID-19 ==
Tarjanyi has campaigned for the use of hydroxychloroquine (an anti-malarial drug that has been in use since the 1950s) as a remedy for COVID-19. Speaking at an anti-mask protest at Picadilly Gardens, Manchester, he said: "Boris knows that treatment with hydroxychloroquine has been proven to cure covid... Now Boris knows about the treatment, we are holding him personally accountable for every coronavirus-related death that occurs from now,".

== Anti-lockdown protests ==
Tarjanyi opposes laws intended to stop the spread of COVID-19. He has organised protests outside Downing Street, and in British cities.

In a protest in the city of Durham, he was seen holding a white flag reading the word 'TRUTH'. He addressed the small audience for around half an hour branding Prime Minister Boris Johnson a "traitor". Tarjanyi urged the small crowd to put a white flag outside their businesses to show opposition to COVID regulations, saying: "Believe me folks, we are very, very close to bringing down this government, the police know it, the judges know it, the country knows it and even Boris Johnson knows it."

In June 2021 Tarjanyi was one of ten protesters who were convicted and fined for failing to identify themselves to police officers during an event in Liverpool.

During the second lockdown, Tarjanyi was fined for defying the national stay at home order. He was in Liverpool city centre on 7 November 2020 despite living in Leyland. He was seen in St George's Place, Liverpool without reasonable excuse to be there. He was fined £1,760 and ordered to pay costs of £100 and a £176 victim surcharge.

On 9 October 2020 he took part in the "Oxford Peaceful Political Rally" organised in partnership with Piers Corbyn's Stop the New Normal Campaign. Stated goals of this rally included ending social distancing, test and trace, mask-wearing and 5G.

=== Verbal abuse of Professor Van-Tam and Chris Whitty ===
On 22 June 2021, Tarjanyi posted Facebook videos of himself shouting at Jonathan Van-Tam, the deputy chief medical officer. He accused Mr Van-Tam of "lying to the British people" and asked "what was really in that needle that you put into Matt Hancock?" Tarjanyi also accused Hancock of "murdering millions" during a physical confrontation on the London Underground.

Matt Hancock appeared in person as a witness in June. The MP told the court: "I felt physically intimidated and felt like I needed to get to a place of safety; he was being completely unreasonable."

On a previous occasion, Tarjanyi had posted videos he had filmed of a confrontation with Chris Whitty, the nation's chief medical officer.

On 19 July 2021, Metropolitan Police said that they were dropping charges of harassment and trespass on a protected site.

On 2 August 2023, a judge at Westminster Magistrates' Court found Tarjanyi "deliberately intimidated and harassed" the MP on two separate occasions on 19 and 24 January. Tarjanyi was given an 8 week suspended prison sentence.

== Disruption of Lancashire Fringe Festival play ==
In 2020 Tarjanyi disrupted a performance of "Nannas With Banners", a play about women protesting fracking. The play was staged as part of the Lancashire Fringe Festival. He said he decided to protest against the play because he believed that he had the play "demonised" and "laughed at" him.

Tarjanyi walked onto the stage shouting: "I've seen enough of this lie, stop the lie. This is a lie, You're a liar Tina Rothery." Tarjanyi knocked over a stage light. Members of the audience attempted to apprehended him, and he was eventually ejected from the building.

During the trial he claimed Greenpeace and Green Party are "sucking donations" away from his own organisation and claimed that he was the victim of assault by the play's audience. Tarjanyi was convicted of a public order offence. He appealed his conviction but did not attend the hearing.
