= Walter Ziffer =

Czech-American author and Holocaust survivor (born 1927)

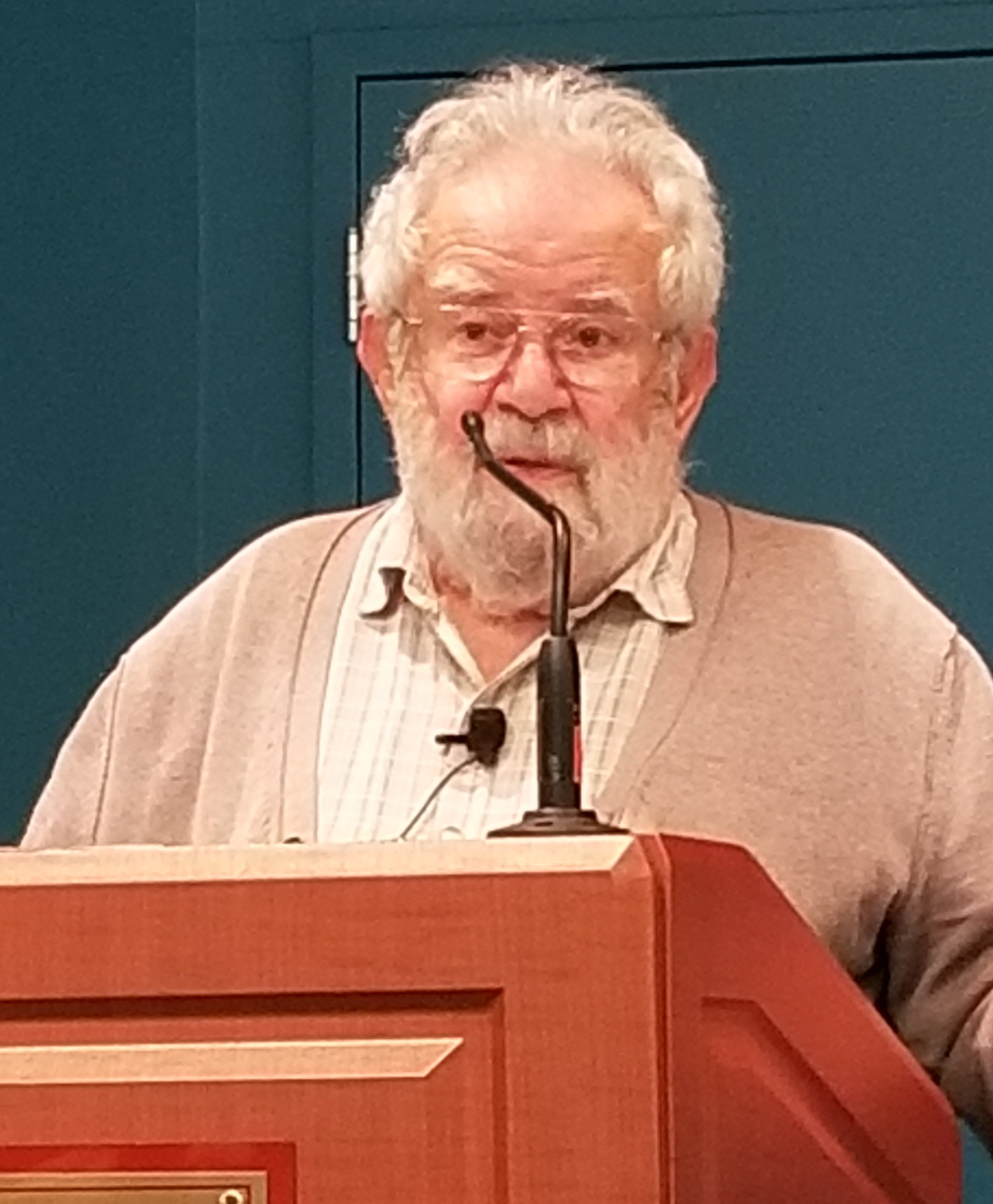
Ziffer speaking at Asheville–Buncombe Technical Community College in 2018

Walter Ziffer (born 5 March 1927) is a Czech-American author, engineer, and Holocaust survivor. He is the author of multiple books, including Confronting the Silence: A Holocaust Survivor's Search for God, and has spoken regularly throughout western North Carolina about his experiences in the Holocaust.

== Early life ==
Ziffer was born in Těšín, Czechoslovakia. In 1942, as a young teenager, he was seized from his home and taken to a Jewish Ghetto in what is now the Czech Republic. Soon after arriving in the Jewish Ghetto, he fell in love with a blonde girl named Lydia, and spent nearly all of his free time with her. After a few weeks of being together, Lydia told Walter that she and her family were going to attempt to flee the ghetto and seek asylum in the Soviet Union. Before she left, she gave him a golden pendant from her necklace engraved with the words "I love you". Days after Lydia's escape, members of the Jewish community informed Ziffer's father that Lydia and her parents had been killed.

Soon separated from his family, Ziffer was sent to seven Nazi concentration camps throughout the war. In his book Confronting the Silence: A Holocaust Survivor's Search for God, Ziffer tells many stories about his time in the camps. During his time in a camp in Brande, located in Silesia, Poland, he was favored by an inmate commander named Pompe. This commander provided him with extra bread that had been stolen from other inmates. He was forced to do things like clean up dead bodies within the wash barracks. Some of his engineering skills dated from his time while enslaved working in factories.

== Immigration and later life ==
At the age of 18, he was finally liberated by Soviet troops and eventually was able to reunite with his parents and some of his siblings. He returned home and apprenticed as a mechanic, then years later moved to the U.S. with only five dollars to his name. After immigrating to the United States, Ziffer received an engineering degree from Vanderbilt University, two master's degrees from the Graduate School of Theology of Oberlin College and a doctorate in theology from the University of Strasbourg in early Christian history, Biblical Hebrew and comparative religion. He worked as an engineer for General Motors.

In Ziffer's later years, his work mostly revolved around his teachings and lecturing at various higher education institutions and writings regarding Christianity's views towards Judaism, and guest lecturing about his experiences in the Holocaust. He published The Birth of Christianity from the Matrix of Judaism: From Jewish Sect to World Religion in 2006 and The Teaching of Disdain: An Examination of Christology and New Testament Attitudes Toward Jews in 2017 regarding historical points of intersection between Christianity and Judaism which caused negativity and hatred.

In his personal memoir, Confronting the Silence: A Holocaust Survivor's Search for God, he expands upon his conviction that he does not believe that God or a higher power saved him from death during the Holocaust, but rather that it was pure luck that he survived the seven concentration camps to which he was sent. He once said in an interview, "I cannot subscribe to their view of attributing my survival to God's protection. I do not and wish not to see me singled out in some way by God from the rest of world Jew[s], of whom one-third perished by Hitler and his henchmen during the Holocaust. How could God make me survive while one and a half million innocent children went to their death without God intervening on their behalf?"
