= Prathama Blood Centre =

Blood bank in Ahmedabad

Coordinates: 23.022°N 72.3230°E

Prathama
- Formation: 2000
- Type: non-profit
- Location: Ahmedabad
- Region served: Gujarat
- Website: प्रथमा

Prathama Blood Centre (Prathama means first in Sanskrit) is a blood bank situated at Ahmedabad, Gujarat, India jointly established in 2000 by the Ahmedabad Municipal Corporation and the Advanced Transfusion Medicine Research Foundation as a non-profit organisation. About 50,000 blood donors donate blood annually at Prathama which is India's first fully automated blood centre.

On World Thalassemia Day 2016, Prathama introduced Nucleic acid testing (NAT) of donated blood to reduce the risk of transfusion transmitted infections (TTIs) in people receiving blood. Transfusion of unsafe blood that has not been screened increases the risk of Transfusion Transmitted Infections (TTIs) and can at times be life-threatening. NAT has proven effective in detecting such window period infections. Safe blood plays a life saving role in Thalassemia patients who need blood at regular intervals. Thalassemia prevalence in India is 3-4%, with 10,000 to 12,000 reported thalassemia births taking place every year. It is also estimated that there are 30 million thalassemia carriers in the country. With NAT tested blood, these patients live longer and maintain their quality of life.

The blood centre is designed to expand in a modular manner to accommodate 150,000 units of blood per annum. About 125,000 blood and blood components are distributed annually. The centre launched its Thalassemia Eradication Program in January 2009.
