= Kurt Petersen =

Kurt Petersen may refer to:

- Kurt Petersen (American football) (born 1957), American football guard
- Kurt Petersen (inventor) (born 1948), American inventor and entrepreneur
- Kurt W. Petersen (born 1934), Danish speedway rider
