= GeneXpert MTB/RIF =

Tuberculosis disgnostic and antibiotic sensitivity test

Sites providing rapid tuberculosis diagnostics per million people

The Xpert MTB/RIF is a cartridge-based nucleic acid amplification test (NAAT) for rapid tuberculosis diagnosis and rapid antibiotic sensitivity test. It is an automated diagnostic test that can identify Mycobacterium tuberculosis (MTB) DNA and resistance to rifampicin (RIF). It was co-developed by the laboratory of Professor David Alland at the University of Medicine and Dentistry of New Jersey (UMDNJ), Cepheid, and Foundation for Innovative New Diagnostics, with additional financial support from the US National Institutes of Health (NIH).

In December 2010, the World Health Organization (WHO) endorsed the Xpert MTB/RIF for use in tuberculosis (TB) endemic countries. The announcement followed 18 months of assessing its field effectiveness in tuberculosis, MDR-TB, and TB/HIV co-infection. The test may enable the diagnosis of TB in patients likely to be missed by traditional tests.

According to the Centers for Disease Control and Prevention (CDC) in 2015, the Xpert MTB/RIF test was "revolutionizing TB control by contributing to the rapid diagnosis of TB disease and drug resistance. The test simultaneously detects Mycobacterium tuberculosis complex (MTBC) and resistance to rifampin (RIF) in less than 2 hours. In comparison, standard cultures can take 2 to 6 weeks for MTBC to grow and conventional drug resistance tests can add 3 more weeks."

== Description ==
The Xpert MTB/RIF detects DNA sequences specific for Mycobacterium tuberculosis and rifampicin resistance by polymerase chain reaction. It is based on the Cepheid GeneXpert system, a rapid, simple-to-use nucleic acid amplification test (NAAT). The Xpert® MTB/RIF purifies and concentrates Mycobacterium tuberculosis bacilli from sputum samples, isolates genomic material from the captured bacteria by sonication and subsequently amplifies the genomic DNA by PCR. The process identifies most of the clinically relevant Rifampicin resistance inducing mutations in the RNA polymerase beta (rpoB) gene in the Mycobacterium tuberculosis genome in a real time format using fluorescent probes called molecular beacons. Results are obtained from unprocessed sputum samples in 90 minutes, with minimal biohazard and very little technical training required to operate. This test was developed as an on-demand near patient technology which could be performed even in a doctor's office if necessary.

A review to assess the diagnostic accuracy of Xpert TB found that when used as an initial test to replace smear microscopy it had pooled sensitivity of 89% and specificity of 99% . However, when Xpert TB was used as an add-on for cases of negative smear microscopy the sensitivity was only 67% and specificity 99%. In a clinical study conducted the sensitivity of the MTB/RIF test on just 1 sputum sample was 92.2% for culture-positive TB; 98.2% for smear+ and culture-positive cases; and 72.5% for smear-negative, culture-positive cases, with a specificity of 99.2%. Sensitivity and higher specificity were slightly higher when 3 samples were tested.

== Cost ==
In August 2012, a public-private partnership including the President's Emergency Plan for AIDS Relief, United States Agency for International Development, Unitaid, and the Gates Foundation announced a subsidy plan that reduced the cost of GeneXpert MTB/RIF for TB testing from $16.86 to $9.98 in developing countries, as the higher price was impeding usage. The Gates Foundation made an initial $3.5 million payment to subsidize the price reduction.

In 2020, Cepheid announced a price of US$19.80 per COVID-19 test in developing countries. Prices are higher in middle-income countries; GeneXpert TB tests cost $55–82 per cartridge in Indonesia. Doctors Without Borders stated that that price was not affordable in countries where people live on less than $2/day. They estimated that the cost to Cepheid of providing the test is as low as $3, and called the offered price profiteering, asking that Cepheid make a more moderate profit by selling the tests for US$5 each.

The Treatment Action Group (TAG) noted that the public had funded the development and deployment of the tests and requested the same price reduction for all the tests using the same technique, including HIV, tuberculosis, and Hepatitis C virus, as the costs are similar regardless of the disease. TAG noted that the cartridges for testing for COVID-19 were twice the price of nearly-identical cartridges for tuberculosis. The International Union Against Tuberculosis and Lung Disease also gave public support.

Organizations worldwide joined the "Time for $5" campaign.

In September 2023, a campaign was launched by author and vlogger John Green to continue the fight to lower the cost of TB cartridges to $5.

One week later, the price of the Xpert MTB/RIF TB test cartridge was reduced from $9.98 to $7.97 in high TB-burden countries. However, the price of the Xpert MTB/XDR test used to diagnose for drug-resistant TB, which is the deadliest form, remained unchanged at $14.90.

== Using for COVID-19 testing ==
In August 2020, Vietnam Ministry of Health had approved the use of GeneXpert, that has been used in Vietnam tuberculosis prevention network since 2012, for COVID-19 testing. According to Nguyen Viet Nhung, director of the National Lung Hospital in Hanoi, the test is similar to RT-PCR, gives accurate results within 35–45 minutes for both COVID-19 and tuberculosis, and could work automatically. It is also used for COVID-19 testing at six sites across Somalia. GeneXpert works as a rapid test for COVID-19 with a processing time of around 45 mins and with less cost.

== See also ==
- Cepheid Inc. (the manufacturer)
