= GeneXpert Infinity =

Nucleic acid amplification test

The GeneXpert Infinity is an automated cartridge-based nucleic acid amplification test (NAAT) which is able to tell whether the subject fluid contains shreds of the SARS-CoV-2 virus, amongst others. It is manufactured by Cepheid Inc.
