= Cepheid (company) =

American molecular diagnostics company

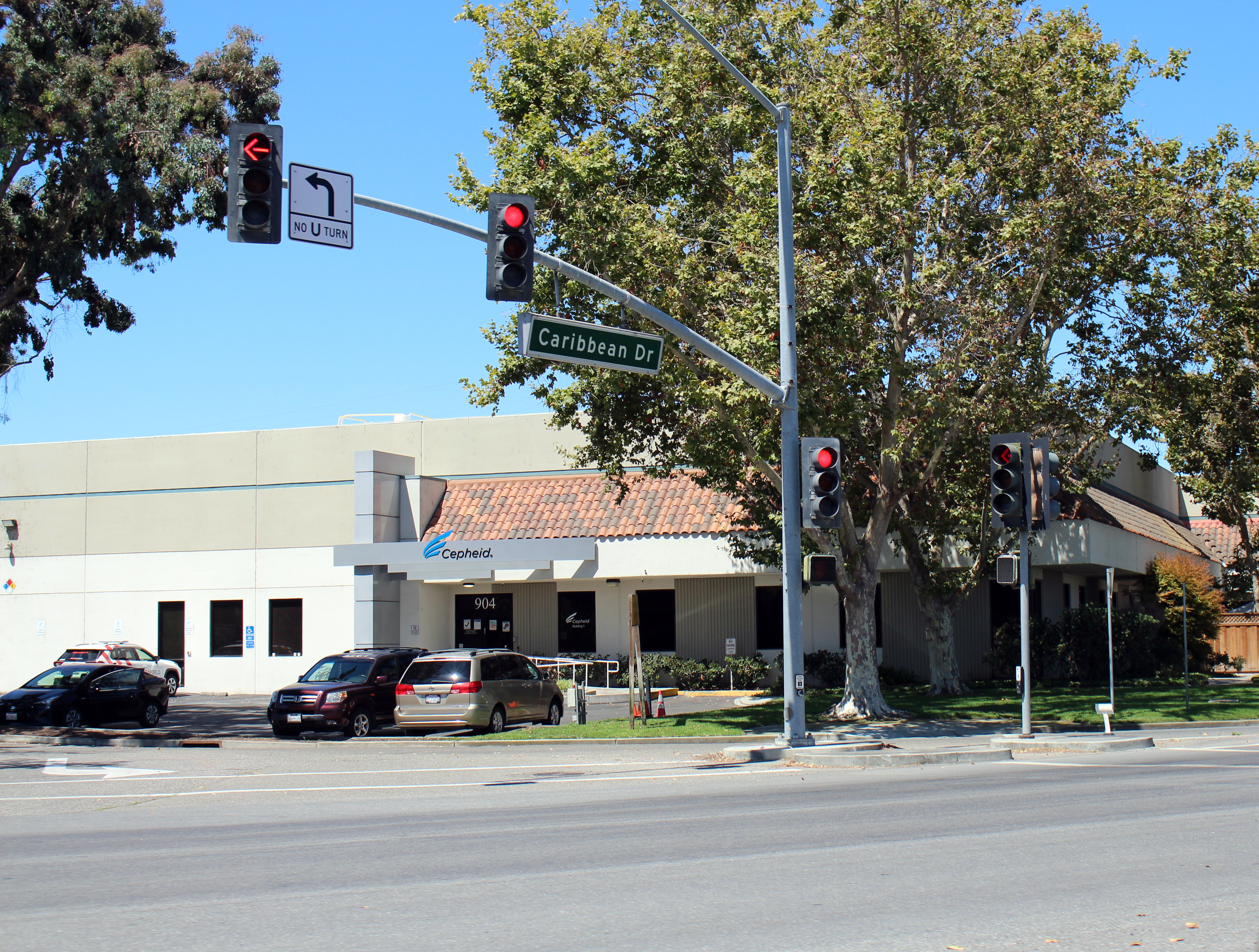
- Cepheid headquarters in Sunnyvale
- Type: Subsidiary
- Industry: Biotechnology; Medical devices
- Founded: March 1996; 30 years ago
- Headquarters: Sunnyvale, California, U.S.
- Key people: John L. Bishop; (Chairman & CEO); Warren Kocmond; (President & COO); Dr. David Persing; (Chief Medical Officer)
- Revenue: US$531.08 million (August 2016)
- Number of employees: 6,000+ (2024)
- Parent: Danaher Corporation
- Website: cepheid.com

Cepheid (Note: The legal name of the company is the single word Cepheid, with no indicator of corporate status in its name. This is legal in California.) is an American molecular diagnostics company and a subsidiary of Danaher Corporation. Its systems automate traditional nucleic acid tests (tests for specific sequences of DNA or RNA). The tests can be used to identify and analyze pathogens and genetic disorders. Cepheid sells clinical tests for healthcare-associated infections, infectious diseases, sexual health, oncology and genetics. The cartridges used in Cepheid's testing machines are single-use and must be bought from the manufacturer. Cepheid is headquartered in Sunnyvale, California.

== System ==
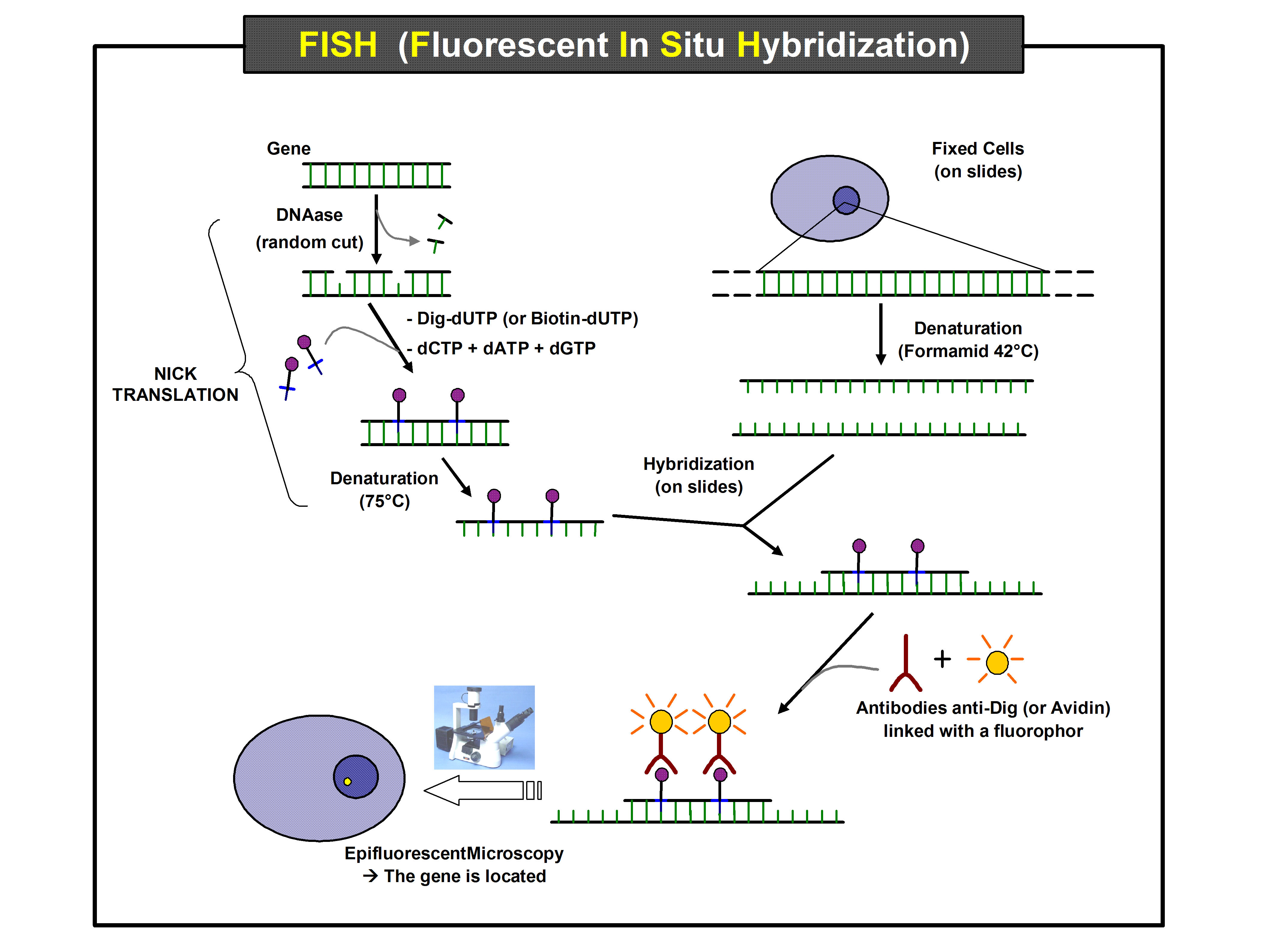
FISH testing, a standard techniqure for identifying pathogens, is done automatically by Cepheid's GeneXpert test systems

Cepheid's main product is the GeneXpert Infinity rapid molecular diagnostic system. The system was developed in the 1990s; the design remained substantially the same from the turn of the century to 2020. Similar tests have subsequently been developed by Abbott Laboratories and Hoffmann-La Roche.

The GeneXpert system identifies organisms from DNA. It extracts genetic material from a sample and, in the case of RNA viruses, it converts the RNA into DNA first. The GeneXpert test is an automated version of standard Real-time polymerase chain reaction amplification and detection.

Each sample to be tested is added to a single-use GeneXpert cartridge, sold by Cepheid; after this, the tests are self-contained and fully-automated. The cartridge contains an injection-moulded series of plastic chambers, which hold the chemicals and the sample. To run the test, multiple cartridges are loaded into a desktop machine (also made by Cepheid, but reusable). The sample and chemicals are moved into the test chambers using microfluidics: there is a rotary valve in the center, and some small plungers; the plungers push the sample into the valve, the valve rotates to a new position, and the sample is then pulled out into a new chamber. The machine provides the temperature cycling needed for the PCR (much like a programmable oven). This makes many copies of DNA matching the sample (amplification). Finally, the presences or absence of the pathogen is detected using FISH probes. These are short sections of DNA which have been made to attach to a fluorescent molecule. If the DNA from the sample matches the DNA of the FISH probes, the two bind, and the sample fluoresces. An optical system detects the glow, or its absence. A test for a new disease can be made by simply swapping in a FISH probe that matches the sequence of the new disease.

=== Tests ===
Tests for which a GeneXpert cartridge is sold as of 2021 (not exhaustive):

- influenza
- respiratory syncytial virus
- chlamydia and gonorrhea
- trichomonas vaginalis
- human papillomavirus
- group B streptococcus
- Clostridioides difficile
- enterovirus
- methicillin-resistant Staphylococcus aureus
- other drug-resistant bacteria
- chronic myeloid leukemia
- clotting disorders
- HIV
- hepatitis B
- hepatitis C
- SARS-CoV-2

== History ==
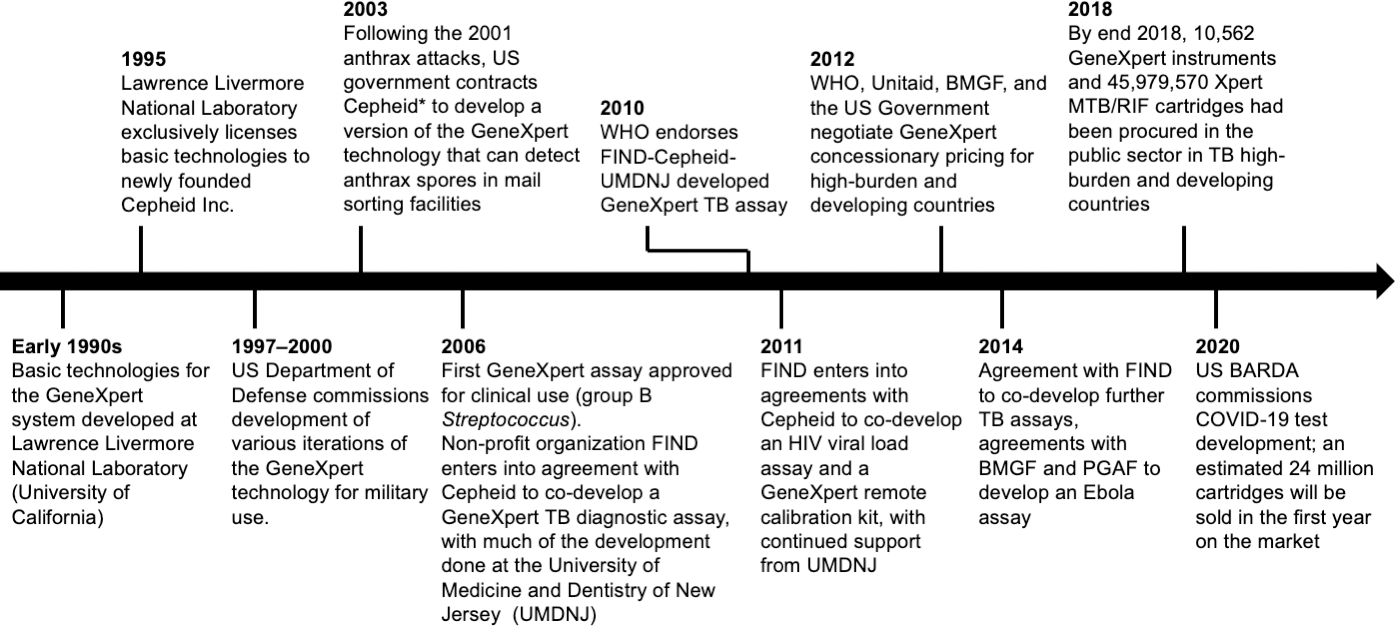

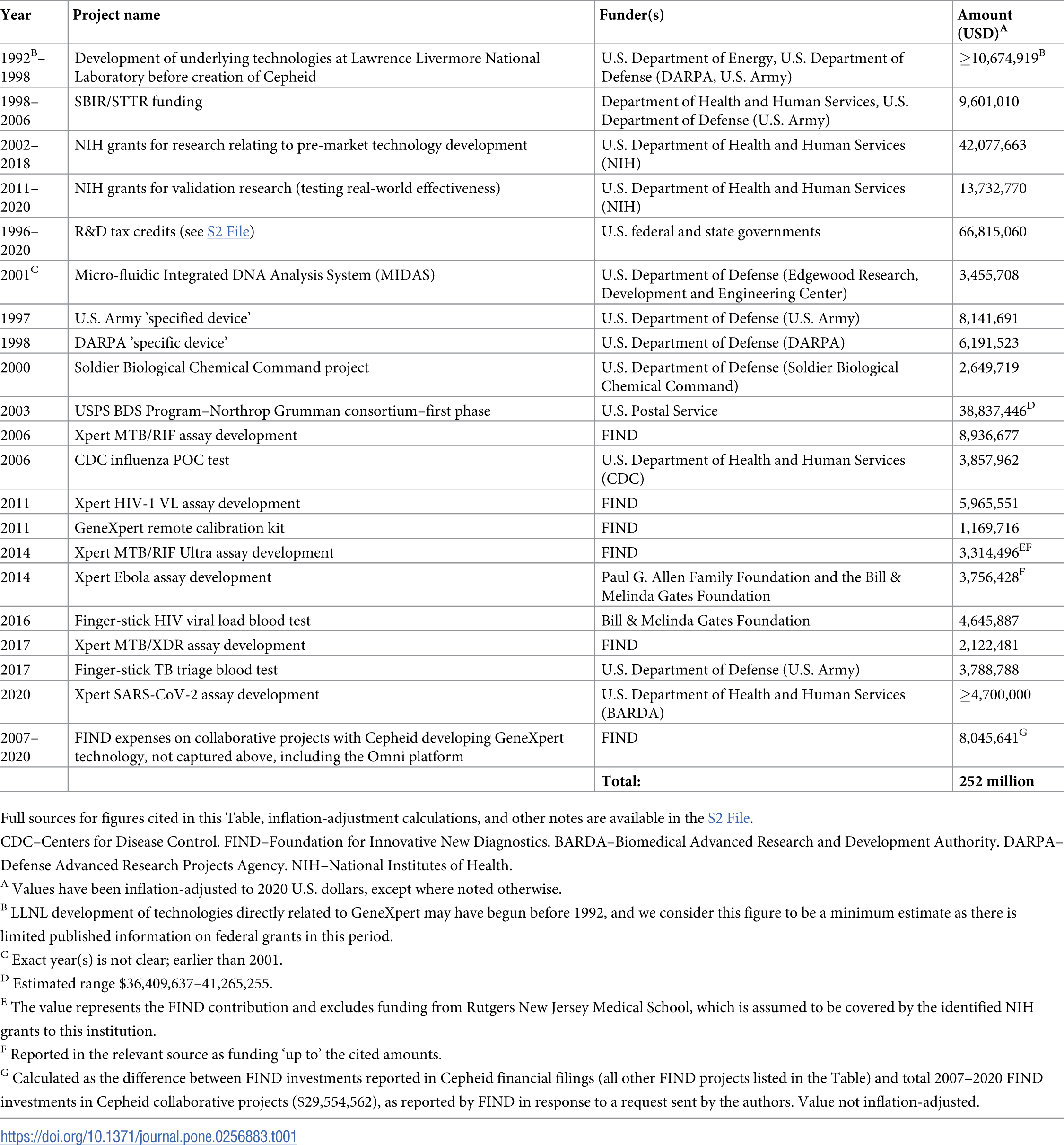
Tabular overview of public contributions to GeneXpert development.

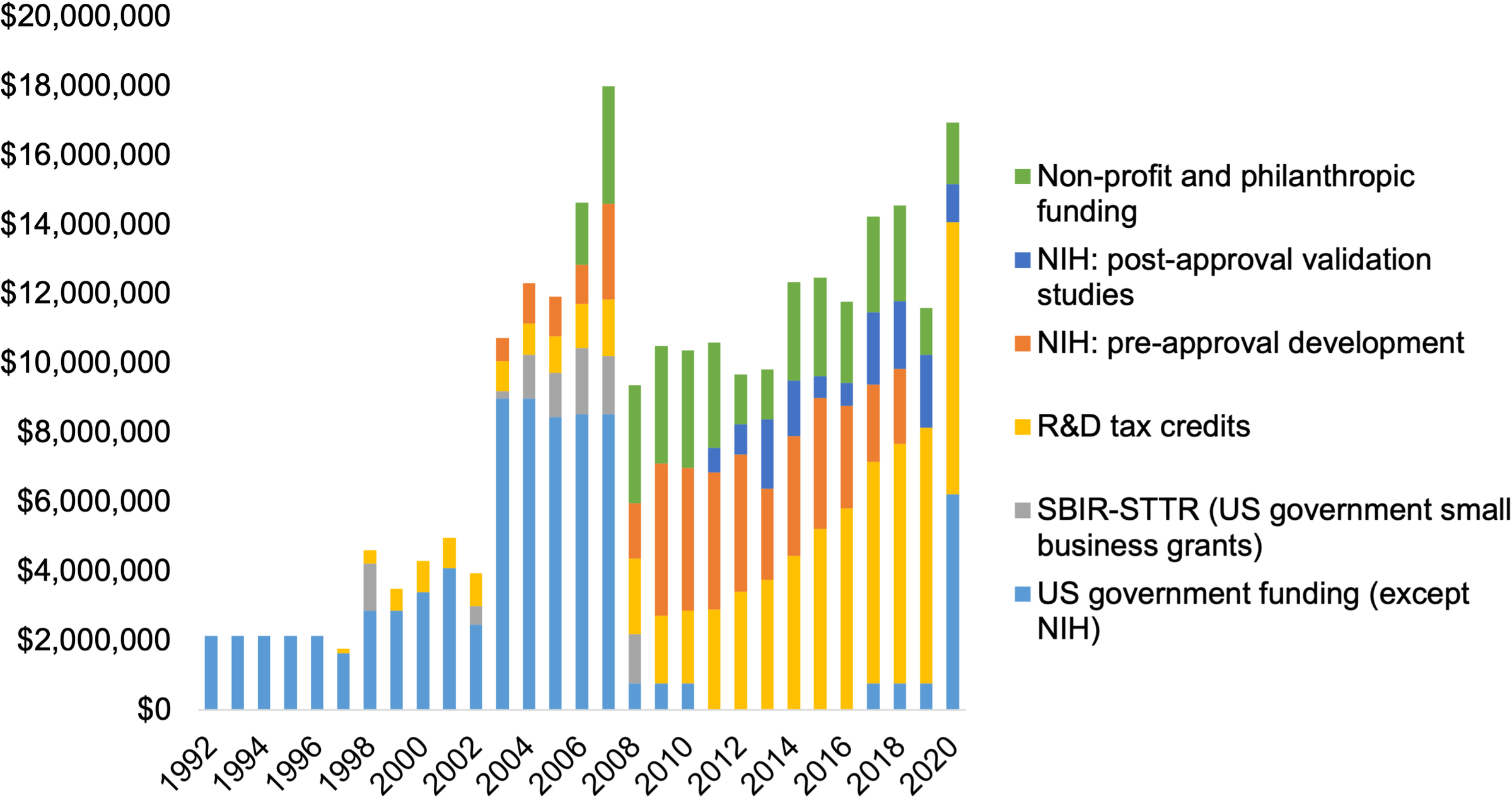
Public sector investments in GeneXpert development by source and year. Funding from non-NIH US government departments and non-profit/philanthropic organizations have been assumed to be equally distributed over a 5-year period to smooth out year-on-year changes.

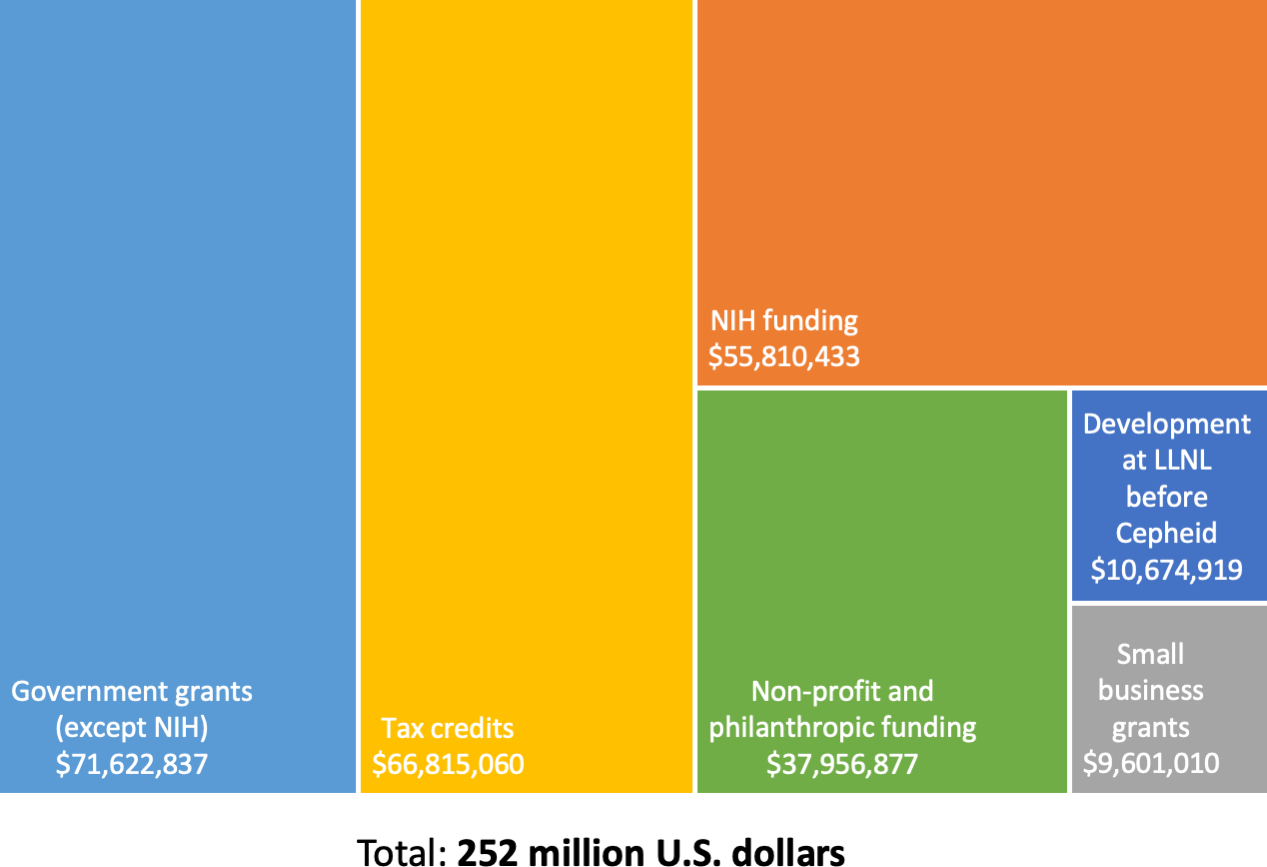
Tree-map of public investments

Cepheid was founded in March 1996 by Thomas Gutshall, Bill McMillan, Dr. Kurt Petersen, Dr. Greg Kovacs, Steven Young and Dr. Allen Northrup. The company's first CEO was Tom Gutshall, who held the position from 1996 to 2002.

The key engineering innovations underlying GeneXpert technologies, as well as early versions of the product and field testing, were done at the Lawrence Livermore National Laboratory at the University of California. It was funded by the microelectromechanical systems (MEMS) program of the DARPA and the U.S. Army, as well as through LLNL's internal budget.

In 2000, the company became a public company via an initial public offering.

By 2001, Cepheid received $15 million in funding from the United States Department of Defense, its primary source of funding at that time.

During the 2001 anthrax attacks, U.S. federal agencies contracted with Cepheid to track the anthrax. In 2003, the company put a temporary hold on some healthcare development to work with defense contractor, Northrop Grumman, on a U.S. federal government contract to install anthrax detection systems at US Post Office sites nationwide.

In April 2002, John L. Bishop was appointed CEO; he remained CEO until the company was sold in 2016.

Cepheid won the 2006 Industrial Design Excellence Awards for its product, Reagent Bead Dispenser.

The first clinical application for the GeneXpert System was introduced in 2006 with the U.S. FDA clearance of XpertGBS, a rapid molecular diagnostic test for Group B Streptococcus in pregnant women.

In August 2006, XpertGBS was categorized by the FDA as "Moderate Complexity" under the Clinical Laboratory Improvement Amendments (CLIA). It was the first amplified molecular diagnostic test using real-time PCR to receive this categorization. This allowed the test to be performed by the over 27,000 institutions registered for CLIA Moderate Complexity in addition to the approximately 7,000 institutions registered for High Complexity tests.

In February 2007, the company acquired Sangtec Molecular for $27 million.

In September 2007, Cepheid won a contract with the U.S. Department of Veterans Affairs for its MRSA reagent test kits.

In June 2014, the company partnered with AstraZeneca, GlaxoSmithKline, and Cubist Pharmaceuticals to develop a rapid diagnostic test that can target multidrug-resistant pathogens to help doctors appropriately prescribe antibiotics.

In November 2016, Danaher Corporation acquired the company for $4 billion.

During the COVID-19 pandemic, Cepheid partnered with Sherlock Biosciences in February 2020 to begin development of a CRISPR-based diagnostic test for the SARS-CoV-2 virus, to run on the same machines as Cepheid's 20-year-old GeneXpert tests, as there were machines already installed in hospitals.

In March 2020, the company announced a rapid diagnostic test for SARS-CoV-2; the U.S. FDA granted an emergency use authorization for the test. The diagnostic is designed to run on any of the (over 23,000) existing Cepheid GeneXpert machines worldwide, with the standard 45 minute detection time.

In October 2024, the World Health Organization granted emergency use authorization to Cepheid for its mpox in-vitro diagnostic test.

== See also ==
- GeneXpert MTB/RIF – Tuberculosis disgnostic and antibiotic sensitivity test
- Nucleic acid test – Group of techniques to detect a particular nucleic acid sequence
- Robert Guthrie (microbiologist) – American microbiologist (1916–1995)
