= Cordts =

Cordts is a surname. Notable people with the surname include:

- John Cordts (born 1935), American racing driver
- John N. Cordts (1867–1913), American politician

== See also ==
- Cordts Mansion, historic house in New York, U.S.
- Cordt, given name
