= Cordt =

Cordt is a given name. Notable people with the given name include:

- Cordt Schnibben (born 1952), German journalist
- Cordt Weinstein (born 1972), American soccer player

== See also ==
- Cordts, a surname
