= Kurt Sanmark =

Finland-Swedish author and insurance officer (1927–1990)

Kurt Olof Sanmark (22 July 1927 – 14 May 1990) was a Finland-Swedish author and insurance officer Finnish.

He was the son of railway engineer Olof Johan Henrik Sanmark and Anna Ellen Volkmer. Sanmark was married to Meeri Sihvola from 1952. Sanmark graduated from Borgå lyceum in 1945 and then studied chemistry and mathematics at Åbo Akademi University, where he completed the first part of his Master of Science degree in 1948. He worked as a statistical investigator at the insurance company Fennia from 1951 to 1955.

From 1955 he was employed by Ömsesidiga Försäkringsbolaget Svensk-Finland, where he was head of reinsurance from 1962 and deputy director from 1982 to 1987. He made his debut with the late modernist poetry collection Människas ansikte (1952), which was followed by, among others, Vind av stoft (1955) and Blott du (1960). His collection OSV (1964) showed familiarity with international lyrical modernism, where fragmented poems, "lettrism", alternated with collage and other verbal experiments. In his autobiographical prose, Sanmark had a meditative, searching approach. Existential issues were analyzed in Anteckningar, drömmar (1970) and the self-disclosing Dagbok (1976). Sanmark also wrote literary criticism in Borgåbladet 1956–1957 and Hufvudstadsbladet 1957–1968. He was a board member of Society of Swedish Authors in Finland (Finlands svenska författareförening) 1960–1964 and 1967–1975.

== Bibliography ==
- 1952 – Människans ansikte, diktsamling. Tampere, S&Co
- 1953 – Väven, novel. Loviisa, S&Co
- 1955 – Vind av stoft, poetry collection. Loviisa, S&Co
- 1958 – Insyn, novel. Porvoo, S&Co
- 1960 – Blott du, poetry collection. Porvoo, S&Co
- 1963 – Förskjutningar, short story collection. Porvoo, S&Co
- 1964 – OSV, poetry collection. Porvoo, S&Co
- 1965 – Muren, radio play
- 1970 – Anteckningar, drömmar, essays. Helsinki, S&Co
- 1973 – Obundna texter, poetry collection. Porvoo, S&Co
- 1976 – Dagbok. Porvoo, S&Co
