= Kurt Petersen (inventor) =

American businessman (born 1948)

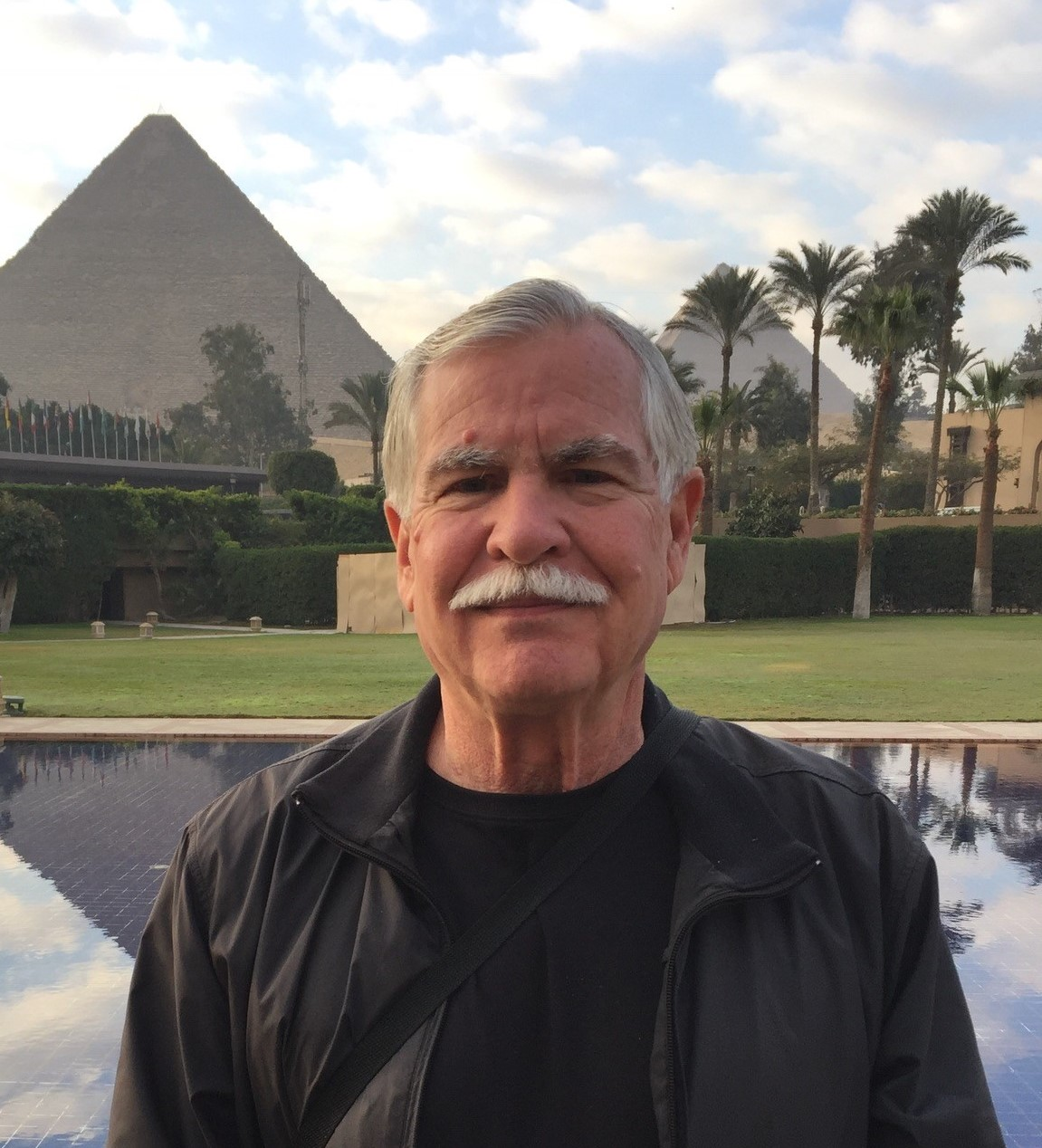
- Born: February 13, 1948 (age 78)
- Education: University of California, Berkeley
- Occupation: inventor

Kurt E. Petersen (born February 13, 1948) is an American inventor and entrepreneur. He is known primarily for his work on microelectromechanical systems. Petersen was elected a member of the United States National Academy of Engineering in 2001.

== Biography ==
Petersen received his BS degree cum laude in Electrical Engineering from The University of California at Berkeley in 1970. In 1975, he received a PhD degree in EE from the Massachusetts Institute of Technology. He established a micromachining research group at IBM from 1975 to 1982, during which he wrote the review paper “Silicon as a Mechanical Material,” published in the IEEE Proceedings (May 1982). This paper is a highly referenced work in the field of micromachining and micro-electro-mechanical systems (MEMS); it is considered to have helped establish MEMS as its own branch of technology. As of September 2017, Google Scholar reported 3,795 citations.

== Career ==
Since 1982, Dr. Petersen has co-founded six successful companies in MEMS technology, including Transensory Devices Inc. in 1982 and NovaSensor, a company which develops low-cost micromachined blood pressure sensors using bulk silicon micromachining technology, in 1985. In 1996, he co-founded Cepheid, a company which uses microfluidic technology for rapid PCR detection. Dr. Petersen also co-founded SiTime in 2004 and Profusa in 2008. In 2009, he co-founded Verreon and joined as Chief Technology Officer, helping to coordinate the company’s sale to Qualcomm in 2010.

In 2011, Petersen joined the Band of Angels in Silicon Valley, an angel investment group which mentors and invests in early stage, high-tech, start-up companies. He served as co-chair for the Band of Angel’s hardware subgroup. He joined the Board of Directors for Innovative Micro Technology (IMT) in 2013.

Dr. Petersen has published over 100 papers and has been granted over 35 patents over the course of his career. He is a member of the National Academy of Engineering and is a Fellow of the IEEE.

== Honours ==
In 2001, he was elected a member of the United States National Academy of Engineering for "contributions to the research and commercialization of microelectromechanical systems (MEMS)," and he received the Fellowship of the IEEE in recognition of his contributions “for pioneering contributions and successful commercialization of micromechanical systems”. That same year, he was awarded the IEEE Simon Ramo Medal.

In 2002, Red Herring ranked him as a Top Ten Innovator. In 2019, Petersen received the IEEE Medal of Honor.
