= Kurt Pompe =

Kurt Bruno Pompe (March 4, 1899 in Schmiedeberg, Lower Silesia, German Empire – August 1, 1964 in Schweinfurt, West Germany) was a German military officer who occupied important positions, including commandant, in several forced labor camps for Jews in Silesia (German until 1945) during World War II, part of a network of over 160 camps run by an SS organization, Dienststelle Schmelt. The existence of this group of camps is largely unknown to the general public.

== Military career ==
=== Pre World War II ===
Pompe was severely wounded at Tournai (Belgium) close to the end of World War I on October 25, 1918. His left leg was amputated below the knee and fitted with a prothesis. In 1922 he and his family moved to the city of Neisse in Upper Silesia.

=== World War II ===
In 1942, Pompe, who was often nicknamed "the limper," was feared by the inmates of Blechhammer (Upper Silesia), but nowhere else did he commit as many atrocities as at Brande (Upper Silesia), where he was the commander of the guards ("Wachhabender") from fall 1942 to August 1943. The German-Jewish camp physician Hans-Werner Wollenberg has written a harrowing account of Pompe's activities at this camp. Numerous interviews with survivors contain memories of the terrible conditions at Brande, for which Pompe bore a major responsibility. After the closure of Brande he commanded the guards in the women's section of the Blechhammer camp, and from November 1943 to April 1944, he was camp commander ("Lagerführer') at the Schmiedeberg forced labor camp, which was located near his city of birth in the village of Buschvorwerk. In both camps he terrorized the inmates and committed several murders.

=== Post war life ===
In his de-Nazification application of April 23, 1946, he indicated that he was a member of Organisation Todt and, from fall 1943, a member of Transportkorps Speer, with the rank of Obertruppführer. He classified himself as innocent ("unbelastet") and continued to live under his real name. In 1951 Pompe moved from Höchberg near Würzburg to Schweinfurt where he was employed by Vereinigte Kugellager Fabriken AG as a laborer. In the 1970s, a West German court became aware of some of Pompe's war-time deeds in the context of investigating members of Dienststelle Schmelt, but he was not identified until 2008.

== Bibliography ==
- Hans-Werner Wollenberg, ... und der Alptraum wurde zum Alltag. Autobiographischer Brief eines jüdischen Arztes über NS-Zwangsarbeiterlager in Schlesien (1942–1945) Pfaffenweiler, 1992. ISBN 3-89085-460-5, pp. 75–115.
- Hermann F. Weiss, Buschvorwerk im Riesengebirge. Eine Gemeinde in Niederschlesien von den Kriegsjahren bis zur Vertreibung. Herbolzheim, 2006. ISBN 3-8255-0663-0, pp. 157–200.
- Hermann F. Weiss: From Reichsautobahnlager to Schmelt Camp: Brande, a Forgotten Holocaust Site in Western Upper Silesia 1940–1943. In: Yad Vashem Studies., 39.2 (2011) ISSN 0084-3296, pp. 98–114
