= Nucleic acid test =

Group of techniques to detect a particular nucleic acid sequence

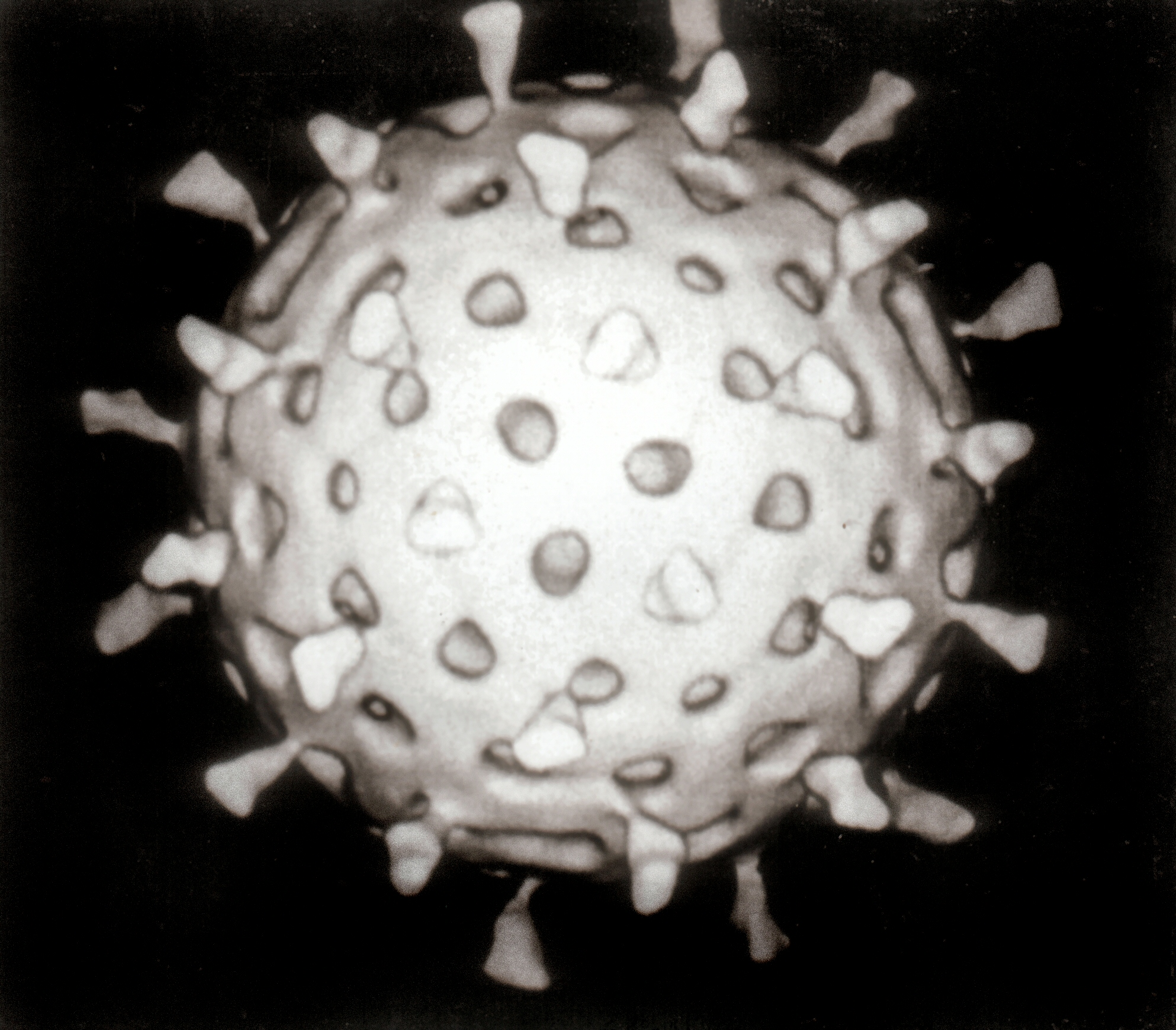
Rotavirus

A nucleic acid test (NAT) is a technique used to directly detect a specific nucleic acid sequence, usually to detect and identify a particular species or subspecies of organism, often a virus or bacterium that acts as a pathogen in blood, tissue, urine, etc. NATs differ from other tests in that they detect genetic materials (RNA or DNA) rather than antigens or antibodies. Detection of genetic materials allows an early diagnosis of a disease because the detection of antigens and/or antibodies requires time for them to start appearing in the bloodstream. Since the amount of a certain genetic material is usually very small, many NATs include a step that amplifies the genetic material—that is, makes many copies of it. Such NATs are called nucleic acid amplification tests (NAATs). There are several ways of amplification, including polymerase chain reaction (PCR), strand displacement assay (SDA), transcription mediated assay (TMA), and loop-mediated isothermal amplification (LAMP).

Virtually all nucleic acid amplification methods and detection technologies use the specificity of Watson-Crick base pairing; single-stranded probe or primer molecules capture DNA or RNA target molecules of complementary strands. Therefore, the design of probe strands is highly significant to raise the sensitivity and specificity of the detection. However, the mutants which form the genetic basis for a variety of human diseases are usually slightly different from the normal nucleic acids. Often, they are only different in a single base, e.g., insertions, deletions, and single-nucleotide polymorphisms (SNPs). In this case, imperfect probe-target binding can easily occur, resulting in false-positive outcomes such as mistaking a strain that is commensal for one that is pathogenic. Much research has been dedicated to achieving single-base specificity.

== Advances ==
Nucleic acid (DNA and RNA) strands with corresponding sequences stick together in pairwise chains. But each node of the chain is not very sticky, so the double-stranded chain is continuously coming partway unzipped and re-zipping itself under the influence of ambient vibrations (referred to as thermal noise or Brownian motion). Longer pairings are more stable. Nucleic acid tests use a "probe" which is a long strand with a short strand stuck to it. The long primer strand has a corresponding (complementary) sequence to a "target" strand from the disease organism being detected. The disease strand sticks tightly to the exposed part of the long primer strand (called the "toehold"), and then little by little, displaces the short "protector" strand from the probe. In the end, the short protector strand is not bound to anything, and the unbound short primer is detectable. The rest of this section gives some history of the research needed to fine-tune this process into a useful test.

In 2012, Yin's research group published a paper about optimizing the specificity of nucleic acid hybridization. They introduced a ‘toehold exchange probe (PC)’ which consists of a pre-hybridized complement strand C and a protector strand P. Complement strand is longer than protector strand to have unbound tail in the end, a toehold. Complement is perfectly complementary with the target sequence. When the correct target(X) reacts with the toehold exchange probe(PC), P is released and hybridized product XC is formed. The standard free energy(∆) of the reaction is close to zero. On the other hand, if the toehold exchange probe(PC) reacts with spurious target(S), the reaction forwards, but the standard free energy increases to be less thermodynamically favorable. The standard free energy difference(∆∆) is significant enough to give obvious discrimination in yield. The discrimination factor Q is calculated as, the yield of correct target hybridization divided by the yield of spurious target hybridization. Through the experiments on different toehold exchange probes with 5 correct targets and 55 spurious targets with energetically representative single-base changes (replacements, deletions, and insertions), Yin's group concluded that discrimination factors of these probes were between 3 and 100 + with the median 26. The probes function robustly from 10 °C to 37 °C, from 1 mM to 47 mM, and with nucleic acid concentrations from 1 nM to 5 M. They also figured out the toehold exchange probes work robustly even in RNA detection.

Further researches have been studied thereafter. In 2013, Seelig's group published a paper about fluorescent molecular probes which also utilizes the toehold exchange reaction. This enabled the optical detection of correct target and SNP target. They also succeeded in the detection of SNPs in E. coli-derived samples.

In 2015, David's group achieved extremely high (1,000+) selectivity of single-nucleotide variants (SNVs) by introducing the system called ‘competitive compositions’. In this system, they constructed a kinetic reaction model of the underlying hybridization processes to predict the optimal parameter values, which vary based on the sequences of SNV and wildtype (WT), on the design architecture of the probe and sink, and on the reagent concentrations and assay conditions. Their model succeeded in a median 890-fold selectivity for 44 cancer-related DNA SNVs, with a minimum of 200, which represents at least a 30-fold improvement over previous hybridization-based assays. In addition, they applied this technology to assay low VAF sequences from human genomic DNA following PCR, as well as directly to synthetic RNA sequences.

Based on the expertise, they developed a new PCR method called Blocker Displacement Amplification (BDA). It is a temperature-robust PCR which selectively amplifies all sequence variants within a roughly 20 nt window by 1000-fold over wildtype sequences, allowing easy detection and quantitation of hundreds of potentials variants originally at ≤ 0.1% allele frequency. BDA achieves similar enrichment performance across anneal temperatures ranging from 56 °C to 64 °C. This temperature robustness facilitates multiplexed enrichment of many different variants across the genome, and furthermore enables the use of inexpensive and portable thermocycling instruments for rare DNA variant detection. BDA has been validated even on sample types including clinical cell-free DNA samples collected from the blood plasma of lung cancer patients.

== Applications ==
- Diagnosis of gonococcal and other neisserian infections: amplification of specific N. gonorrhoeae DNA or RNA sequences for detection.
- Diagnosis of urogenital C. trachomatis infections
- Detection of Mycobacterium tuberculosis
- Detection of HIV RNA or DNA
- Detection of zoonotic coronaviruses
- Diagnostic test for SARS-CoV-2
- Detection of antibiotic resistant bacteria following antibiotic treatment
