= Nightingale Hospital =

Nightingale Hospital can mean:

- Nightingale Hospital (Marylebone), a private mental health facility in Marylebone, London
- NHS Nightingale Hospitals, temporary critical care hospitals established in the United Kingdom during the 2020 coronavirus pandemic
  - NHS Nightingale Hospital London, within East London's ExCeL centre
  - NHS Nightingale Hospital Birmingham, within the city's National Exhibition Centre
  - NHS Nightingale Hospital North West, within Manchester Central
  - NHS Nightingale Hospital North East, in Sunderland
  - NHS Nightingale Hospital Yorkshire and the Humber, within Harrogate Convention Centre
  - NHS Louisa Jordan Hospital in Glasgow, Scotland
- Florence Nightingale Field Hospital, Gibraltar

== See also ==
- NHS COVID-19 critical care hospitals, sometimes referred to as "Nightingale Hospitals" (of which a subset are)
- St Thomas' Hospital, London, UK; the hospital at which Florence Nightingale taught
  - Florence Nightingale Faculty of Nursing and Midwifery, the hospital teaching faculty that Florence Nightingale established
- Nightingale ward, a type of hospital ward
- Nightingale (disambiguation)
- Hospital (disambiguation)
