= Operation Rescript =

British military operation to tackle the COVID-19 pandemic

- Part of COVID-19 pandemic in the United Kingdom
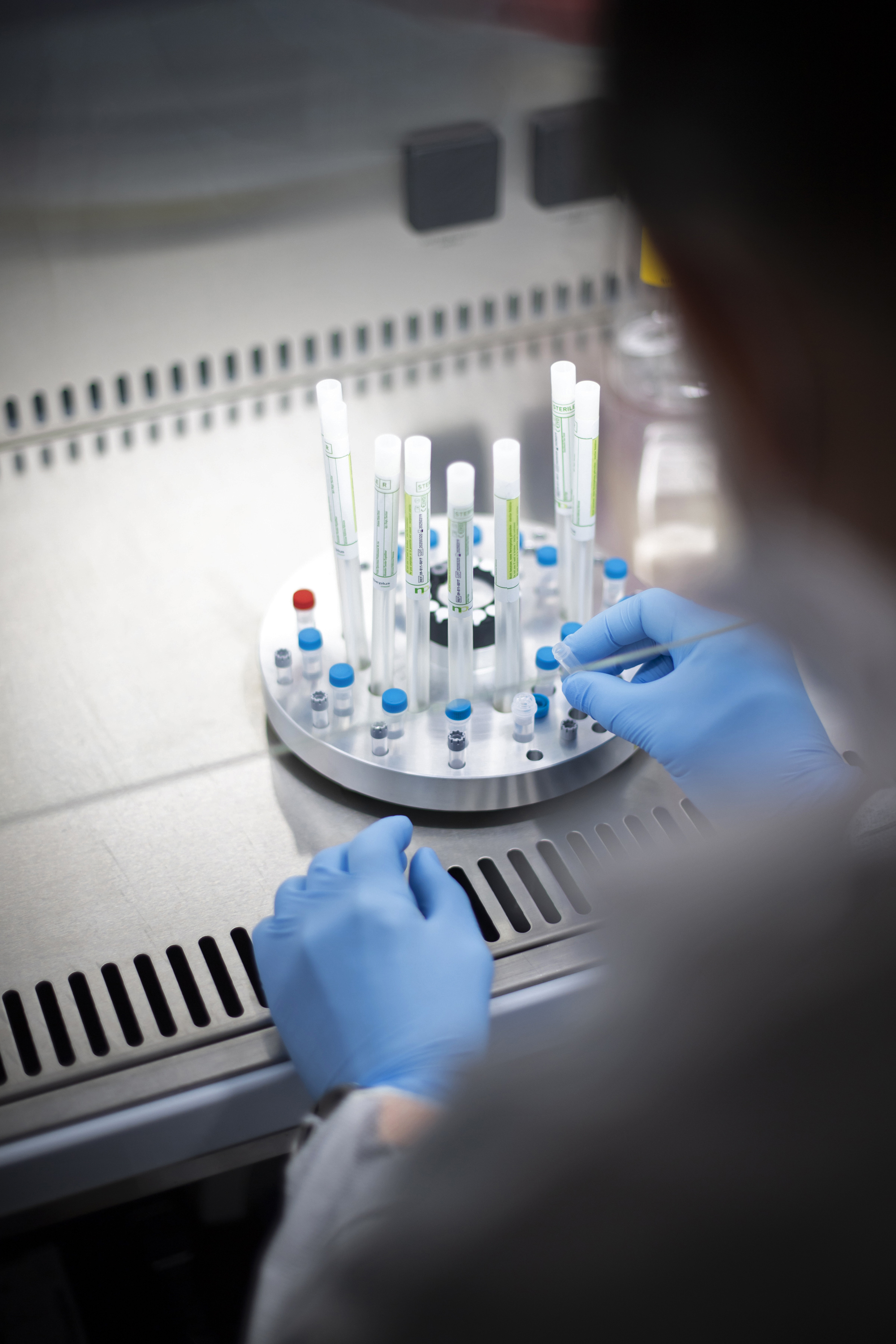
- An engineer from the British Army's Royal Electrical and Mechanical Engineers applying finishing touches to a Mobile Test Unit (MTU).
- Location: United Kingdom & Crown Dependencies
- Objective: Maintain public order, assist public services and civilian authorities in tackling the Coronavirus outbreak.
- Date: 23 March 2020 – 2022
- Executed by: United Kingdom

Operation Rescript was the code name for the British military operation to help tackle the COVID-19 pandemic in the United Kingdom and its Crown Dependencies between 2020 and 2022. It was described as the UK's "biggest ever homeland military operation in peacetime" by the Ministry of Defence (MOD), involving up to 23,000 personnel within a specialist task force, named the COVID Support Force (CSF). The support was given at the request of the UK government, its devolved administrations and civil authorities (including the National Health Service (NHS)) through the Military aid to the civil authorities (MACA) mechanism.

Launched in March 2020, at the start of the pandemic's first wave, the operation began with the airlifting of critical COVID-19 patients, logistical support, planning support and the formation of a helicopter task force. From April 2020, the CSF began helping plan, construct and staff several temporary critical care hospitals across the UK and also provided drivers and call handlers to reinforce ambulance services. In May 2020, the CSF helped with mass COVID-19 testing across the country to help reach a government target for 100,000 tests per day. These tests were largely carried out at mobile testing units which had been set up by the CSF in areas such as police stations, fire stations, care homes, prisons and benefit centres.

During the pandemic's second wave, from September 2020, the CSF assisted with more mass testing and, from December 2020, began assisting with the UK's vaccination rollout through providing planning support, medical staff and constructing vaccination centres — a task which was described as "unparalleled in its scale and complexity" by Brigadier Phil Prosser, Commander of Military Support to the Vaccine Delivery Programme.

Other support provided by the armed forces included the testing of the NHS' contact tracing phone application, NHS Test and Trace, the manufacturing of personal protective equipment (PPE), the creation of disinfectants, including the Virusend formula, and countering COVID-19 misinformation. It was one of two British military operations to assist with tackling the pandemic; the other being Operation Broadshare which focuses on activities overseas, including within the British Overseas Territories (BOTs).

In November 2022, Defence Minister James Heappey stated that the operation had concluded, although the exact date of its conclusion was not specified.

== Background ==
In December 2019, a cluster of "pneumonia" cases were reported in Wuhan, China. These cases were later found to be caused by a newly identified SARS-CoV-2 virus. On 20 January 2020, the first cases of the virus outside China were confirmed in Japan, South Korea and Thailand. By 29 January, cases had continued to spread and the first two cases were confirmed in the United Kingdom. On 28 February, the virus was confirmed to have spread within the UK population and, by 4 March, there had been an upsurge in cases within the country. The pandemic grew to be considered the most serious peacetime emergency the UK has faced in a century.

On 16 March 2020, the British government mobilised 10,000 military personnel to help tackle the escalating outbreak. This military support was made available through the Military aid to the civil authorities (MACA) mechanism which allows government departments, the devolved administrations and civil authorities to request military support in times of emergency. Media outlets began speculating the extent of the military's involvement, with one report from Sky News claiming troops may be used to "help cope with the breakdown of civil society", whilst another, from The Times, claimed prisons may need to be staffed by military personnel if prison staff became ill. These reports caused some public alarm which prompted Defence Secretary Ben Wallace to publicly dismiss the stories as "fictional" and urge caution. On 19 March 2020, a further 10,000 military personnel were put on standby to form a specialist task force to help tackle the virus, named the COVID Support Force (CSF). The names of two military operations were announced as being Operation Rescript and Operation Broadshare; Rescript being focused within the United Kingdom, whilst Broadshare focused on activities overseas. When planning the operation, experience was drawn from previous homeland military operations, including Operation Olympics, which provided security for the 2012 Summer Olympics in London, Operation Redfold, which was a contingency to limit any disruption caused by a No-deal Brexit in 2020, and Operation Morlop, the response to the poisoning of Sergei and Yulia Skripal in 2018.

=== COVID Support Force ===
On 19 March 2020, the Ministry of Defence announced the formation of the COVID Support Force as part of its measures to help tackle the Coronavirus outbreak. The support force comprised 20,000 military personnel tasked with supporting public services, which included 150 military personnel being trained to drive oxygen tankers to support the National Health Service (NHS). Scientists from Defence Science and Technology Laboratory also began supporting Public Health England. The COVID Support Force reported to the Standing Joint Commander (UK) Major General Tyrone Urch at Aldershot. It included 10 regional commands.

On 20 March 2020, The Telegraph reported General Sir Nick Carter had ordered the armed forces to prepare for a "six month operation". Overseas exercises, including those in Canada and Kenya, were cancelled to free up personnel for the COVID Support Force. The armed forces had previously been involved in repatriation flights of British and EU citizens in affected areas, such as China, Japan and Cuba.

In April 2020, an additional 3,000 reservist personnel joined the COVID Support Force bringing it to 23,000 personnel in total.

According to the Ministry of Defence, over half of the 6,500-strong Defence Medical Services have been involved with Operation Rescript, representing the largest contribution from any part of Defence.

== Tasks ==
=== Medical evacuations ===
The British military first supported the COVID-19 response on 31 January 2020, when RAF Brize Norton and defence medics assisted with the first COVID-19 repatriation flight from Wuhan. MoD Boscombe Down was subsequently designated the preferred airfield for future COVID-19 repatriation flights.

On 15 March 2020, the Royal Air Force responded to its first MACA request to airlift a critically ill COVID-19 patient from the Isles of Scilly to Newquay Airport using a Boeing Chinook helicopter. Further medical evacuations took place in other remote areas, including in Shetland and Northern Ireland utilising a range of military aircraft equipped for the task, including Airbus A400M Atlas, Airbus Voyager and Westland Puma. Other types, such as British Aerospace 146, were converted to bolster the RAF's capacity.

=== Temporary hospitals ===
Locations of NHS Nightingale Hospitals which were built with military assistance in England.

In order to alleviate pressure on local hospitals dealing with the pandemic, a number of temporary critical care hospitals were established across the country. These were built and staffed with the assistance of the COVID Support Force (CSF). In England, these temporary hospitals were named the NHS Nightingale Hospitals. The first, NHS Nightingale Hospital London, was built at the ExCeL London convention centre on 3 April 2020. It was constructed in just nine days with the assistance of 1st Battalion, The Royal Anglian Regiment, 256 Field Hospital and the Royal Engineers, and was staffed partly by military medics working alongside the NHS.

Other NHS Nightingale hospitals were built and staffed with the assistance of the CSF in Birmingham, Bristol, Exeter, Harrogate, Manchester and Washington, involving units from the Royal Engineers, the Brigade of Gurkhas, 4th Regiment Royal Artillery and the Royal Centre for Defence Medicine, among others.

In Scotland, the CSF assisted with the planning and construction of a temporary hospital, named NHS Louisa Jordan Hospital, at the SEC Centre in Glasgow. In Wales, it helped plan and build the UK's second-largest temporary hospital, named the Dragon's Heart Hospital, within Cardiff's Principality Stadium. The British Army's 1st Battalion, The Rifles was involved with its construction and the hospital was staffed with the help of military medics. In April 2020, the CSF helped advise on a potential temporary hospital at HM Prison Maze, a disused prison in County Down, Northern Ireland.

In addition to larger-scale temporary hospitals, the CSF also helped repurpose other sites to facilitate additional patient beds, intensive care units and morgues. Headley Court, a former defence medical rehabilitation centre, which closed in 2018, was one such location. Another location, St. Mary's Hospital in the Isle of Wight, was expanded with the help of the Scots Guards. Morgues have also been established, including within disused RAF hangars, with the bodies transported via rental vans driven by military personnel.

=== Aviation Task Force ===
On 23 March 2020, Joint Helicopter Command (JHC) formed a specialist task force, named the COVID Support Force Aviation Task Force (CTF ATF), to assist with the pandemic response. The ATF comprised helicopters from across the three armed services which were forward-deployed to transport patients, personnel, equipment and cargo. Additionally, Joint Helicopter Support Squadron and Tactical Supply Wing provided support through the provision of suitable helicopter landing sites and remote aircraft refueling capabilities. The headquarters for the ATF was based at RAF Benson in Oxfordshire, England. The first reported ATF medical evacuation took place on 22 April 2020 and involved a Puma helicopter transporting a critically ill COVID-19 patient from the Isle of Arran to a hospital in Kilmarnock. A total of 12 helicopters were attached to the ATF during May 2020.

ATF Overview
Area of responsibility	Aircraft and locations
Scotland and Northern England	3 x Westland Puma forward-deployed to Kinloss Barracks between 27 March 2020 – 12 June 2020.; 2 x AgustaWestland AW159 Wildcat forward-deployed to RAF Leeming on 27 March 2020.; 1 x Boeing Chinook forward-deployed to RAF Leeming on 27 March 2020.
Midlands and Southern England	2 x AgustaWestland AW159 Wildcat forward-deployed to RNAS Yeovilton on 27 March 2020.; 3 x Boeing Chinook forward-deployed to RAF Odiham on 27 March 2020.; 3 x AgustaWestland AW101 at RNAS Culdrose on 1 April 2020.

=== Personal protective equipment ===
The global demand for personal protective equipment (PPE) reached unprecedented levels during the pandemic and, initially, the UK experienced a shortage of supply. The CSF and wider armed forces assisted with the provision of PPE through sourcing, delivering and manufacturing. The Royal Logistic Corps was heavily involved, working from an NHS supply hub in Northamptonshire, England. Defence Equipment & Support (DE&S) helped with sourcing and quality assurance testing, including for the Cabinet Office and the Department for Health and Social Care, whilst specialist CBRN instructors from the British Army helped with fit testing, including within four Scottish hospitals.

The first reported batch of PPE was delivered by 101 Logistic Brigade to St Thomas' Hospital in London on 23 March 2020. In April 2020, 3rd Battalion, Royal Welsh helped deliver two large batches of PPE flown in from Cambodia and China. During the same month, the RAF also deployed Atlas transport aircraft to deliver delayed PPE from Turkey. In addition to hospitals, PPE was also delivered to police forces, including by units such as 4 Regiment RLC.

To help manufacture PPE, some military units utilised 3D printing. These units included the British Army's 22 Engineer Regiment, the RAF's Chinook Support Centre (CSC) and the Royal Navy's Engineer Naval Reservists at HMNB Devonport and HMNB Portsmouth. By 6 May 2020, 2,000 items of PPE had been produced by personnel at RNAS Culdrose.

=== Ambulance support ===
The pandemic placed increased pressure on ambulance services across the country with some being placed at a "status four" of organisational readiness. From April 2020, the COVID Support Force began providing support through the provision of ambulance drivers and call handlers. The South Central Ambulance Service was the first ambulance service to receive this support on 1 April 2020, with 80 military personnel involved. This was followed by the Welsh Ambulance Service and the East of England Ambulance Service in the same month.

In late April, personnel from RAF Henlow, RAF Honington and RAF Marham began supporting the East of England Ambulance Service. Later, in May 2020, 20 personnel from RAF Odiham began supporting the South Central Ambulance Service as co-responders.

In December 2020, during the second wave of the pandemic, 90 personnel from the Royal Logistic Corps and the Royal Army Medical Corps were redeployed to assist the Welsh Ambulance Service.

In September 2021, the Scottish Government requested assistance from the armed forces due to mounting pressures caused by COVID-19 to the Scottish Ambulance Service.

=== Testing ===
A mobile testing unit staffed by the British Army in Ealing, England.

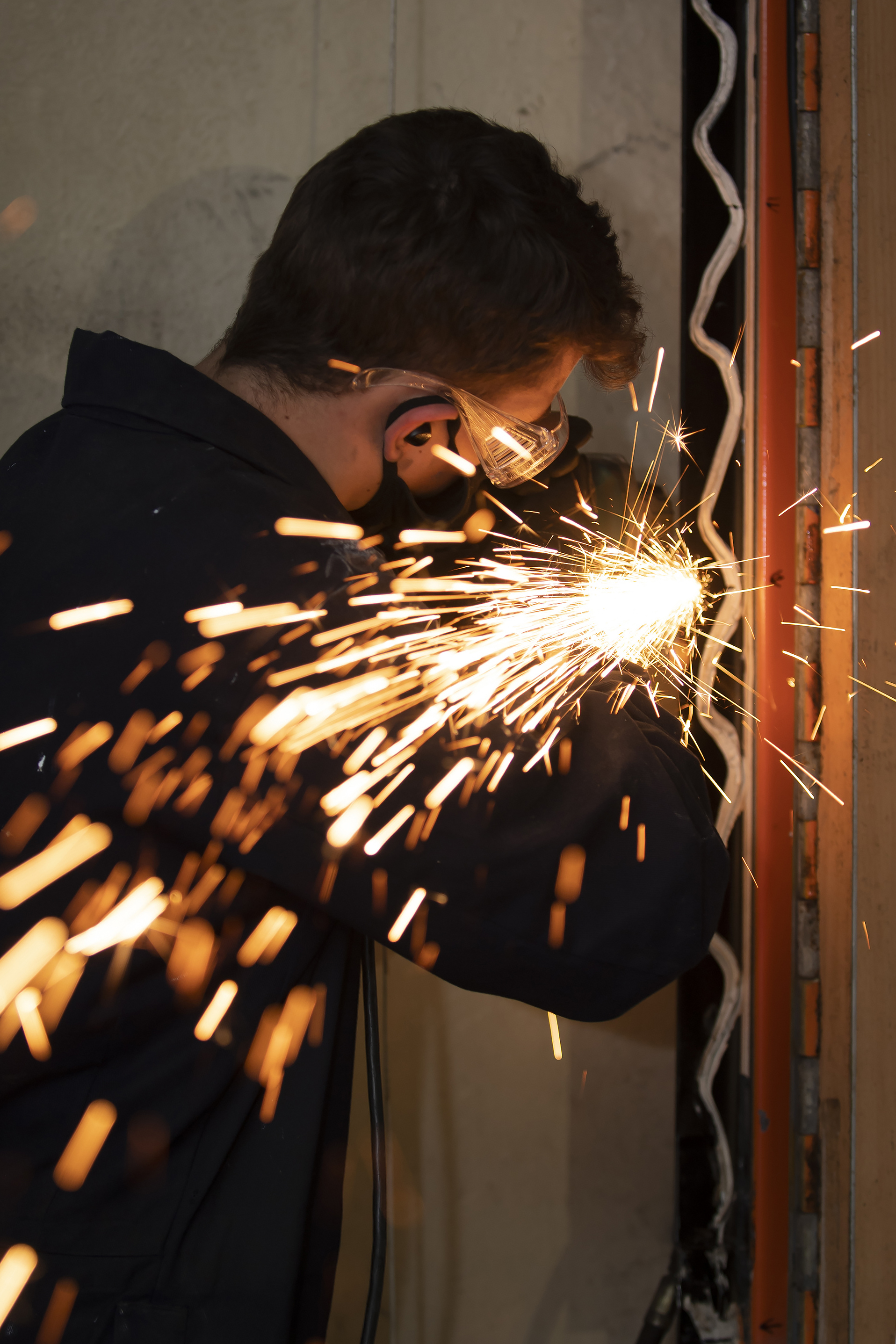
A member of the Royal Electrical and Mechanical Engineers (REME) constructing a Mobile Test Unit (MTU).

In April 2020, British Army personnel assisted at a drive-thru COVID-19 testing centre in Glasgow, Scotland. During the same month, British Army personnel also assisted at a COVID-19 testing centre in Wembley, England. This predated a wider deployment of military personnel to at least 96 mobile testing centres on 26 April 2020 as the government sought an official target of 100,000 COVID-19 tests per day. These testing centres were established in hard-to-reach areas, police stations, fire stations, care homes, prisons and benefit centres. By 1 May 2020, 1,500 military personnel were involved in carrying out COVID-19 tests at 92 mobile testing units across the country and the government subsequently announced it had passed its target of 100,000 tests per day.

In November 2020, as a second national lockdown was imposed in England, Prime Minister Boris Johnson announced that the military would be assisting with mass COVID-19 testing in Liverpool as a pilot scheme for what may become "a powerful new weapon" deployed across the country against COVID-19. Over 2,000 troops from 16 units became involved with the logistics and delivery of the programme, including 8 Engineer Brigade, 1st Battalion The Yorkshire Regiment, the King's Royal Hussars, 19 Regiment Royal Artillery, 1st Battalion Irish Guards, 39 Regiment Royal Engineers and 1st Battalion The Rifles. These units were later awarded the Freedom of Liverpool and commemorative challenge coins for their help in lowering infection rates from 680 per 100,000 people to less than 100. Later in the month, the military began training civilians to take over their testing duties. A 150-strong team of RAF personnel were then deployed to Merthyr Tydfil in Wales to carry out mass testing there. In December 2020, Medway in Kent became the third location to undergo mass testing with 175 military personnel involved, including from 35 Engineer Regiment. On 18 Dec 2020 a further 130 RAF personnel deployed to Swadlincote in South Derbyshire to conduct community testing at 3 sites in the town, supporting Derbyshire County Council. Further locations, including in Lancashire, Greater Manchester and Kirklees also underwent mass testing by 4 January 2021.

On Christmas Day in 2020, 1,100 military personnel were deployed to deliver COVID-19 testing kits to around 4,000 hauliers waiting in Kent after France closed its border with the UK due to COVID-19. They worked alongside military personnel from Poland, as well as French firefighters. Under the operational code-name Operation Rose, the British units involved included 70 Gurkha Field Squadron, 36 Engineer Regiment from the British Army and No. 600 Squadron RAF from the RAF. In the days following, the government announced that the military would be assisting with the testing of secondary school pupils and college students in England, however schools and colleges were soon re-closed as the country entered another national lockdown in January 2021.

=== Vaccine rollout ===
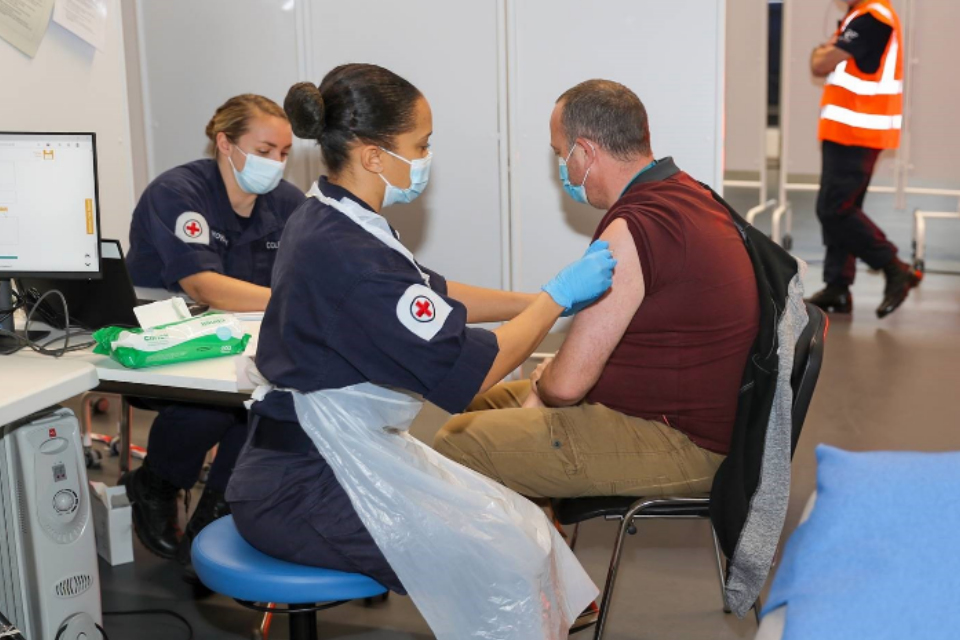
Royal Navy personnel administrating a COVID vaccine at a centre in Bristol in 2021

In December 2020, the military deployed planners to help with the COVID-19 vaccination rollouts in England, Wales and Scotland. The military then helped with the construction of vaccination centres around the country, with the first in Bristol, England.

On 9 January 2021, Prime Minister Boris Johnson announced that the British Army would be assisting with the national COVID-19 vaccine rollout. In a televised statement, the Prime Minister explained that the army would be helping reach a goal for over 1,000 GP-led sites in England offering "hundreds of thousands" of vaccinations each day by 15 January. Brigadier Phil Prosser was made Commander of Military Support to the Vaccine Delivery Programme. In a statement, he described the logistic operation as "unparalleled in its scale and complexity".

In December 2021, 750 military personnel were made available to support the NHS, the Department of Health and Social Care and the Scottish Government in response to rising cases caused by the Omicron variant. Over 100 were already deployed in Scotland in support of the vaccine rollout, whilst 600 more were made available to NHS England.

=== Other support ===
Operation Rescript saw the provision of military planners to local councils and civilian authorities. In April 2020, military planners, including French military personnel, were deployed from NATO's Allied Rapid Reaction Corps in Gloucestershire to London to assist with planning. British Army and Royal Marines officers also provided planning support to NHS Lothian.

On 18 March 2020, scientists from the Defence Science and Technology Laboratory (Dstl) began providing hazard assessment, microbiological testing and operational analysis support to the Government dealing with COVID-19. In late April, these scientists trialed mosquito repellent for its ability to fight coronavirus at their laboratory in Porton Down. The laboratory also produced 21,000 units of fit test solution used to test the fit of face masks, in addition to speeding up the decontamination of vehicles used by ambulance services.

Military personnel were also tasked with driving oxygen tankers for the NHS. On 22 April 2020, RAF Leeming helped trial a COVID-19 contact tracing phone application, which subsequently became the core component to the government's NHS Test and Trace service.

The British Army developed a spray which can kill the pandemic strain of coronavirus, named the Virusend formula. Around 50,000 bottles were distributed to military personnel working alongside the NHS during the pandemic.

The logistics depot at MoD Donnington was used to distribute medical supplies, with over 10,500 pieces of critical care medical equipment being delivered to NHS Trusts and hospitals by 1 June 2020.

Northern Ireland requested military assistance in September 2021 after the COVID-19 crisis caused unprecedented pressure to its hospitals. Up to 100 armed forces medics were requested to support Belfast City Hospital and Ulster Hospital.

== Scale ==
The scale of Operation Rescript grew in proportion to the pandemic. On 12 April 2020, during the pandemic's first wave, the COVID Support Force had responded to 76 requests for assistance from government ministries with 2,680 personnel deployed from a total of 23,000 on standby. 2,300 vehicles were also in use, as temporary ambulances or for transportation, in 34 locations across the country. During the same month, Chief of the Defence Staff General Sir Nick Carter described the operation as the "single greatest logistic challenge" he had come across. As the first wave subdued, the CSF was downscaled by 12,500 personnel to a force of 7,500 on 20 May 2020, in line with a consistent decrease in daily COVID-19 cases. 162 MACA requests had been responded to, in addition to 29,100 COVID-19 testing kits being delivered to 191 facilities.

In January 2021, the Ministry of Defence revealed that over 5,000 military personnel were deployed on 70 different tasks, making it the largest "homeland military operation in peacetime". It also revealed that nearly 3,300 military personnel had tested positive for the virus since the outbreak began, with the majority of them contracting the virus in the United Kingdom.

According to the Ministry of Defence, even at its peak readiness of 20,000 personnel on standby, Operation Rescript placed no constraints on the ministry's prioritised operations and defence outputs, such as Quick Reaction Alert, Operation Shader and Operation Temperer.

== Medal ==
Following a Freedom Of Information (FOI) request in April 2021 to the Ministry of Defence, it was stated that Operation Rescript was under consideration for medallic reward by the Cabinet Office. A subsequent FOI request was made to the Cabinet Office in December 2021 to which it was stated documentation or minutes relating to the creation of an Operation Rescript medal was not held by the Cabinet Office and that the Ministry of Defence should be consulted. In February 2022, a petition was launched via the UK Parliament petitions website asking the UK Government to consider the introduction of an Operation Rescript medal.
