= NHS Nightingale Hospital North East =

Temporary NHS COVID-19 hospital set up in Washington

- Newcastle upon Tyne Hospitals NHS Foundation Trust
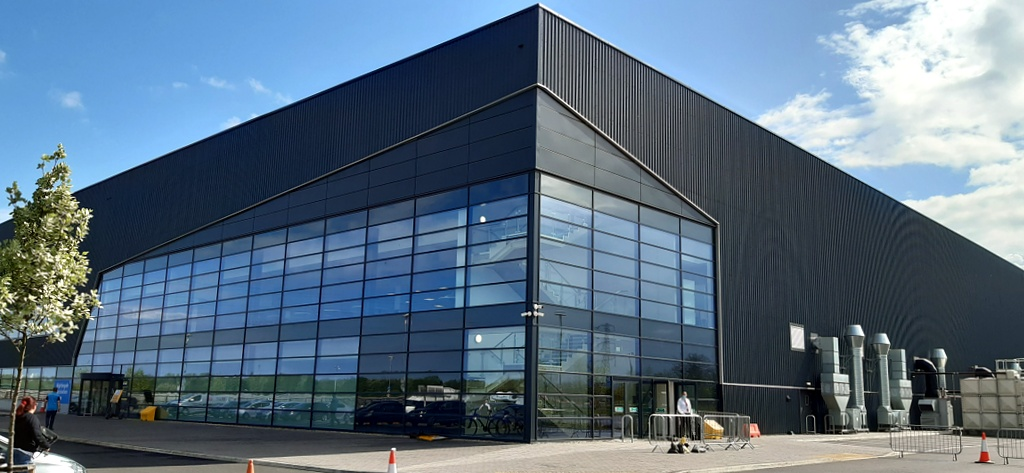

Geography
- Location: Centre of Excellence for Sustainable Advanced Manufacturing, Washington, Tyne and Wear
- Coordinates: 54.92396°N 1.47837°W

Organisation
- Care system: NHS England
- Type: COVID-19 critical care Field hospital

Services
- Beds: up to 460 people

History
- Opened: 5 May 2020
- Closed: 31 March 2022

Links
- Website: coronavirus.newcastle-hospitals.nhs.uk/nhs-nightingale-north-east/

The NHS Nightingale Hospital North East was one of the temporary NHS Nightingale Hospitals set up by NHS England to help to deal with the COVID-19 pandemic. It was constructed inside the Centre of Excellence for Sustainable Advanced Manufacturing, Washington.

== Background ==
To add extra critical care capacity during the COVID-19 epidemic in England, and to treat those with COVID-19, plans were made to create further temporary hospital spaces for those in need of treatment and care. They have been named "Nightingale Hospitals", after Florence Nightingale who came to prominence for nursing soldiers during the Crimean War and is regarded as the founder of modern nursing.

On 12 October, 2020 amidst a rise in cases in Northern England, the hospital was placed on standby.

== Details ==
The site was converted to be a hospital at the cost of £23.5 million. The site had 460 beds available with the building divided into 16 wards. It was operated by Newcastle upon Tyne Hospitals NHS Foundation Trust. The hospital has been prepared by the British Armed forces working with the local NHS Trusts. County Durham MP Richard Holden said, when announcing the hospital on 10 April, that it was expected to be open for patients in the following two weeks.

The hospital was officially opened on 5 May 2020, in a virtual ceremony, by Matt Hancock (Secretary of State for Health). The opening ceremony also featured television celebrities Ant and Dec, football pundit Alan Shearer and cricketer Ben Stokes.

It was not a conventional walk-in hospital - only patients who are already inpatients in other hospitals in the region and meet certain criteria were to be admitted. They would have stayed at the hospital until they were assessed as being ready to move back to a local hospital.

The hospital was kept on standby to treat Covid patients but did not admit a single patient. On 12 October 2020 amidst a rise in cases in Northern England, the hospital was placed on readiness to receive patients, but again did not.

In January 2021 NHS England admitted that it would not be admitting any patients into the specially created hospital. Later the same month it was announced that the hospital was to become instead a mass vaccination centre.

On 31 March 2022 the hospital was closed for the final time.

== Transportation ==
On 25 January 2021, Go North East introduced a bus route branded ConnectorShuttle which operated between Concord bus station and the Nightingale Hospital. The service connected with bus route 56 at the bus station.

== See also ==
- Dragon's Heart Hospital
- NHS Louisa Jordan
- NHS Nightingale Hospital Birmingham
- NHS Nightingale Hospital London
- NHS Nightingale Hospital North West
- NHS Nightingale Hospital Yorkshire and the Humber
