= IAMP =

IAMP may refer to:

- Immaterial and Missing Power
- International Association of Mathematical Physics
- International Association for Military Pedagogy
- International Advanced Manufacturing Park, a business part in Washington, UK
