= National Exhibition Centre =

Exhibition and conference centre in Solihull near Birmingham, England

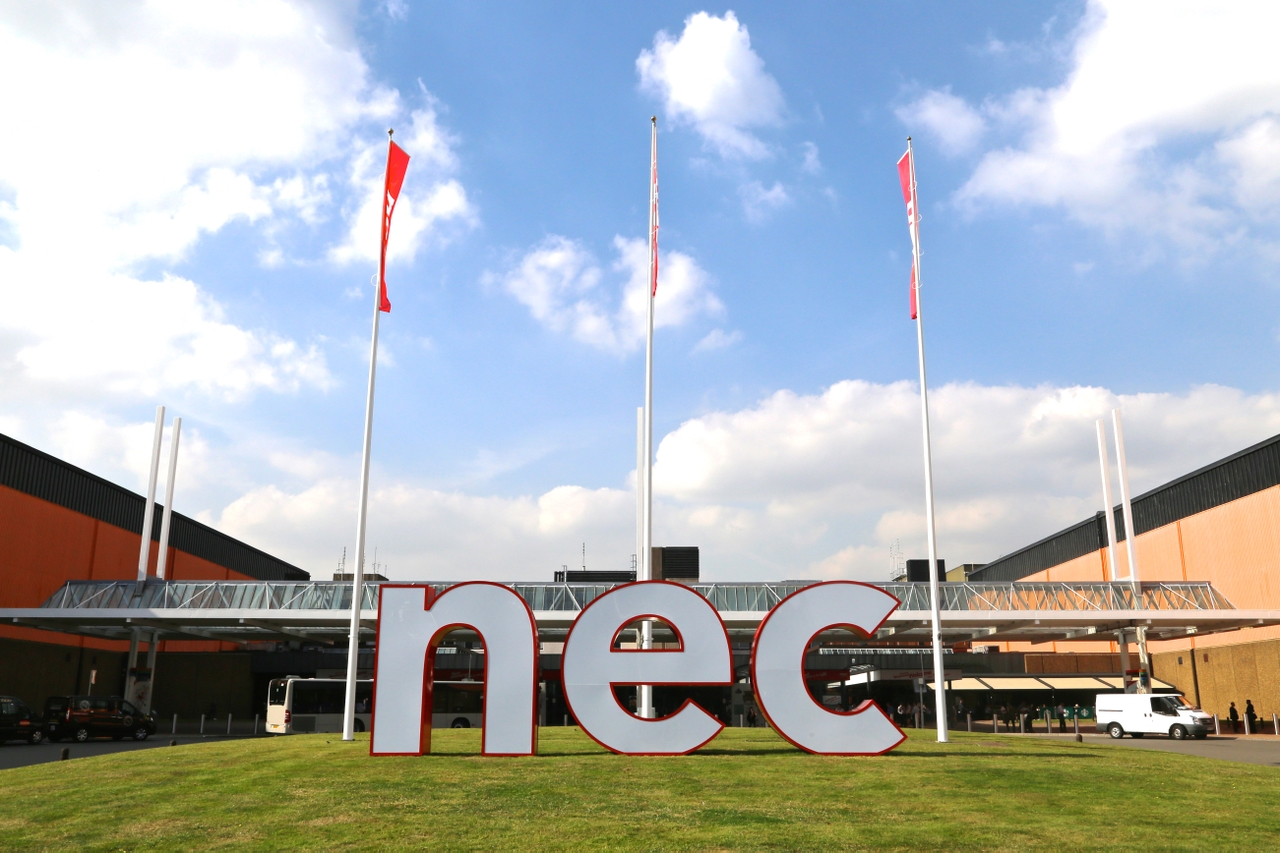
- The main entrance to the NEC (July 2015)
- Interactive map of National Exhibition Centre
- Location: Marston Green, Solihull, England
- Coordinates: 52°27′12″N 1°43′10″W
- Owner: The Blackstone Group (since 2018)
- Operator: NEC Group
- Public transit: Birmingham International railway station

Construction
- Built: 16 February 1973 to 1976
- Opened: 2 February 1976
- Renovated: 2009, 2018
- Expanded: 1980, 1989, 1993, 1998
- Architects: Edward Mills; Seymour Harris

Website
- thenec.co.uk

The National Exhibition Centre (NEC) is an exhibition centre located in Marston Green in the Metropolitan Borough of Solihull, near the city of Birmingham. It is near junction 6 of the M42 motorway, and is adjacent to Birmingham Airport and Birmingham International railway station. It was opened by Queen Elizabeth II in 1976. On its 50th anniversary in 2026, The NEC was rebranded to the Nation's Experience Capital.

== History ==
The NEC was originally going to be built adjacent to the M1 motorway (junction 21) near Leicester but it was turned down by Leicestershire County Council with claims that "The big shows won't move away from London".

In November 1971, the Secretary of State for the Environment granted outline planning approval for the National Exhibition Centre. On 16 February 1973, then Prime Minister Edward Heath travelled from London to cut a white ribbon and initiate its construction, which was carried out by RM Douglas (known today as Tilbury Douglas), to a design by Edward Mills. The NEC was opened by Queen Elizabeth II on 2 February 1976.

=== Expansion of the complex ===
The seventh hall of the NEC complex, a multi-purpose indoor arena named the Birmingham International Arena (currently branded BP Pulse Live), opened in December 1980.

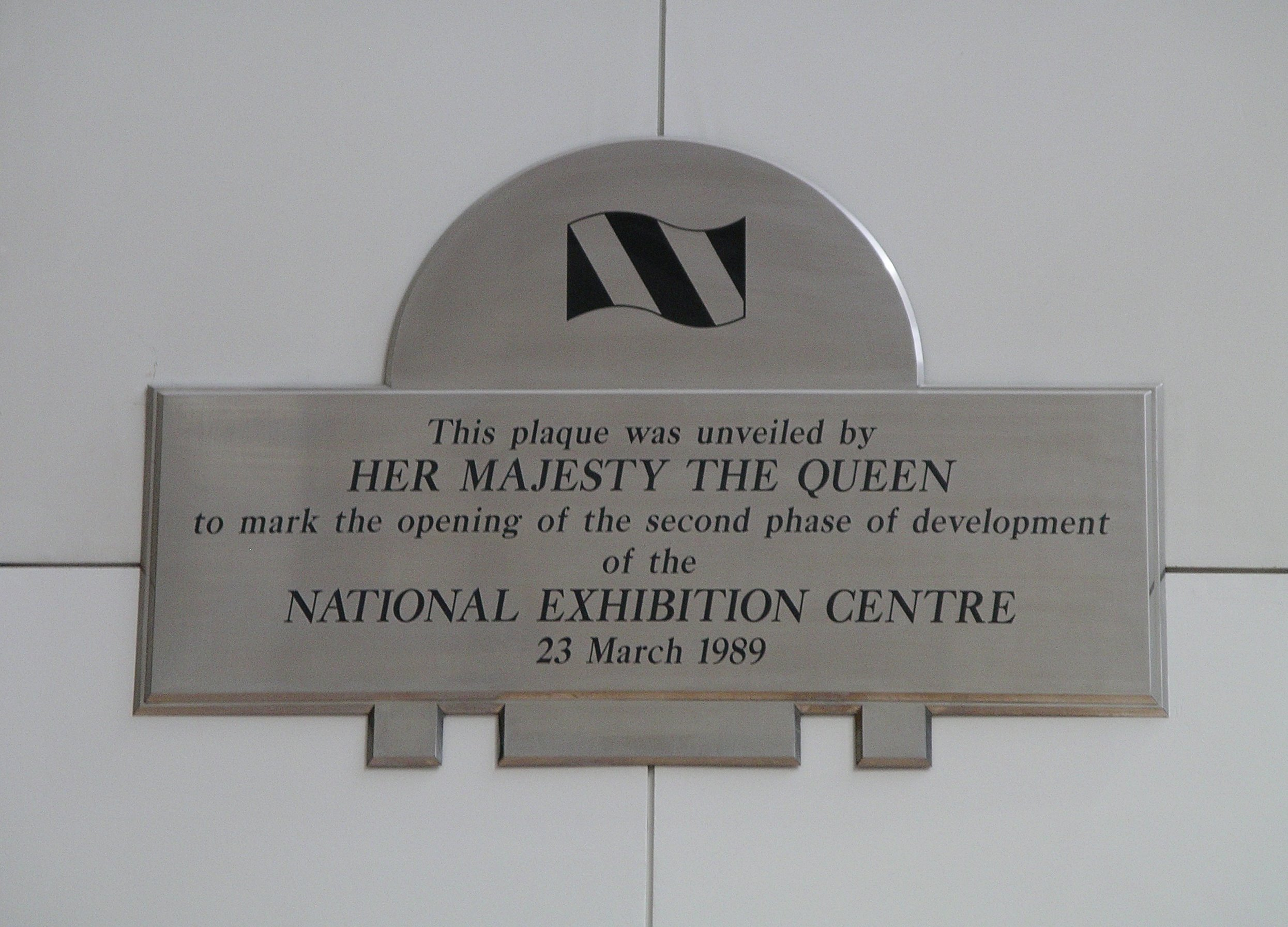
Plaque commemorating the opening of the "second phase of development" in 1989

On 23 March 1989, Queen Elizabeth II opened three new halls. Four more halls were added in 1993, and another four new halls, designed by Seymour Harris and built by John Laing, were completed in January 1998.

A five-year, £40 million venue improvement programme which saw improvements made to everything from the car parking to signage, seating and catering was carried out between 2006 and 2011.

== Exhibitions ==
The NEC has 18 interconnected halls covering 186,000 m^{2} (2,000,000 sq ft) of floor space, 32 purpose-built conference suites and 440 acres of flexible space. Regular exhibitions in the past have included the British International Motor Show and the international dog show Crufts.

The NEC has 16,500 parking spaces spread around the site, with a free shuttle bus service operating to and from the car parks.

== NEC Group ==
Parent company the NEC Group also owns and operates the Arena Birmingham and ICC Birmingham, both in central Birmingham, and bp pulse LIVE, based on The NEC site. Birmingham City Council placed the NEC Group up for sale in 2014. After short-listing three contenders to purchase the company, the sale to Lloyds Development Capital, the private equity unit of Lloyds Banking Group, was completed in January 2015 for £307 million. In October 2018, Blackstone acquired NEC Group from Lloyds Development Capital, paying around £800 million for the group.

== Emergency hospital ==
From early April 2020 the NEC housed NHS Nightingale Hospital Birmingham, an emergency hospital scheduled to open on 10 April, and receive its first patients on 12 April, as part of a network of NHS Nightingale Hospitals in response to the COVID-19 pandemic. On 1 April 2021 the hospital was closed without ever treating a patient.

== Nations Experience Capital ==
For the NEC's 50th anniversary, it was rebranded as the Nation's Experience Capital on 26 February 2026, with the physical site unified under the name "The NEC Campus".

== Gallery ==
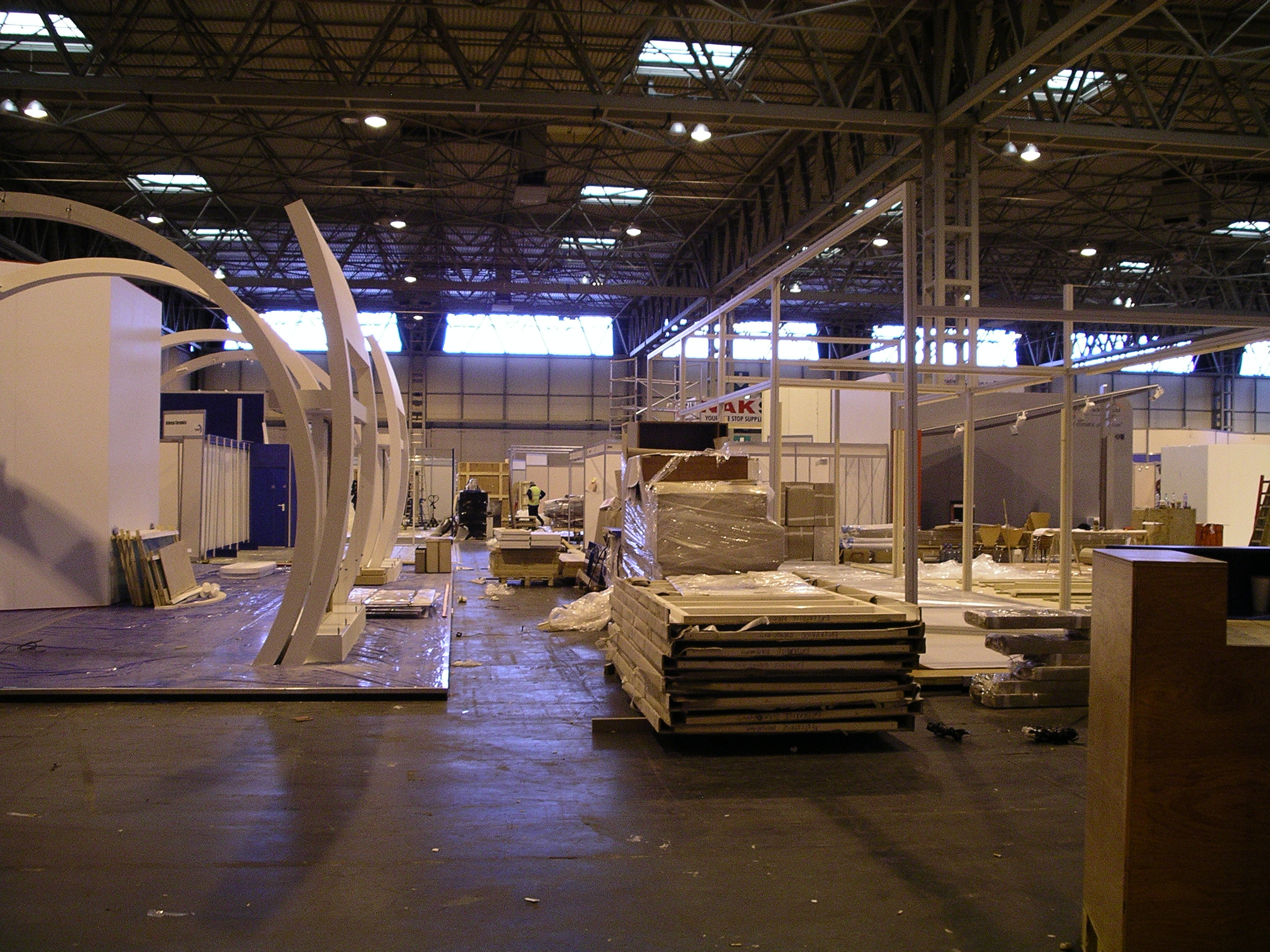
Preparations for an exhibition in Hall 3a

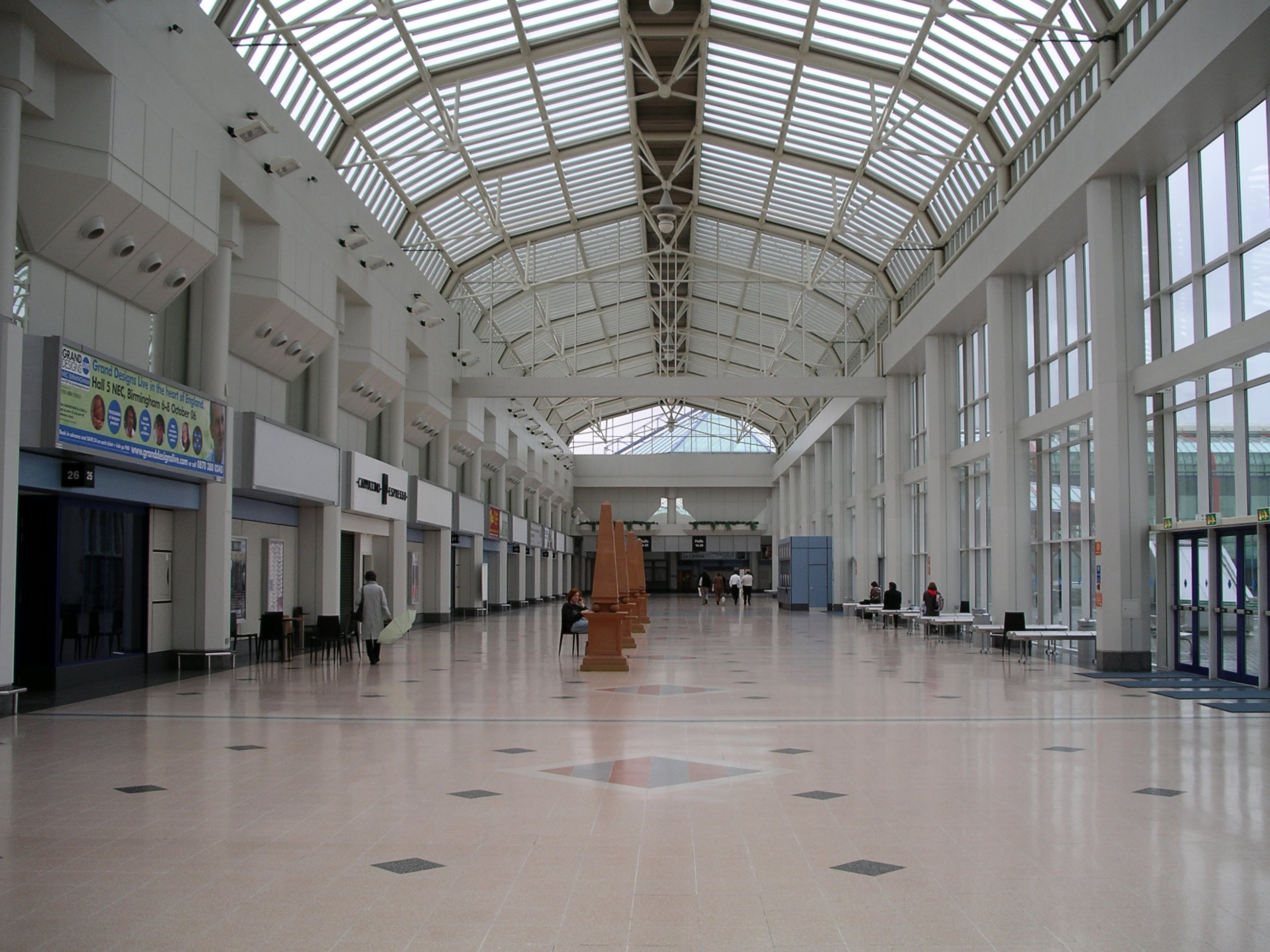
View from inside the atrium

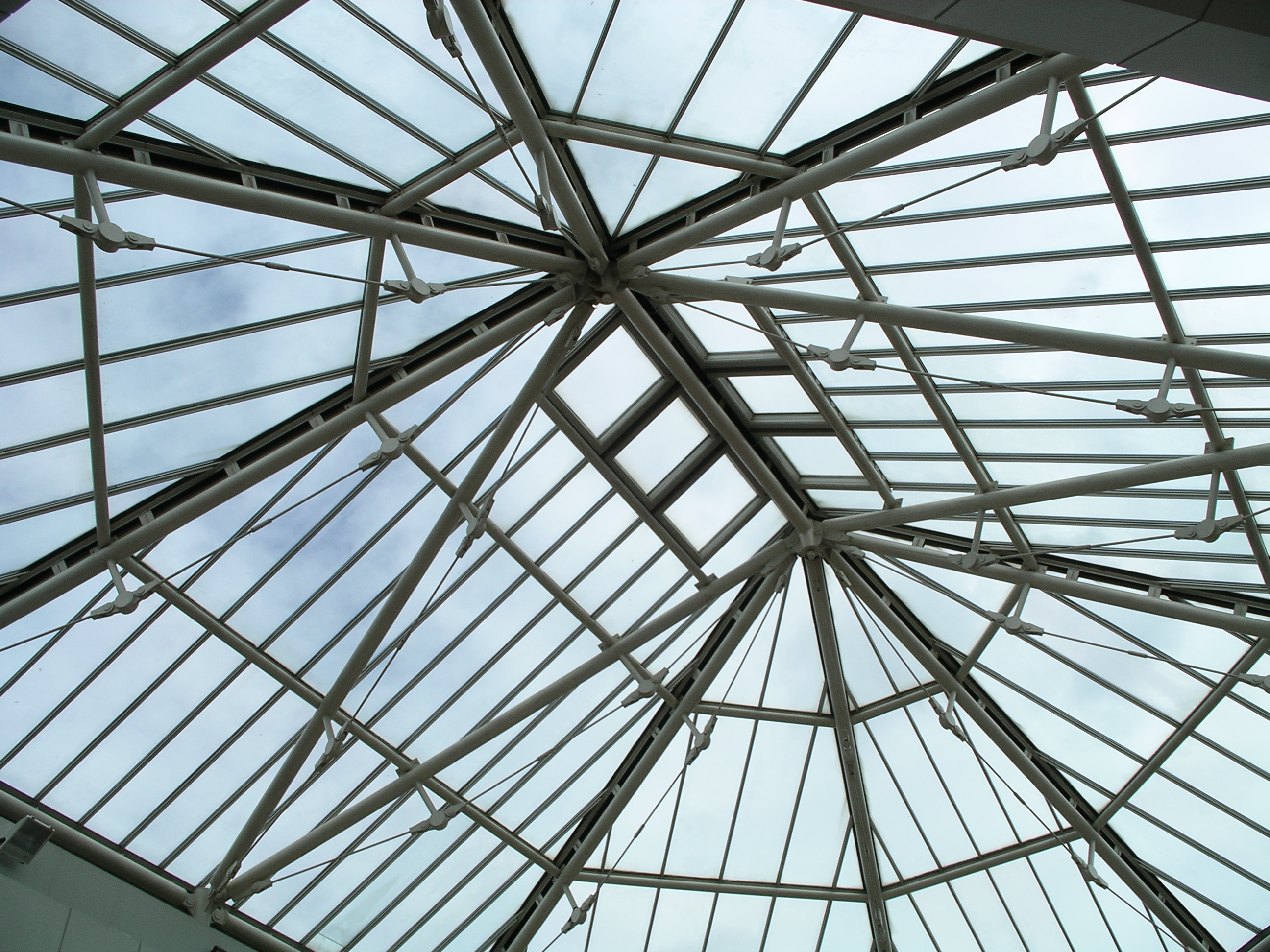
Atrium roof structure

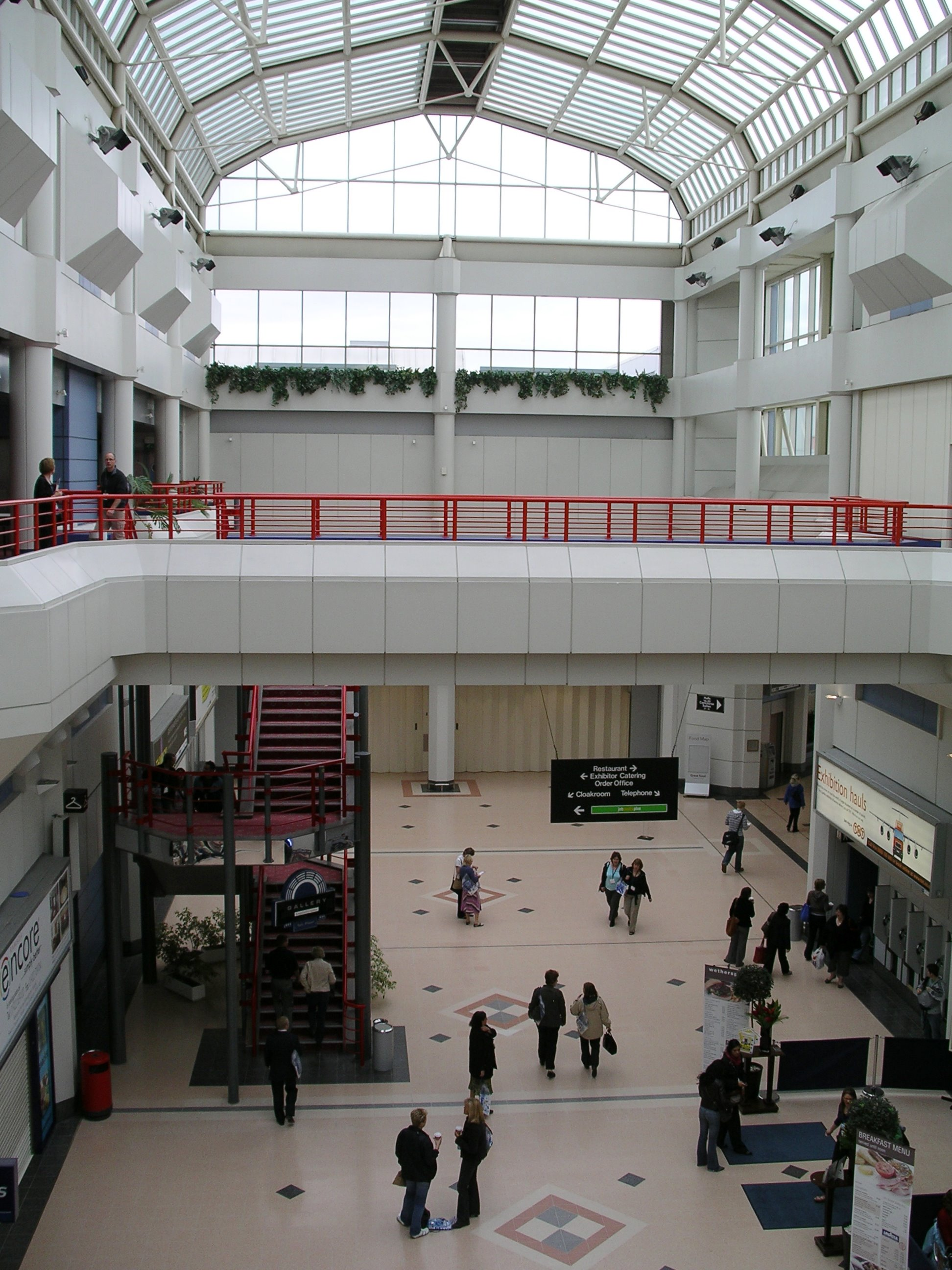
The atrium showing an upper level called the Gallery

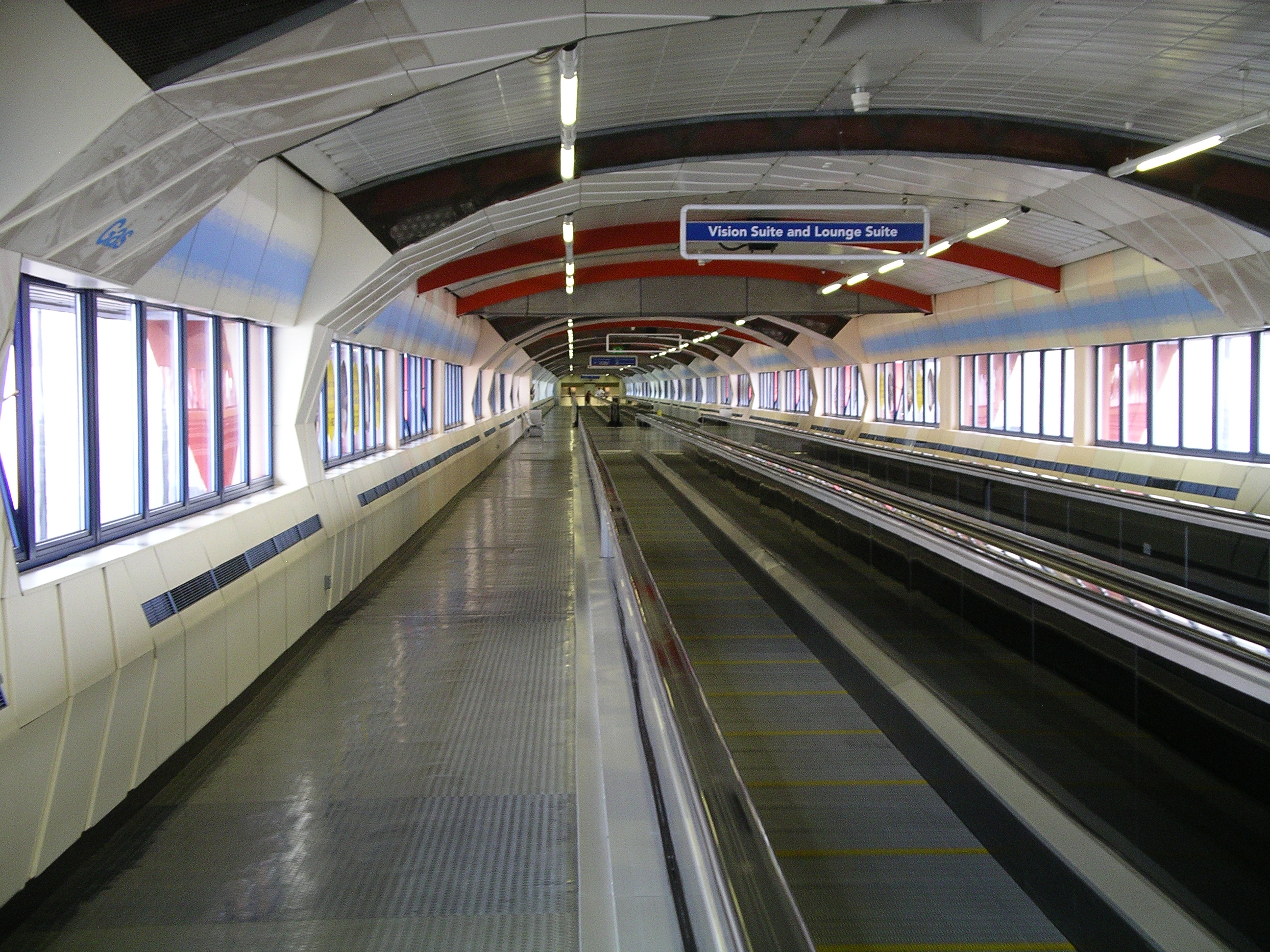
Moving walkway

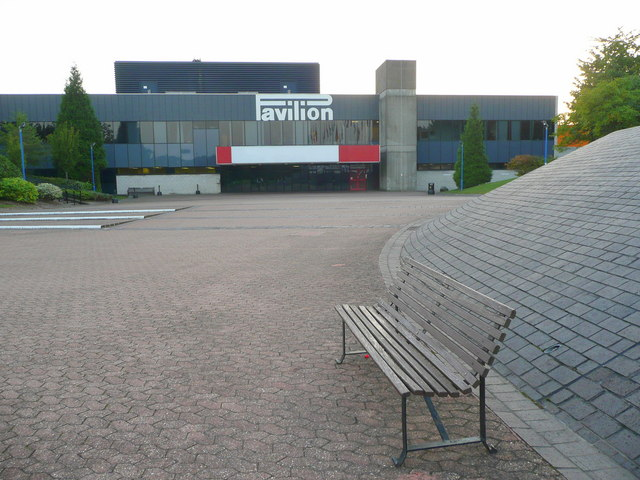
NEC Pavilion (2008)

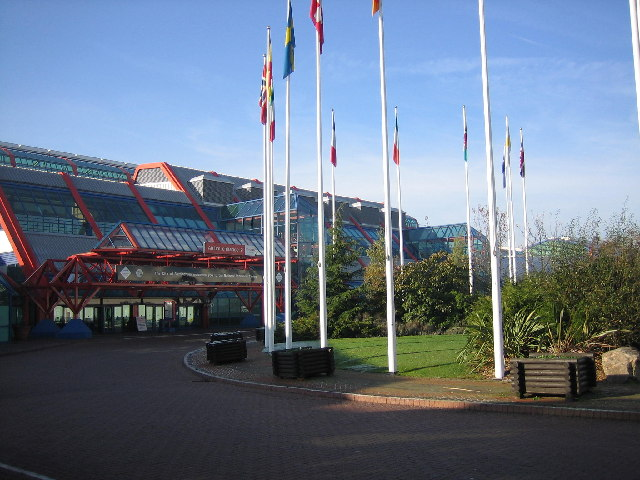
NEC Atrium entrance 2 (2005)

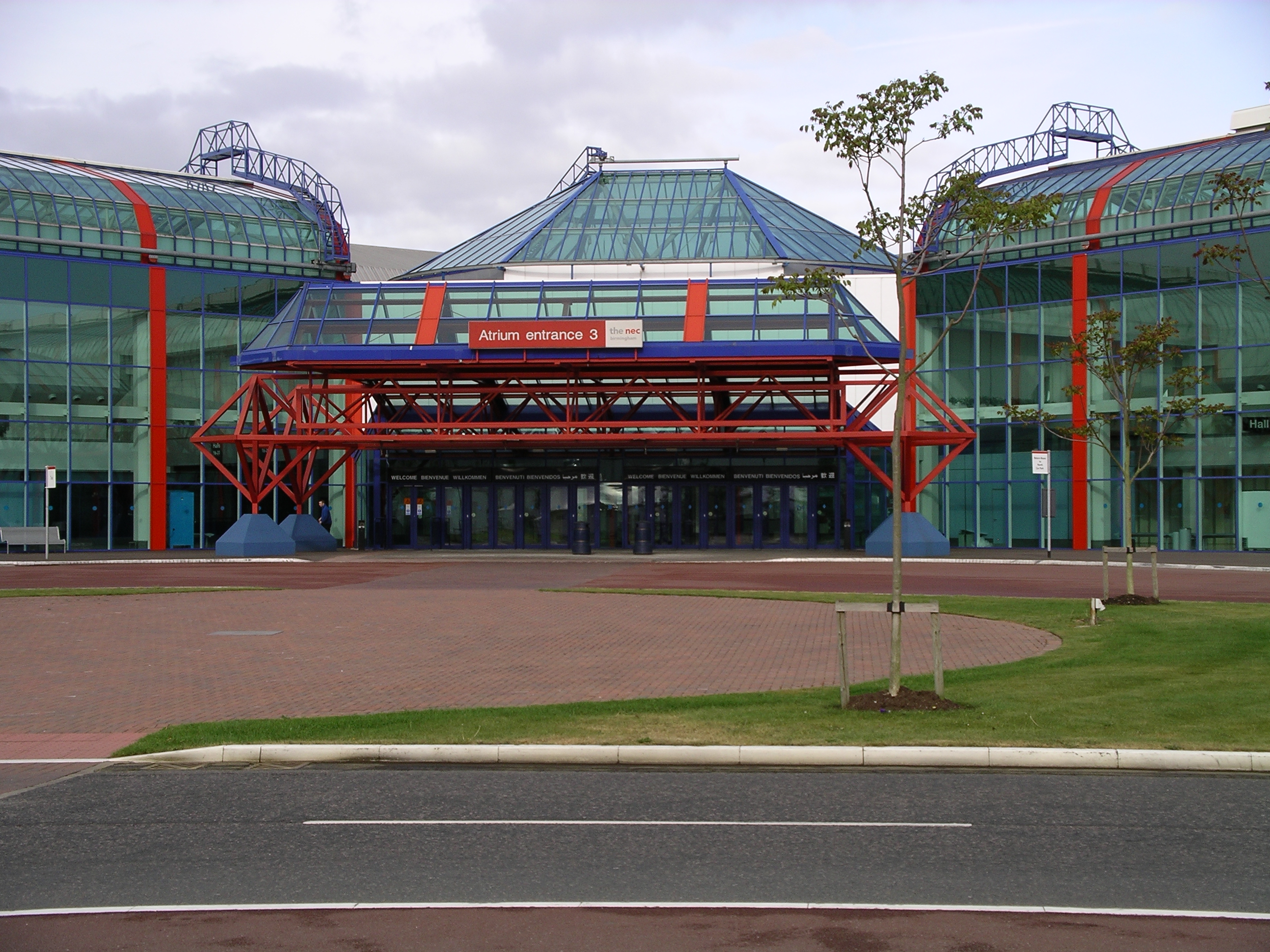
NEC Atrium entrance 3 (2007)

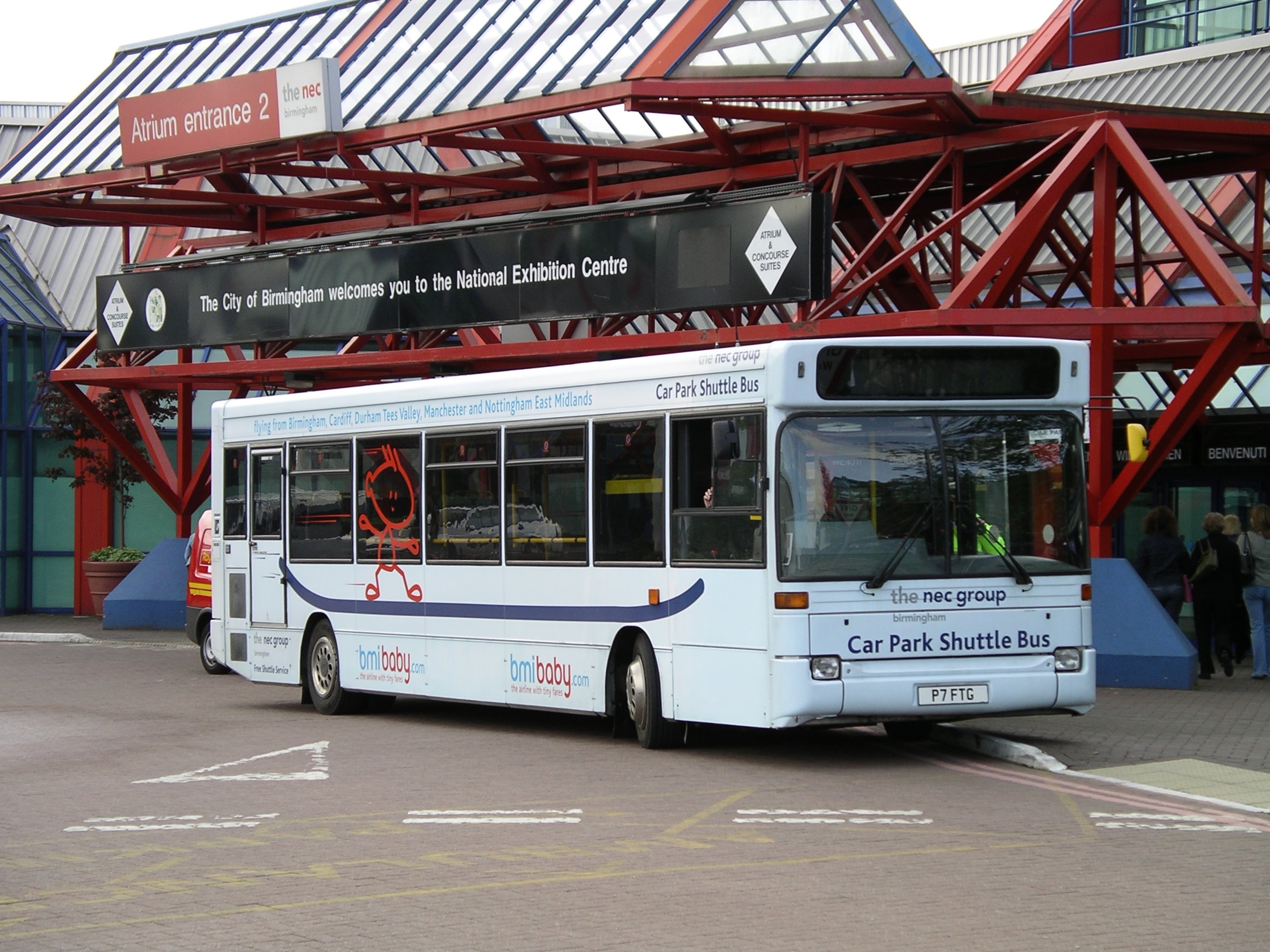
An NEC Plaxton Pointer 1 bodied Dennis Dart SLF shuttle bus outside atrium entrance 2
