= Charles Knight (cardiologist) =

Professor of cardiology and hospital CEO

Professor Charles Knight OBE FRCP
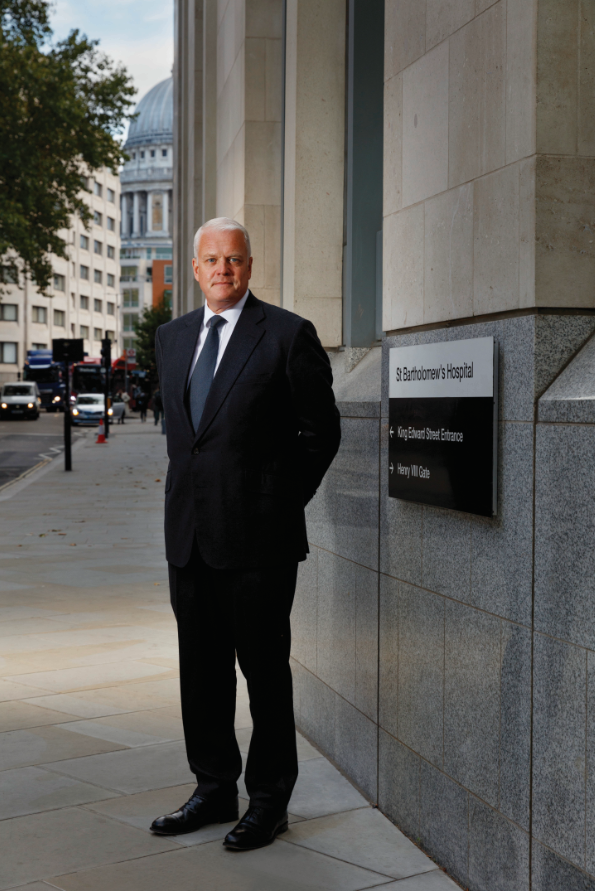
- Knight outside St Bartholomew's Hospital
- Education: University of Cambridge; University of Oxford
- Occupation: Cardiologist
- Known for: Alcohol septal ablation for hypertrophic cardiomyopathy; Formation of Barts Heart Centre at Barts Health NHS Trust (2015); Chief executive officer NHS Nightingale Hospital London (2020)
- Medical career
- Profession: Physician
- Institutions: St Bartholomew's Hospital
- Sub-specialties: Cardiology
- Research: Interventional Cardiology

Charles Knight is a British professor of cardiology and chief executive of St Bartholomew's Hospital, part of Barts Health NHS Trust.

In 1994 he assisted in the first percutaneous alcohol septal ablation, a non-surgical method for the treatment of hypertrophic obstructive cardiomyopathy as an alternative to open heart surgery, and subsequently specialised in the procedure. From 2010 he led the development of the Barts Heart Centre at Barts Health NHS Trust which opened in 2015 by merging cardiac services from the London Chest Hospital, The Heart Hospital and St Bartholomew's Hospital.

In 2020, Knight was appointed chief executive officer of NHS Nightingale Hospital London, established to care for people during the COVID-19 pandemic. In the same year he was awarded an OBE for services to the NHS and people with heart disease.

== Education ==
Charles Knight trained at Cambridge and Oxford universities.

== Career ==
In 1994, at the Royal Brompton Hospital, he assisted Ulrich Sigwart with the introduction of percutaneous alcohol septal ablation, a non-surgical method for the treatment of hypertrophic obstructive cardiomyopathy, as an alternative to open heart surgery. Knight subsequently specialised in the procedure.

From 2010 he led the development of the Barts Heart Centre at Barts Health NHS Trust which opened in 2015 by merging cardiac services from the London Chest Hospital, The Heart Hospital and St Bartholomew's Hospital to create one of the largest cardiac centres in Europe. In 2015 he was appointed as managing director and then chief executive of St Bartholomew's Hospital.

In March 2020, Knight was appointed chief executive officer of NHS Nightingale Hospital London, established to care for people during the COVID-19 pandemic. It was built in nine days with a 4,000 bed capacity. The following month, at a Royal Society of Medicine webinar, he stated his concern over the aversion of some people to seek medical attention for problems unrelated to COVID-19. In April 2021, following Prince Phillip's discharge from Barts, Knight received flowers from the Queen, on behalf of staff at Barts on the anniversary of the first COVID-19 lockdown.

In 2023 Knight gave a Gresham College lecture recounting the history of St Bartholomew's Hospital to mark its 900th anniversary.

== Other roles ==
He was associate editor of the journal Heart until 2014, and chair of the London Cardiology Speciality Training Committee. He was a member of the Royal College of Physicians Cardiology Speciality Advisory Committee. From 2008 to 2011 he served as honorary secretary of the British Cardiovascular Society, where he had also been a member of its training committee.

He is a trustee of Barts Heritage, Fellow of the Royal College of Physicians, and is an honorary professor at the William Harvey Research Institute at Queen Mary University of London.

== Awards ==
In July 2020, he received the Freedom of the City of London for his work during the COVID-19 pandemic. In October 2020, he was awarded an OBE for services to the NHS and people with heart disease.

== Selected publications ==
He has published over 100 research papers.

=== Articles ===
- Knight, C.; Kurbaan, A. S.; Seggewiss, H.; Henein, M.; Gunning, M.; Harrington, D.; Fassbender, D.; Gleichmann, U.; Sigwart, U. (15 April 1997). "Nonsurgical septal reduction for hypertrophic obstructive cardiomyopathy: outcome in the first series of patients". Circulation. 95 (8): 2075–2081. doi:10.1161/01.cir.95.8.2075. ISSN 0009-7322. PMID 9133518. (Co-author)
- Baker, Christopher S.R; Wragg, Andrew; Kumar, Sanjay; De Palma, Rodney; Baker, Laurence R.I; Knight, Charles J. (June 2003). "A rapid protocol for the prevention of contrast-induced renal dysfunction: the RAPPID study". Journal of the American College of Cardiology. 41 (12): 2114–2118. doi:10.1016/s0735-1097(03)00487-x. ISSN 0735-1097. PMID 12821233. (Co-author)
- Graham, J. J.; Timmis, A.; Cooper, J.; Ramdany, S.; Deaner, A.; Ranjadayalan, K.; Knight, C. (March 2006). "Impact of the National Service Framework for coronary heart disease on treatment and outcome of patients with acute coronary syndromes". Heart (British Cardiac Society). 92 (3): 301–306. doi:10.1136/hrt.2004.051466. ISSN 1468-201X. PMC 1860838. PMID 15908481. (Co-author)
- Campbell, Niall G.; Varagunam, Mira; Sawhney, Vinit; Ahuja, Kumar R.; Salahuddin, Nabila; De Palma, Rodney; Rothman, Martin T.; Wragg, Andrew; Yaqoob, Muhammed M.; Knight, Charles J. (January 2012). "Mild chronic kidney disease is an independent predictor of long-term mortality after emergency angiography and primary percutaneous intervention in patients with ST-elevation myocardial infarction". Heart (British Cardiac Society). 98 (1): 42–47. doi:10.1136/heartjnl-2011-300024. ISSN 1468-201X. PMID 21880649. S2CID 8683411. (Co-author)
- Rathod, Krishnaraj S.; Jones, Daniel A.; Gallagher, Sean M.; Bromage, Daniel I.; Whitbread, Mark; Archbold, Andrew R.; Jain, Ajay K.; Mathur, Anthony; Wragg, Andrew; Knight, Charles J. (28 June 2013). "Out-of-hours primary percutaneous coronary intervention for ST-elevation myocardial infarction is not associated with excess mortality: a study of 3347 patients treated in an integrated cardiac network". BMJ Open. 3 (6) e003063. doi:10.1136/bmjopen-2013-003063. ISSN 2044-6055. PMC 3696864. PMID 23811175. (Co-author)
