= International Advanced Manufacturing Park =

Coordinates: 54.92396°N 1.47837°W

- Industry: Manufacturing, research and development
- Headquarters: Washington, Tyne and Wear, United Kingdom
- Website: iampnortheast.co.uk

The International Advanced Manufacturing Park is a British business park located in the City of Sunderland, Tyne and Wear. The site is located next to Nissan Motor Manufacturing UK, the UK's second largest car manufacturing site. It is a development hub for manufacturing in the region and is a joint venture between Sunderland City Council and South Tyneside Council. The concept for this development was influenced by the previous success of the Advanced Manufacturing Park (AMP) in Rotherham.

The International Advanced Manufacturing Park development is designated as an Enterprise Zone and is split into two phases; phase one is 125 acres (51 ha) acres of land with 1.68 million square feet (156×10^{3} m^{2}) of building area attracting more than £150 million of investment; phase two is an additional 245 acres (99 ha) of land. Henry Boot plc is a development partner for the project. The scheme intends to create 7000 jobs and work started in 2018.

The park is the site of the closed NHS Nightingale Hospital NE, a field hospital built to cater for COVID-19 patients in the North East, but never used.

== Centre of Excellence for Sustainable Advanced Manufacturing ==
Unit 5 of phase one the complex is known as the Centre of Excellence for Sustainable Advanced Manufacturing and was built in 2019. CESAM is a £54.5 million joint venture between North East Automotive Alliance, industry figures and universities including Sunderland University. The centre will work with companies as a research and development hub to help improve and innovate their digital and manufacturing processes.

The building is 126,279 sq. ft and has 300 car parking spaces. The project took 37 weeks to build.

=== NHS Nightingale Hospital NE ===
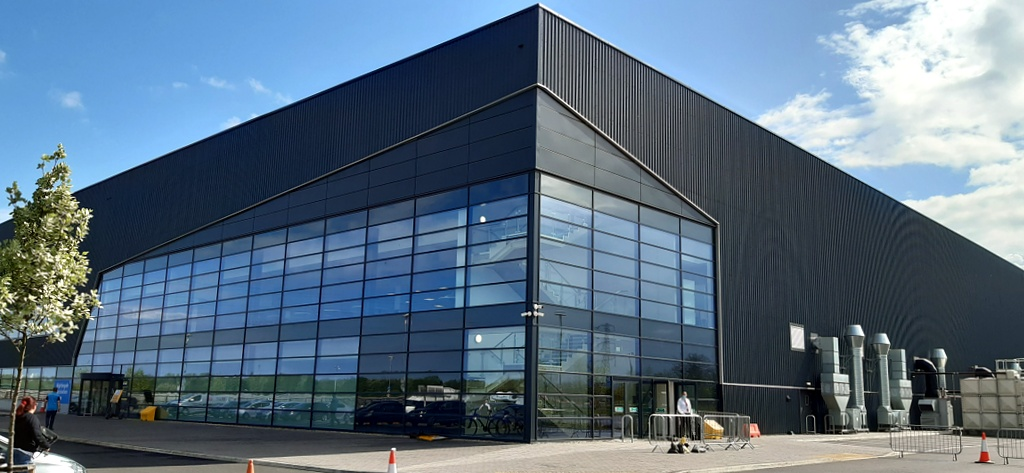
NHS Nightingale North East

In 2020, as part of the UK's response to the COVID-19 pandemic a number of NHS COVID-19 critical care hospitals needed to be set up and the IAMP's Centre of Excellence for Sustainable Advanced Manufacturing was selected as the location of the North East region's NHS Nightingale Hospital.

The site will have 460 beds available with the building divided into 16 wards. It will be operated by Newcastle upon Tyne Hospitals NHS Foundation Trust. The hospital has been prepared by the British Armed forces working with the local NHS Trusts. County Durham MP Richard Holden said when announcing the hospital on 10 April that is expected to be open for patients in the following two weeks.

== Location ==
The site is located just off the A19 road, next to the Nissan Motor Manufacturing UK car plant. Discussions have taken place with Nexus to assess the possibility of the extending the Tyne and Wear Metro to the business park which currently terminates at the South Hylton Metro Station on the other side of the River Wear.
