= NHS Nightingale Hospital Yorkshire and the Humber =

Temporary NHS COVID-19 hospital set up in Harrogate Convention Centre

- Leeds Teaching Hospitals NHS Trust
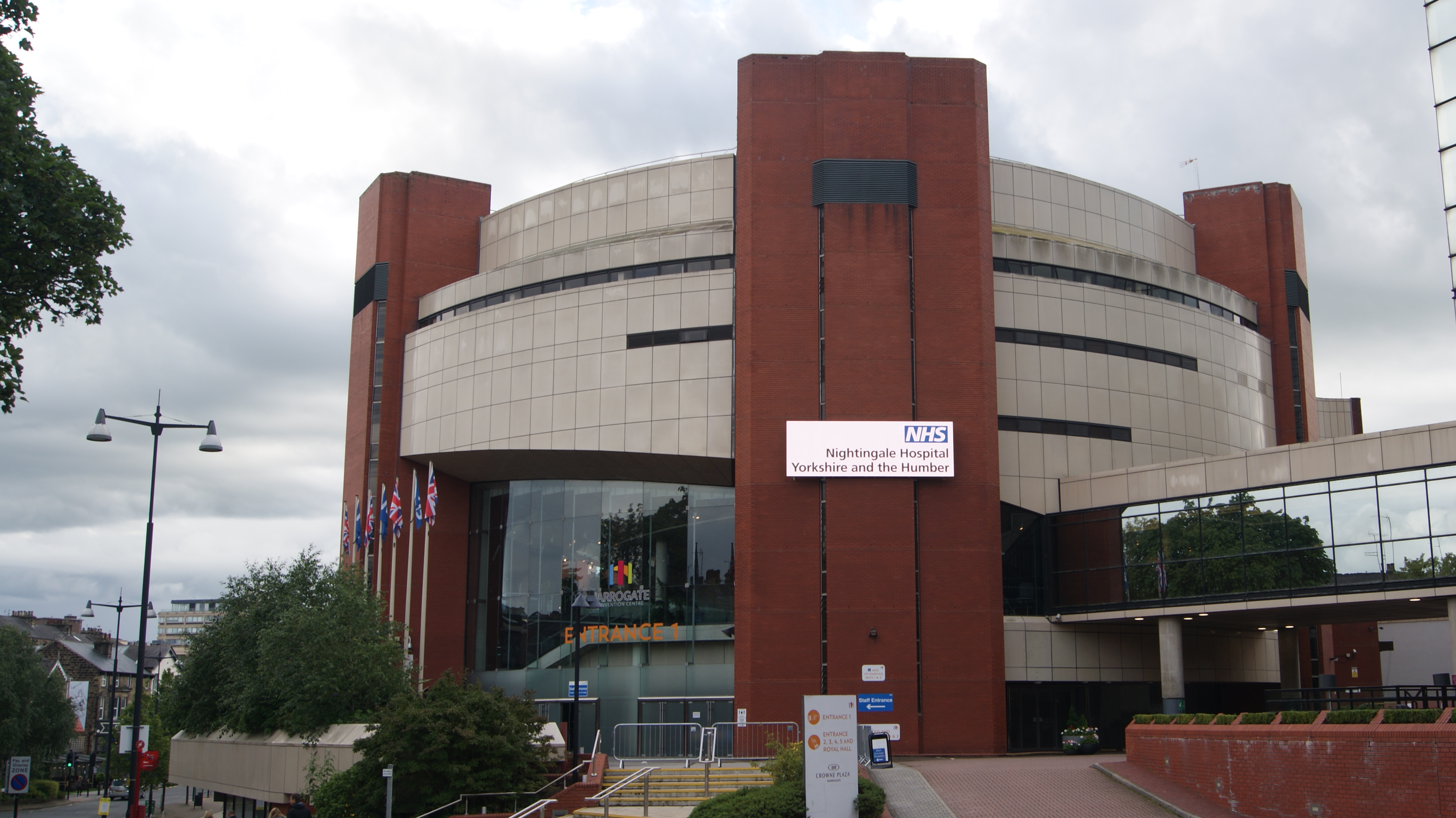
- View of the Harrogate Convention Centre in July 2020

Geography
- Location: Harrogate Convention Centre; King's Rd, Harrogate; HG1 5LA, Yorkshire
- Coordinates: 53°59′48.48″N 1°32′29″W

Organisation
- Care system: NHS England
- Type: COVID-19 critical care Field hospital

Services
- Beds: up to 500 people

History
- Opened: 21 April 2020
- Closed: March 2021

Links
- Website: https://www.leedsth.nhs.uk/nightingaleyh/

The NHS Nightingale Hospital Yorkshire and the Humber was one of the temporary NHS Nightingale Hospitals set up by NHS England in 2020 to help to deal with the COVID-19 pandemic. The hospital was constructed inside the Harrogate Convention Centre, Harrogate, and from 4 June 2020 was repurposed as a radiology diagnostic clinic.

In March 2021, it was confirmed the hospital would close.

== Background ==
To add extra critical care capacity during the COVID-19 epidemic in England, and to treat those with COVID-19, plans were made to create further temporary hospital spaces for those in need of treatment and care. They were named "Nightingale Hospitals", after Florence Nightingale who came to prominence for nursing soldiers during the Crimean War and is regarded as the founder of modern nursing.

== Opening ==
The hospital was initially rumoured, then announced as officially planned on 3 April 2020, and became ready to open on 14 April. It was formally opened, via video link, by 99-year-old fundraiser Captain Tom Moore. It was administered under Leeds Teaching Hospitals NHS Trust.

It initially had beds for up to 500 people. It was not a conventional walk-in hospital, and only patients who were already inpatients in other hospitals in the region and met certain criteria were to be admitted. They would stay at the hospital until they were assessed as being ready to move back to a local hospital.

== Usage ==
The hospital was not required to treat COVID-19 patients in April and May. Instead it was reopened as a radiology outpatient clinic, offering CT scanning, from 4 June 2020. Appointments would be available seven days a week, through Leeds Teaching Hospitals NHS Trust and Harrogate and District NHS Foundation Trust. In August, it was reported that this usage would continue until March 2021.

On 12 October 2020, amidst a rise in cases in Northern England, the hospital was placed on standby.

Its closure was confirmed in March 2021.

== Personnel ==
The following have been involved in the creation of the hospital:

- Paula Lorimer, Director of Harrogate Convention Centre
- Paul Cleminson, Pre-Construction Director for BAM Construction in the North East

== See also ==
- Dragon's Heart Hospital, Cardiff
- NHS Louisa Jordan, Glasgow
- NHS Nightingale Hospital Birmingham
- NHS Nightingale Hospital London
- NHS Nightingale Hospital North West, Manchester
