= NHS Nightingale Hospital London =

Temporary COVID-19 hospital, 2020–2021

- Barts Health NHS Trust

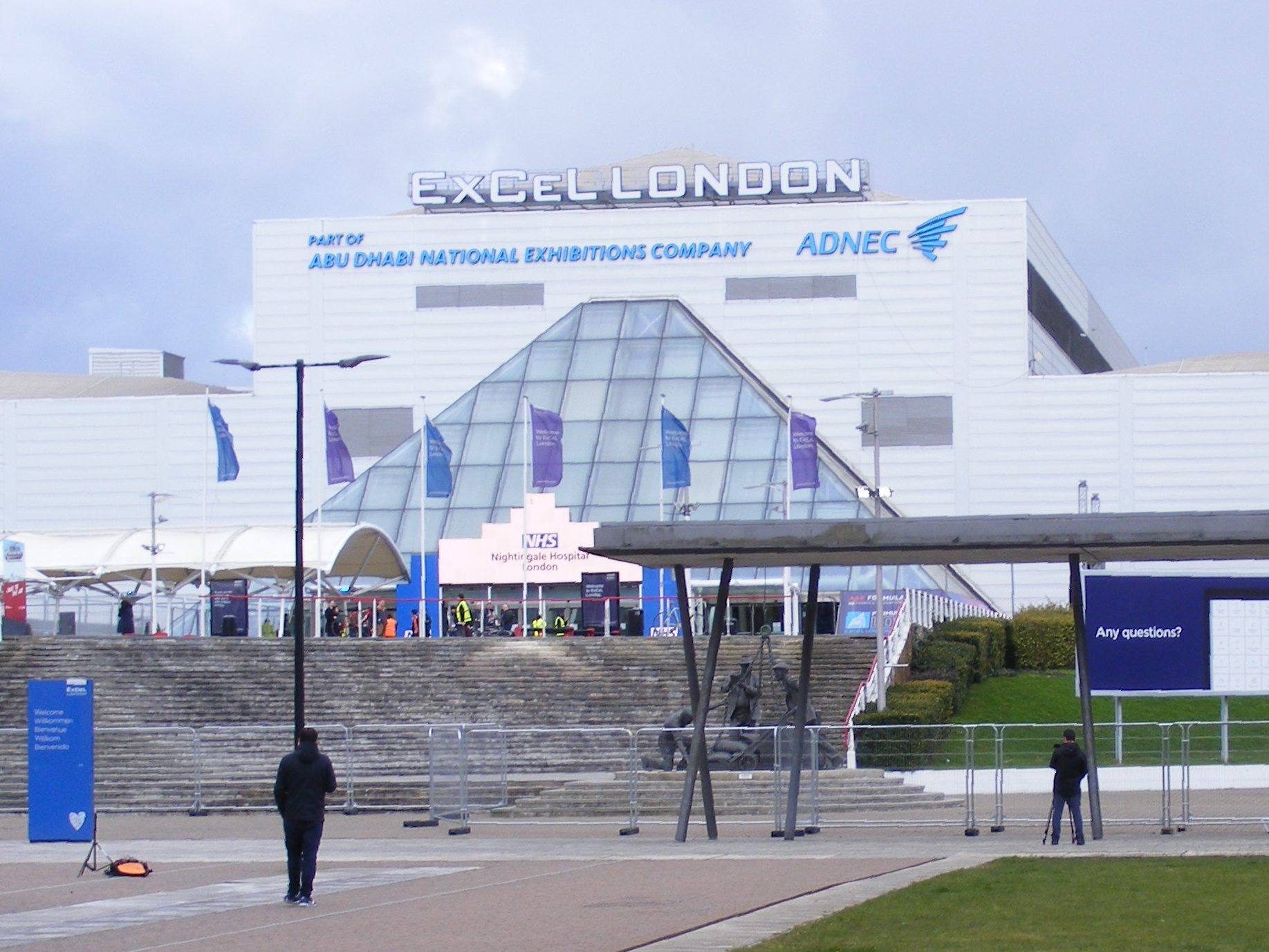
- The main entrance of the hospital during its refit on 30 March 2020

Geography
- Location: Custom House, London, England
- Coordinates: 51°30′29″N 00°01′49″E

Organisation
- Care system: NHS England
- Type: COVID-19 critical care

Services
- Beds: 500 (potential for 4,000)

History
- Opened: 3 April 2020
- Closed: April 2021

Links
- Lists: Hospitals in England

The NHS Nightingale Hospital London was the first of the NHS Nightingale Hospitals, temporary hospitals set up by NHS England for the COVID-19 pandemic. It was housed in the ExCeL London convention centre in East London. The hospital was rapidly planned and constructed, being formally opened on 3 April and receiving its first patients on 7 April 2020. It served 54 patients during the first wave of the pandemic, and was used to serve non-COVID patients and provide vaccinations during the second wave. It was closed in April 2021.

== Background ==
To add extra critical care capacity during the COVID-19 pandemic in the UK, and to treat those with COVID-19, plans were made to create further temporary hospital spaces for those in need of treatment and care. They were named "Nightingale Hospitals", after Florence Nightingale, a nurse who came to prominence during the Crimean War and is regarded as the founder of modern nursing.

== History ==
=== Planning and construction ===
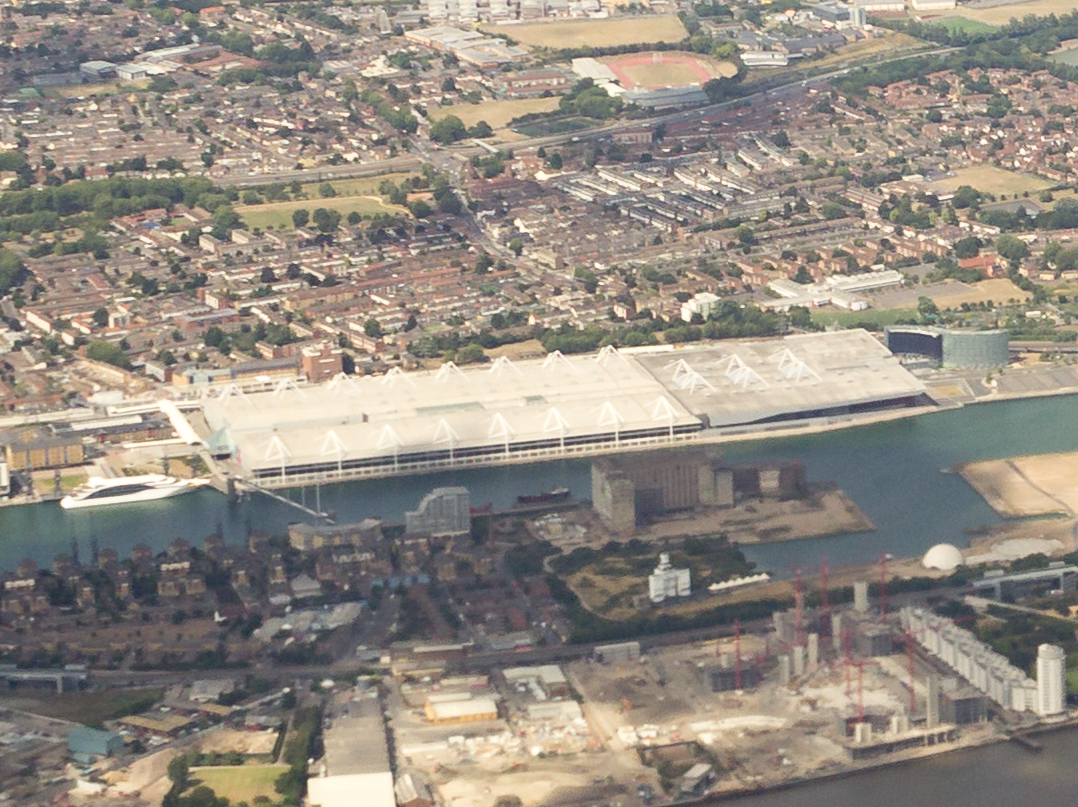
Aerial view of the ExCeL London, the site of the hospital, in 2015

On 21 and 22 March 2020, military planners and NHS England staff visited ExCeL London – an exhibition and convention centre in the Custom House area of Newham, East London – to "determine if the armed forces could support the NHS response to the outbreak". Plans to create the hospital were announced in a press briefing by Health Secretary Matt Hancock on 24 March. The hospital would be run by NHS staff and volunteers, with 700 military personnel providing logistic assistance.

The facility was planned and constructed in conjunction with the British Armed Forces and British architects BDP, with the mission being run from the Headquarters Standing Joint Command in Aldershot, which coordinates resilience missions for the UK. The main contractor was CFES.

The facility was formally opened on 3 April 2020 by the Prince of Wales (via video link) in a ceremony during which the hospital's Head of Nursing unveiled a plaque. The first patients were admitted on 7 April.

The television medical drama Holby City uses operational ventilators on set, and these were donated to the hospital.

=== First wave (March - May 2020) ===
Over the course of the first wave of the COVID pandemic in the United Kingdom, the hospital treated only 54 patients. Preexisting permanent hospitals had successfully managed to increase their intensive care capacity to respond to the growing demands of the pandemic, and as a result the Nightingale Hospital was surplus to requirements.

On 21 April 2020, The Guardian reported that staff at the hospital had claimed that the hospital had been "obliged to reject people needing care because it cannot get enough of the nurses usually based in other hospitals to work there". This allegation was rebutted by a Department of Health and Social Care spokesperson, who stated that no coronavirus patients were being refused treatment due to a shortage of staff as the new hospital was to provide overflow capacity if required.

=== Second wave and vaccinations (January 2021) ===
During the second wave of COVID-19, the hospital reopened for patients recovering from COVID, and patients being treated for non-COVID ailments.

Following the development of the first COVID-19 vaccines, in January 2021 another part of the ExCeL centre was reconfigured to provide COVID vaccinations.

=== Permanent closure ===
In March 2021, it was announced the hospital would permanently close the following month, along with the other Nightingale Hospitals constructed at the beginning of the pandemic.

== Operational details ==
The hospital's role was to treat patients already intubated and ventilated at other London hospitals.

On 30 March 2020 it was announced that legal responsibility for the hospital would be passed to Barts Health NHS Trust, an existing NHS trust, as NHS England does not have legal powers to manage a hospital directly. The hospital's CEO was Charles Knight, seconded from within the Barts trust.

The hospital was designed with capacity to receive and discharge up to 150 patients per day, with the number of staff required at full capacity being reported as 16,000 and later as 25,000.

== Criticism ==
Partially due to its low occupancy and large cost to the taxpayer, the London Nightingale Hospital, along with its counterparts across the country, saw some criticism. Critics argued that the hospitals had been poorly planned, and were little more than a PR stunt. Supporters argued that the hospitals were "insurance" against the possibility of the pandemic completely overwhelming existing hospitals. It has been claimed that one reason that the hospitals saw little use was that existing healthcare centres were reluctant to release staff to work in them, a reflection of a lack of understanding of the structure of the workforce in the healthcare sector.

== See also ==
- NHS Nightingale Hospital Birmingham
- NHS Nightingale Hospital North East
- NHS Nightingale Hospital North West
- NHS Nightingale Hospital Yorkshire and the Humber
- NHS Louisa Jordan – a similar temporary hospital in Glasgow
- Dragon's Heart Hospital – a similar temporary hospital in Cardiff
- Florence Nightingale Field Hospital - a similar temporary hospital in Gibraltar
