= COVID-19 hospitals in the United Kingdom =

Temporary COVID-19 critical care hospitals

Locations of temporary COVID-19 hospitals. A blue marker indicates a network of temporary hospitals and a red marker indicates a single large temporary hospital.

COVID-19 hospitals in the United Kingdom were temporary hospitals set up in the United Kingdom and overseas territories as part of the response to the COVID-19 pandemic.

They principally included the seven NHS England Nightingale Hospitals, NHS Scotland's Louisa Jordan hospital, NHS Wales' Dragon's Heart Hospital, and the Northern Irish Health and Social Care site at Belfast City Hospital, as well as the Florence Nightingale temporary hospital in the Europa Point Sports Complex, Gibraltar.

== Background ==
As the COVID-19 pandemic first took hold in the United Kingdom, its government and the public health services of the home nations started planning the creation of temporary large-scale critical care hospitals to provide cover for the projected increase in patients likely to require this type of treatment. It reflected wider NHS re-structuring to prepare for the COVID-19 pandemic and anticipated strain on NHS services

The initiative was carried out in coordination with the British Armed Forces' COVID Support Force, under the Military Aid to the Civil Authorities provisions, as part of Operation Rescript.

The field hospitals were intended to be used to treat critical care patients regarded as being less severely ill, while the most severely ill patients would be treated in mainstream NHS hospitals.

In the early part of 2020, the hospitals saw relatively few Covid patients, and as case number dropped over the summer they were either mothballed or re-purposed.

On 12 October 2020, amidst a rise in cases in Northern England, the hospitals in Harrogate, Manchester, and Washington were placed on standby in readiness to admit patients with COVID-19.

Very few patients were treated in the Nightingale hospitals, largely due to difficulty finding the necessary additional qualified staff.

== NHS England ==
Locations of NHS Nightingale Hospitals

The NHS Nightingale Hospitals were seven critical care temporary hospitals established by NHS England as part of the response to the COVID-19 pandemic in England. The hospitals were named after Florence Nightingale, who came to prominence for nursing soldiers during the Crimean War and is regarded as the founder of modern nursing.

The NHS Nightingale Hospital London opened first on 3 April 2020, followed by NHS Nightingale Hospital Birmingham on 16 April 2020. As of 5 May 2020, six of the seven planned hospitals had opened, and by the following month all had been placed on standby. The Harrogate and Exeter hospitals were repurposed as diagnostic clinics in June and July respectively.

In the event, almost all of the increased demand for critical care was met by expanding capacity in existing hospitals. By June, all the temporary hospitals had been placed on standby. Only two had admitted patients: 54 were treated at NHS Nightingale Hospital London (all of them in April) and just over 100 at Manchester.

The Tesco supermarket chain planned pop-up branches of its convenience stores in the NHS Nightingale hospitals to provide shopping facilities for hospital staff. It opened the first one in Birmingham Nightingale on 13 April. Technology companies Cisco and BT volunteered to build the hospital's medical-grade computer networks.

In June 2020, the Department of Health and Social Care estimated the combined set-up costs of the hospitals to be £220 million, and stated that running costs for the month of April (for the five which opened during that month) were approximately £15m. By January 2021, the estimated total cost of establishing, running and decommissioning the hospitals was forecast to be £532 million by April 2022.

In November 2020, during the second wave of infections in England, only the Exeter and Manchester hospitals admitted patients. Apart from London and Sunderland which were to remain open as vaccination centres, and Exeter which was to continue to be used for diagnostics, all other Nightingales were scheduled to close by April 2021.

Overall, by August 2021, fewer than 1000 patients were treated in the emergency hospitals.

=== Birmingham ===
On 27 March, chief executive of NHS England Sir Simon Stevens announced a temporary facility providing up to 5,000-beds at Birmingham's National Exhibition Centre would open in mid-April. The hospital became operational on 10 April, with an initial 804 beds followed within 2 weeks by an additional 384 beds. It was officially opened as NHS Nightingale Hospital Birmingham by Prince William, using a video link, on 16 April. The hospital was designed as a 'step down facility', for patients recovering from COVID-19 or those not suitable for ventilation. It was reported a supporting temporary mortuary was being constructed near Birmingham airport.

On 5 May, it was announced that the 1188 bed hospital would be stood down to standby, having admitted no patients.

=== Bristol ===
On 3 April, NHS England announced that a hospital for the Bristol area was to be built in University of the West of England (UWE). The hospital is stated to have a planned capacity of up to 300 beds and is located in the Exhibition and Conference Centre on UWE Bristol's Frenchay campus. Spare student accommodation is also to be made available for doctors and nurses at the Frenchay campus. The hospital was to have space for up to 1,000 beds, if needed.

According to the vice-chancellor of UWE, Steve West, all buildings and car parks required for the hospital have been leased to the NHS for a fee of £1, for as long as is needed.

This hospital was officially opened on 27 April 2020, in a virtual ceremony, by Matt Hancock (health secretary), Prince Edward, Earl of Wessex, and the chief executive of NHS England, Simon Stevens. It has the capacity to care for 60 patients, with the ability to scale up to 300 if required.

=== Cumbria ===
On 1 April 2020, it was reported that leisure centres in Cumbria, including the Whitehaven Sports Centre, the Carlisle Sands Centre, the Penrith Leisure Centre, Kendal Leisure Centre and Furness Academy in Barrow were confirmed field hospital sites. Work started on 1 April and when complete there would be 500 beds.

=== Exeter ===
On 10 April, it was announced that a temporary hospital would be provided in Exeter. The hospital, originally expected to be built in the Westpoint Arena near Clyst St Mary, and provide 200 beds, was due to be ready for use in early May. With the number of COVID-19 cases in the catchment area being lower than first expected, the decision was taken to switch to a smaller site at a former Homebase retail outlet in Sowton. The site was initially leased for nine months, and 116 beds were provided.

From 6 July 2020, the hospital was used for cancer screening, and was open for twelve hours each day. It has also been used for vaccine trials. On 26 November the hospital received its first COVID-19 patients, who were transferred from the Royal Devon and Exeter Hospital as it was "very busy".

=== Harrogate ===
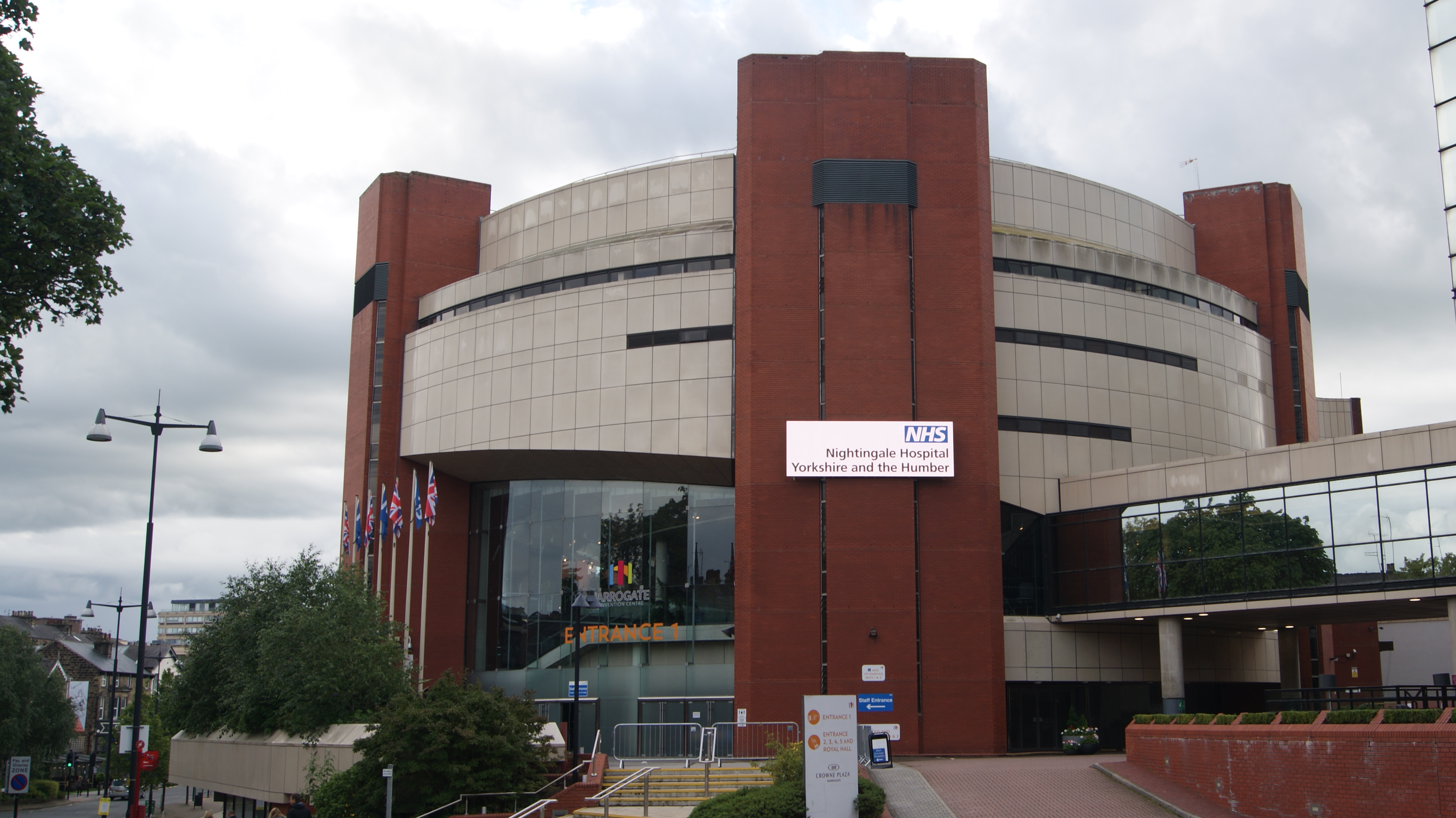
NHS Nightingale Hospital Yorkshire and the Humber

On 3 April, a hospital for Harrogate, Yorkshire was announced by NHS England, with a 500-bed capacity, in the Harrogate Convention Centre. Tom Moore, a 99-year-old army veteran who had raised more £27M to support health service workers, officially opened the hospital on 21 April 2020.

From 4 June the hospital was opened as a radiology outpatient clinic, offering CT scanning.

On 12 October 2020, amidst a rise in cases in Northern England, the hospital was placed on standby to admit COVID-19 patients.

In March 2021, it was confirmed the hospital would close.

=== London ===
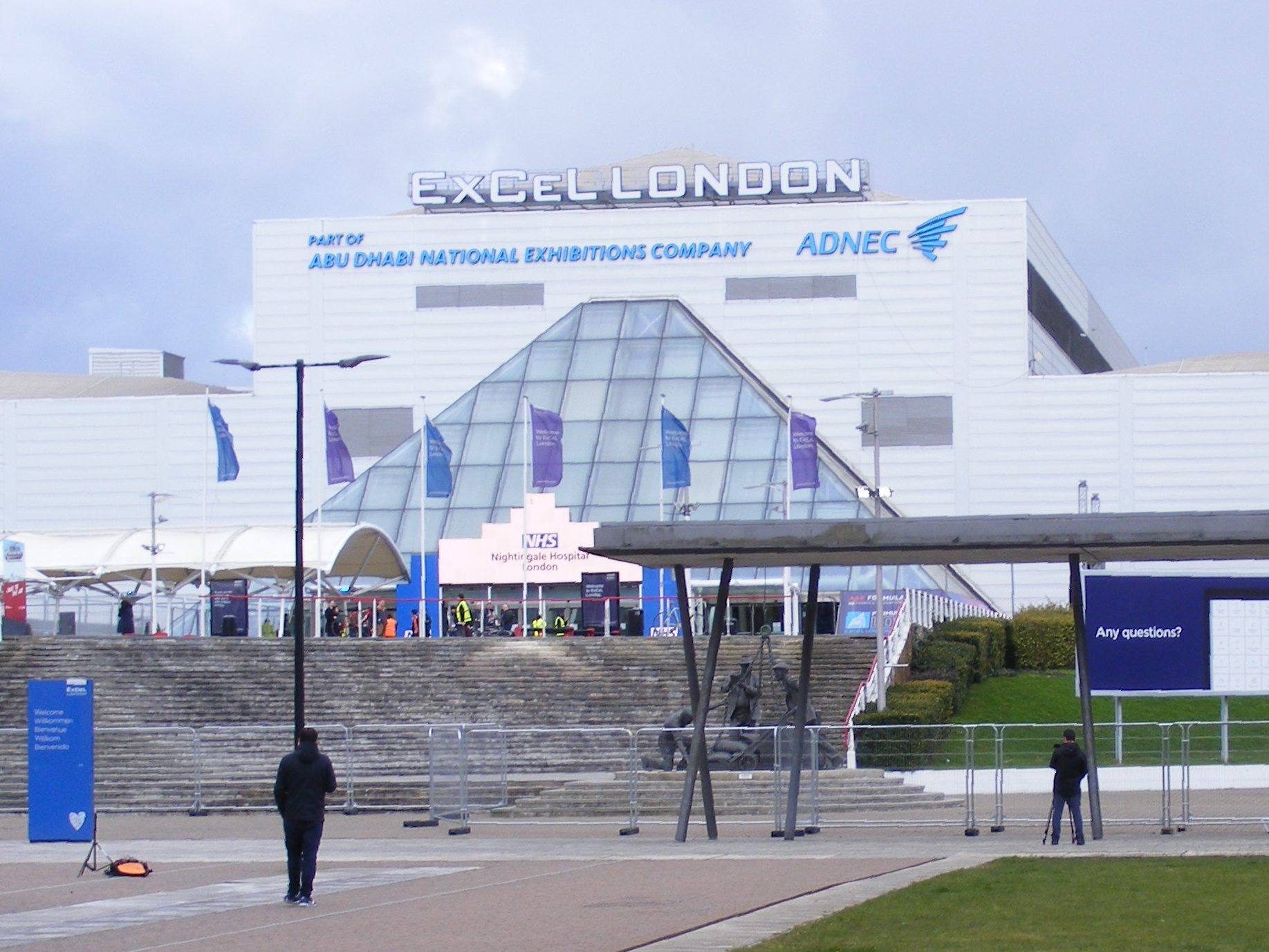
NHS Nightingale Hospital London during its refit on 30 March 2020

On 24 March 2020, the UK Secretary of State for Health and Social Care Matt Hancock, who was responsible for the NHS in England, announced that ExCeL London would be the first field hospital. It was planned to initially have 500 beds, with the capacity for 4,000–5,000 beds across its two wards if necessary later.

It was reported a large mortuary was also being constructed on Wanstead Flats, a few miles to the north of the hospital. It was also reported that the hospital would be the largest critical care unit in the world.

Also on 3 April, the London hospital became the first to enter service when it was officially opened by Prince Charles by videolink.

On 4 May 2020, it was announced that the hospital would be stood down to standby, and would not admit any new patients.

Events which were to take place at ExCeL London were postponed, cancelled or moved online. An example of the latter was the American Society of Mechanical Engineers Turbo Expo 2020 conference, planned for 22–26 June.

=== Manchester ===
On 27 March, Simon Stevens also announced that a 1,000-bed hospital was to be provided in the Manchester Central Convention Complex, also due to open in mid-April.

The hospital was ready to receive patients on Easter Sunday, 13 April 2020. The official opening, by Camilla, Duchess of Cornwall in a recorded speech, took place on 17 April 2020.

On 12 October 2020, amidst a rise in cases in Northern England, the hospital was placed on standby to admit COVID-19 patients.

=== Sunderland ===
On 10 April, it was announced that a 460-bed facility would be built in Washington, Tyne and Wear. The hospital, at the Centre of Excellence for Sustainable Advanced Manufacturing, was expected to be ready for use within two weeks and be operated by Newcastle upon Tyne Hospitals NHS Foundation Trust.

The hospital was officially opened on 5 May 2020, in a virtual ceremony, by Matt Hancock (Secretary of State for Health). The opening ceremony also featured television celebrities Ant and Dec, football pundit Alan Shearer and cricketer Ben Stokes.

On 12 October 2020, amidst a rise in cases in Northern England, the hospital was placed on standby to admit COVID-19 patients.

== NHS Scotland ==
As of April 2020, the SEC Centre in Glasgow was converted to the NHS Louisa Jordan, a temporary hospital serving Scotland. Scotland's First Minister Nicola Sturgeon said the facility would have a 300-bed capacity but with the potential to raise it beyond 1,000 beds. The facility was named NHS Louisa Jordan after the World War I nurse Louisa Jordan.

== NHS Wales ==
Locations of temporary coronavirus hospitals in Wales

=== Cardiff ===
On 27 March 2020, Cardiff and Vale University Health Board CEO Len Richards announced that the Principality Stadium would be turned into a temporary hospital with 2,000 beds. It was to be the third largest hospital in the United Kingdom, after the Nightingale Hospital at the Excel Centre London and the Nightingale Hospital at Birmingham's National Exhibition Centre.

On 8 April its name was given as the Dragon's Heart Hospital (Welsh: Ysbyty Calon y Ddraig) and it was announced that the first 300 beds would be available on 11 April.

After the last patient left the hospital on 4 June, it was reported that the hospital was placed on a standby status. In September it was reported that the hospital is to be replaced by a smaller facility nearby, next to the University Hospital of Wales, Cardiff.

=== Regional temporary hospitals ===
In addition, work has begun to provide 340 bed spaces at Llandarcy Academy of Sport in Neath and 150 beds at a council facility in Ty Trevithick in Abercynon, while Parc y Scarlets in Llanelli is to be used to provide 500 beds, with Rodney Parade in Newport being turned into a testing station. In northern Wales, Venue Cymru in Llandudno was prepared to receive 350 beds, Deeside Leisure Centre in Flintshire to have 250 beds, with an extra 80 beds at Glan Clwyd Hospital in Bodelwyddan, Denbighshire, while Bangor University was to be prepared to receive 250 beds.

The Bluestone National Park Resort in Pembrokeshire is to be used as a recovery centre for COVID-19 patients.

=== The Bay Field Hospital, Swansea ===
In April 2020, Bay Studios on the site of the former Swansea Bay Motor Factory located on the outskirts of Swansea City Centre was announced by Swansea Council to be the chosen site for a 1,000-bed hospital. Within 1 month 420 beds and 80 discharge seats were made available, and the facility was handed over to the Swansea Bay University Health Board on 10 May 2020. Swansea Council funded the Swansea Bay Hospital injecting £50 million of available funds in to the project which was set aside for the new indoor arena which is currently being built in the City Centre.

=== Rationalisation, autumn 2020 ===
During the earlier part of 2020, a total of 19 'field hospitals' were constructed across Wales (one source gives '17 and 2 community discharge units'). These included conversions of existing health facilities as well as purpose-built hospitals and conversions of stadia and other leisure facilities. In September 2020, it was announced that these would be rationalised down to a total of 10 such special facilities.

== HSC Northern Ireland ==
HSC Northern Ireland started planning for a similar initiative in mid-March 2020, with a number of sites under consideration.

HSC Northern Ireland is also using the "Nightingale" name for its hospitals.

On 2 April it was reported that the tower block of Belfast City Hospital was being converted into the first Nightingale in Northern Ireland. The block was to become a 230-bed unit staffed by a team drawn from across Northern Ireland.

The same report also stated that First Minister Arlene Foster had revealed that a Nightingale hospital could be based at the Eikon Exhibition Centre in Balmoral Park, and that the Department of Health was assessing its potential as a second Nightingale facility in preparation for a possible second wave later in 2020.

== Gibraltar Health Authority (GHA) ==
A "Nightingale" field hospital was completed in Gibraltar at the Europa Point Sports Complex, during the week of 3 April 2020. In May it was described as being about to be progressively mothballed, with its equipment to be kept stored and the facility to be available for use at 5–7 days' notice.

== Jersey ==
A "Nightingale" field hospital was completed as a 'wing' of Jersey General Hospital (on a playing field 3 kilometres (1.9 mi) away) and opened on 11 May 2020.

== Staffing ==
At full capacity, it was estimated that the NHS Nightingale Hospital London alone would need up to 16,000 workers to keep it running.

Nursing leaders expressed concern about where the extra workers to staff the new hospitals would be found. The government issued a call for airline cabin crew to volunteer to be cross-trained as specialist health assistants.

== List of actual and planned hospitals ==
List of NHS COVID-19 field hospitals
Authority	Hospital	Site location	Max. Capacity	Official announcement	(planned), Opened/ first patients	'Standby', Autumn 2020	Ref
NHS England	NHS Nightingale Hospital London	ExCeL London, England	4,000–5,000	24 March 2020	3 April / 7 April 'Mothballed' 4 May Closed 15 May		
NHS England	NHS Nightingale Hospital Birmingham	National Exhibition Centre, Birmingham, England	496 (initial); 800 (phase 1); 2,000 (phase 2); 4,000 beds (worst-case scenario).	27 March 2020	10 April 2020/ N/A		
NHS England	NHS Nightingale Hospital North West	Manchester Central Convention Complex, Manchester, England	1,000	27 March 2020	13 April 2020/ 'late June, Standby'	12 October 2020	
NHS England	NHS Nightingale Hospital Bristol	UWE Bristol Exhibition and Conference Centre, Bristol, England	1,000	3 April 2020	27 April/ N/A	'Dormant' 8 October	
NHS England	NHS Nightingale Hospital Yorkshire and the Humber	Harrogate Convention Centre, North Yorkshire, England	500	3 April 2020	21 April/ 4 June (radiology outpatients)	12 October 2020	
NHS England	NHS Nightingale Hospital NE	Centre of Excellence for Sustainable Advanced Manufacturing, Washington, City of Sunderland, Tyne and Wear, England	460	10 April 2020	5 May 2020/	12 October 2020	
NHS England	NHS Nightingale Hospital Exeter	Former Homebase store, Sowton Industrial Estate, Exeter, England	116	10 April 2020	('late May')/ 6 July 2020 (diagnostic screening)	[Partly] repurposed 5 October; taking Covid patients (December)	
NHS England	Cumbria field hospitals	Leisure centres in Whitehaven, Carlisle, Penrith, Kendal, and Furness Academy in Barrow, England	500	1 April 2020			
HSC Northern Ireland	HSC Nightingale Hospital Belfast	Belfast City Hospital Tower Block, Belfast, Northern Ireland	230	2 April 2020	/stood down May 2020	14 October 2020; taking Covid patients (December)	
NHS Scotland	NHS Louisa Jordan	SEC Centre, Glasgow, Scotland	1,000	30 March 2020	19 April ready, 30 April official opening/	4 August 'stay open' over winter	
NHS Wales	Dragon's Heart Hospital (Ysbyty Calon y Ddraig)	Principality Stadium, Cardiff, Wales	2,000	27 March 2020	13 April/ 28 April	September: 'To be moved'	
NHS Wales	New facility	next to the University Hospital of Wales, Cardiff.		September 2020		September: 'To replace Dragons Heart'	
NHS Wales	Rainbow Hospital (Ysbyty Enfys)	Venue Cymru, Llandudno, Wales	350	2 April 2020	by 5 May 2020/	29 Sept: beds to be on standby	
NHS Wales	Hywel Dda Health Board field hospitals	Parc y Scarlets, Llanelli, Wales	500	27 March 2020		29 Sept: beds to be on standby, some at Selwyn Samuel Centre, Llanelli	
NHS Wales	Hywel Dda Health Board field hospitals	Bluestone National Park	144	2 April 2020		29 Sept: beds to be on standby	
NHS Wales	Betsi Cadwaladr Health Board field hospitals- Rainbow Hospitals (Ysbytai Enfys)	Venue Cymru, Llandudno	350	2 April 2020	by 5 May 2020/	29 Sept: beds to be on standby	
NHS Wales	Betsi Cadwaladr Health Board field hospitals- Rainbow Hospitals (Ysbytai Enfys)	Brailsford Centre, Bangor University	250	2 April 2020	by 5 May 2020/	29 Sept: beds to be on standby	
NHS Wales	Betsi Cadwaladr Health Board field hospitals- Rainbow Hospitals (Ysbytai Enfys)	Ysbyty Enfys Deeside, Deeside Leisure Centre	250	2 April 2020	by 5 May 2020/	29 Sept: beds to be on standby	
NHS Wales	Betsi Cadwaladr Health Board field hospitals- Rainbow Hospitals (Ysbytai Enfys)	Glan Clwyd Hospital, Bodelwyddan	80	2 April 2020			
NHS Wales	Cwm Taf Morgannwg Health Board field hospitals	Welsh Rugby Union centres in Hensol and Abercynon, Wales, amongst others	900	2 April 2020		29 Sept: Harman Becker unit, Bridgend Industrial Estate on standby	
NHS Wales	Swansea Bay University Health Board field hospitals	Bay Studios, Fabian Way, Swansea, Wales	1,000	2 April 2020	7 May 2020/	Expanded September 2020	
NHS Wales	Swansea Bay University Health Board field hospitals	Llandarcy Academy of Sport, Llandarcy, Neath Port Talbot, Wales	340	2 April 2020	Beds transferred to Bay Studios Sept. '20	Closed returned to former use	
Gibraltar Health Authority	Florence Nightingale Field Hospital, Gibraltar	Europa Point, Gibraltar	300	Completed 'in under 3 weeks'	Opened Week of 3 April/	16 May running down but available at 5 days' notice	
Jersey Health & Community Services department	"Nightingale" field hospital, Jersey	A 'wing' of Jersey General Hospital, St Helier (3 km from the main part)	180	Announced 9 April	Opened 11 May	14 August: lease to run to 31 March 2021	

== See also ==
- Fangcang hospital
- COVID-19 hospital
