= NHS Nightingale Hospital North West =

Temporary NHS COVID-19 hospital set up in Manchester Central

- Manchester University NHS Foundation Trust
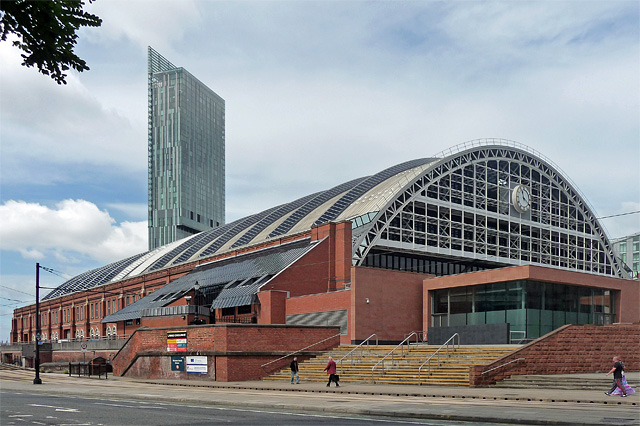
- Manchester Central Convention Complex before its conversion into NHS Nightingale North West

Geography
- Location: Manchester Central
- Coordinates: 53.476°N 2.247°W

Organisation
- Care system: NHS England
- Type: COVID-19 critical care

Services
- Beds: up to 1,000

History
- Opened: 13 April 2020
- Closed: March 2021

The NHS Nightingale Hospital North West was the third of the temporary NHS Nightingale Hospitals set up by NHS England in 2020 to help to deal with the COVID-19 pandemic. It was closed in March 2021.

== Building ==
The hospital was constructed inside the Manchester Central Convention Complex and opened on 13 April 2020.

== Patients ==
As of 4 May, a small number of patients had been treated at the hospital. Despite patient numbers remaining far below capacity, the hospital was not placed on standby like other Nightingale temporary hospitals in England, instead serving as a step-down facility for rehabilitation rather than an intensive care unit for patients requiring mechanical ventilation.

Two patients are known to have died at the hospital as of 26 May.

By late June, the hospital had been placed on standby and was reported to have treated just over 100 patients in total.

On 28 October 2020 amidst a rise in cases in Northern England, the hospital was reopened with 750 beds for patients from the region's hospitals without Coronavirus to free-up beds in those hospitals.

== See also ==
- Dragon's Heart Hospital, Cardiff
- NHS Louisa Jordan, Glasgow
- NHS Nightingale Hospital Birmingham
- NHS Nightingale Hospital London
- NHS Nightingale Hospital Yorkshire and the Humber, Harrogate
