= NHS Nightingale Hospital Birmingham =

Temporary NHS COVID-19 hospital set up in NEC Birmingham

- University Hospitals Birmingham NHS Foundation Trust
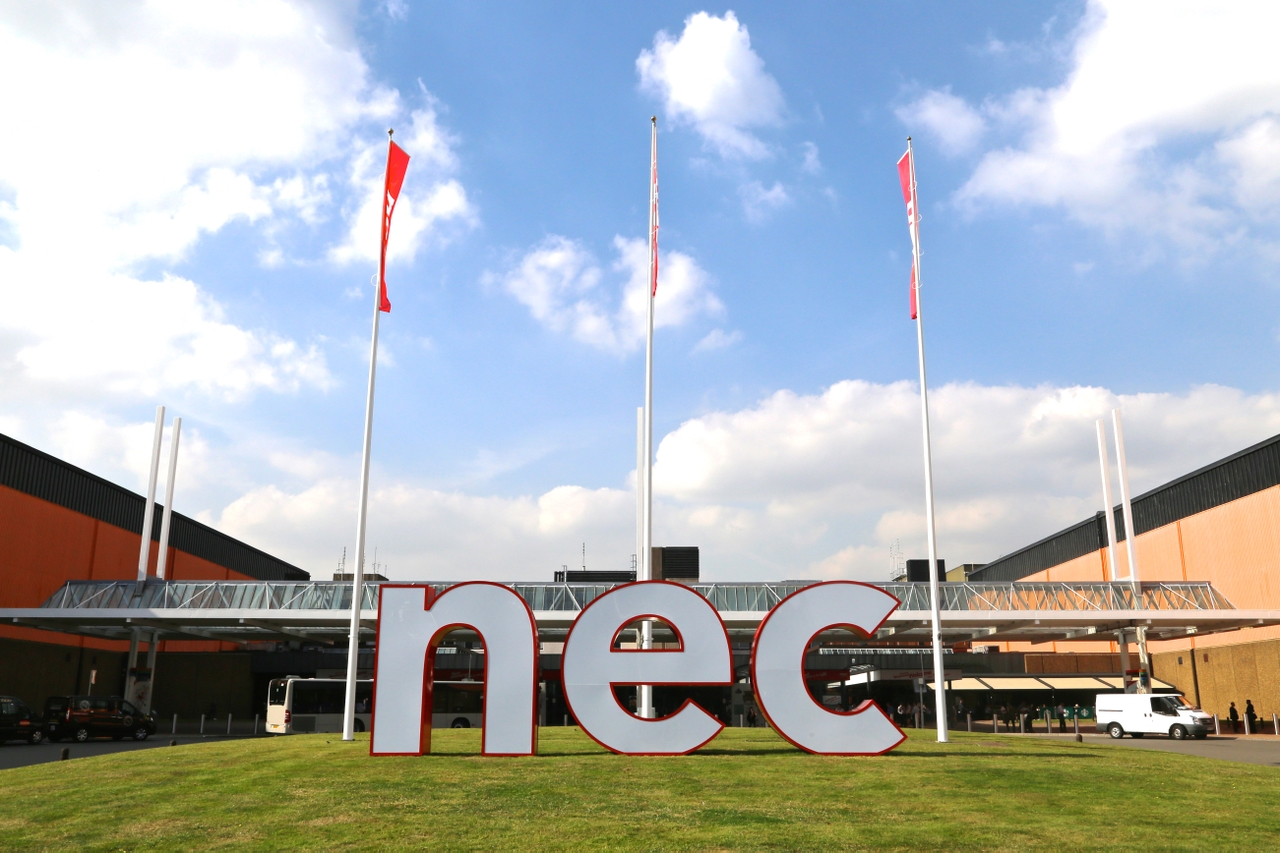
- View of the National Exhibition Centre, the site of the hospital, in 2015

Geography
- Location: National Exhibition Centre; Solihull; B40 1NT, West Midlands
- Coordinates: 52°27′12″N 1°43′10″W

Organisation
- Care system: NHS England
- Type: COVID-19 critical care

Services
- Beds: 496 (phase 1 on day 1); 800 (phase 1 if needed); 2,000 (phase 2 if needed); 4,000 beds (potential)

Helipads
- Helipad: Birmingham Airport

History
- Opened: 16 April 2020
- Closed: 1 April 2021

Links
- Website: nightingale-birmingham.nhs.uk

The NHS Nightingale Hospital Birmingham was the second of the temporary NHS Nightingale Hospitals set up by NHS England to help to deal with the COVID-19 pandemic. It was constructed inside the National Exhibition Centre, Solihull, and opened on 16 April 2020. It cost £66.4 million to set up and was the most expensive of all the Nightingale temporary hospitals. On 1 April 2021 the hospital closed without ever treating a patient.

== Background ==
To add extra critical care capacity during the COVID-19 epidemic in the UK, and to treat those with COVID-19, plans were made to create further temporary hospital spaces for those in need of treatment and care. They have been named "Nightingale Hospitals", after Florence Nightingale who came to prominence for nursing soldiers during the Crimean War and is regarded as the founder of modern nursing.

== Details ==
The hospital was constructed in 8 days by 400 civilian personnel, 500 clinical staff and military personnel to a cost of £66.4 million. It was announced as operational on 10 April 2020, and was initially scheduled to receive its first patients on 12 April. It was formally opened by Prince William, Duke of Cambridge, via remote video link, on 16 April.

It was intended to support 23 Midlands hospitals by taking patients who were convalescing from having COVID-19, patients who are required less intensive treatment, and patients who needed palliative care. In doing this it would have relieved pressure on conventional hospitals where the most seriously ill patients were treated. The hospital fell under the University Hospitals Birmingham NHS Foundation Trust.

It was the second temporary 'Nightingale Hospital' to be built in England, following NHS Nightingale London, that opened on 3 April 2020 in the ExCeL London exhibition and convention centre.

The hospital occupied halls 8–12 and 16 of the NEC, connected via the Atrium. It had 496 beds divided into four wards from day one, with the option to expand to 800 immediately if needed. A plan for a second phase was envisaged that would have brought the number of beds in use up to 2,000, however this was never necessary. In the worst-case scenario 4,000 beds would have been available.

It included a new Tesco store exclusively for the use of its staff.

The hospital never treated any patients due to existing hospitals being able to absorb the increased demand. It closed on 1 April 2021, less than a year after opening.

== Personnel ==
The following were involved in the creation of the hospital:

- Paul Thandi (CEO of the NEC Group).
- Anthony Marsh (West Midlands Ambulance Service Chief Executive).
- Major Angela Laycock (66 Works Group, 170 Infrastructure Support Engineer Group, Royal Engineers).
- Dr David Rosser (Chief Executive, University Hospitals Birmingham).
- Lisa Stalley-Green (Executive Chief Nurse, University Hospitals Birmingham and Chief Nurse of NHS Nightingale Birmingham).
- Morag Gates (Project Director, NHS Nightingale Birmingham).

== See also ==
- Dragon's Heart Hospital, Cardiff
- NHS Louisa Jordan, Glasgow
- NHS Nightingale Hospital London
- NHS Nightingale Hospital North West, Manchester
- NHS Nightingale Hospital Yorkshire and the Humber, Harrogate
