= NHS Louisa Jordan =

Emergency critical care hospital created in 2020 to deal with the COVID-19 pandemic

- NHS Scotland
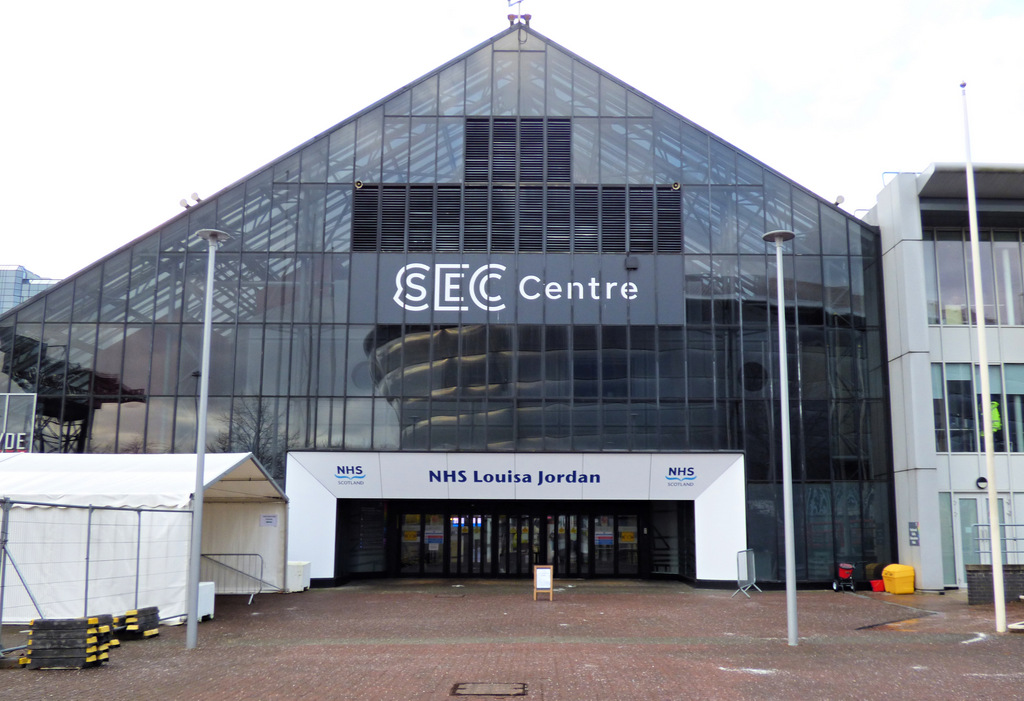
- Facade of the SEC Centre with NHS Louisa Jordan branding in January 2021

Geography
- Location: Exhibition Way; Glasgow; G3 8YW; Scotland
- Coordinates: 55.86085°N 4.28812°W

Organisation
- Care system: NHS Scotland
- Type: COVID-19 critical care

Services
- Beds: 300 initially, up to 1000 as needed

History
- Opened: 19 April 2020
- Closed: 31 March 2021

The NHS Louisa Jordan was a temporary emergency critical care hospital created to deal with the COVID-19 pandemic in Scotland. It was located within the SEC Centre in Glasgow.

== History ==
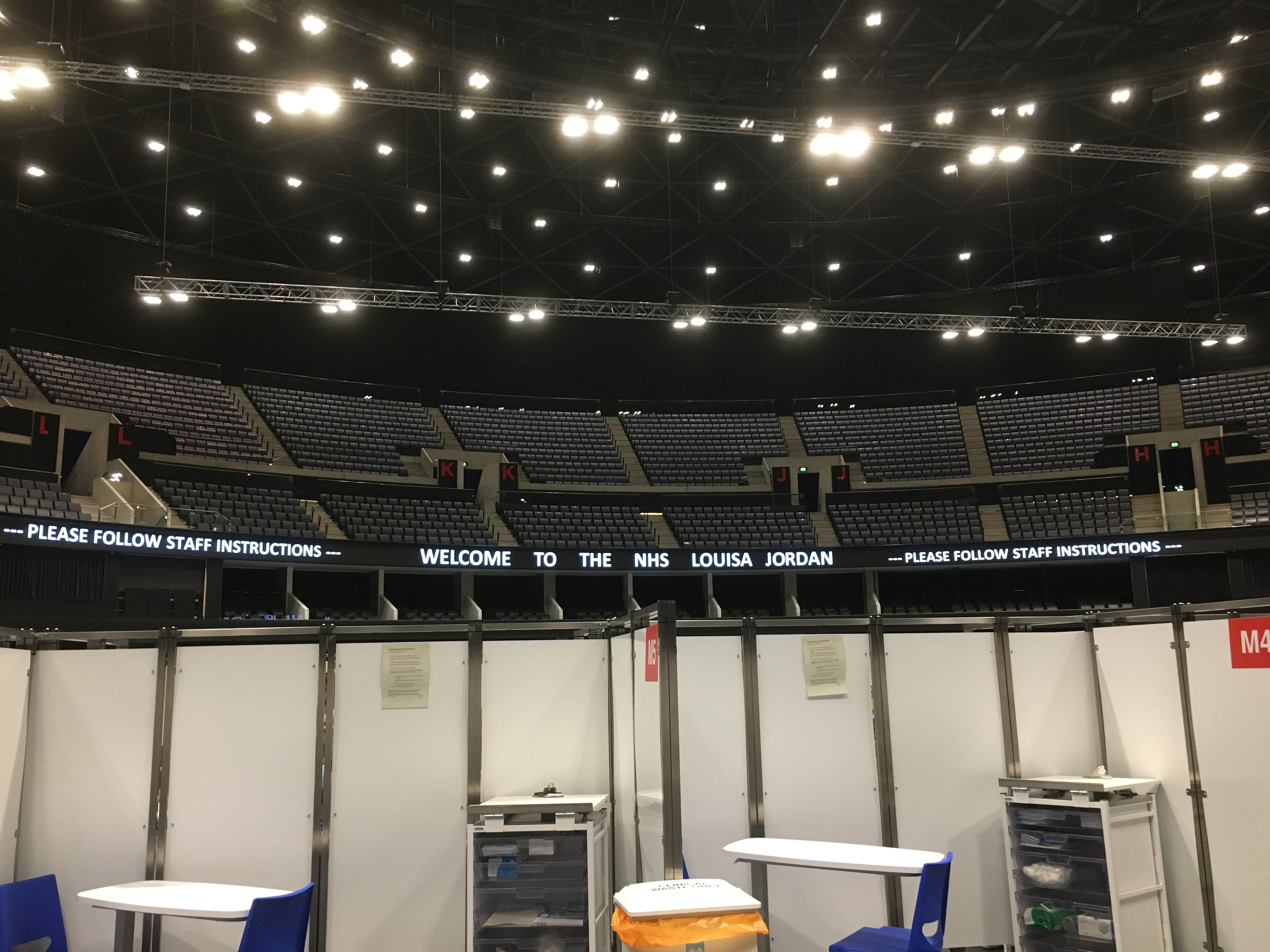
Interior of the Hydro, as used as a vaccination clinic in May 2021

Operated by NHS Scotland, it was planned to have an initial capacity of 300 beds, and the capability of expanding to accommodate 1000. It became operationally ready on 19 April 2020, and was officially opened via video by Princess Anne on 30 April 2020.

The hospital was partially repurposed to allow other activities to take place; in August 2020 it was announced that the hospital would be kept open throughout the winter. It was being used as a training hub, along with holding orthopaedic and plastic surgery outpatient consultations. NHS Louisa Jordan hosted COVID-19 vaccine clinics from 8 December 2020.

The hospital's last day of operation was 31 March 2021 and its mass vaccination clinic relocated to the OVO Hydro. The last day of the vaccination clinic was 18 July 2021.

== Naming ==
The facility was named after Scottish nurse Louisa Jordan, who died in service during the First World War in the Serbian typhus epidemic.

Jordan's family members were grateful for the naming of the hospital. Her great nephew Murray Crone stated: "The members of our family have been very touched by the dedication, as we have been familiar with her story for many years. It is so pleasing that she would be chosen now as a representative of all the volunteers in the Scottish Women's Hospital during WW1, coping with a Typhus epidemic in Serbia. And, of course, also representing all the present day medical workers doing their utmost at this time, fighting against Covid-19."

Former Labour MP Douglas Alexander criticised the SNP-led Scottish Government over the naming of the facility, as it did not use the NHS Nightingale Hospitals naming convention which, at the time of completion, had been used by NHS England to refer to COVID-19 relief in England. NHS Wales similarly decided not to use the Nightingale convention and later adopted the name Dragon's Heart Hospital for its primary COVID-19 field hospital following a public consultation.

== See also ==
- Dragon's Heart Hospital, Cardiff
- NHS Nightingale Hospital Birmingham
- NHS Nightingale Hospital London
- NHS Nightingale Hospital North West, Manchester
- NHS Nightingale Hospital Yorkshire and the Humber, Harrogate
