= Dragon's Heart Hospital =

2020 temporary hospital in Cardiff, Wales

Dragon's Heart Hospital Ysbyty Calon y Ddraig
- Cardiff and Vale University Health Board
- Dragon's Heart Hospital on the playing field of the Principality Stadium

Geography
- Location: Millennium Stadium (Principality Stadium for sponsorship reasons), Cardiff, Wales
- Coordinates: 51°28′41″N 3°10′57″W

Organisation
- Care system: NHS Wales
- Type: Temporary COVID-19 hospital

Services
- Beds: 300 (2,000 maximum)

History
- Opened: 13 April 2020
- Closed: 8 June 2020

Links
- Website: www.wales.nhs.uk/news/52401

Dragon's Heart Hospital (Welsh: Ysbyty Calon y Ddraig) was a temporary hospital located at the Millennium Stadium in Cardiff. It opened on 13 April 2020 to help deal with the impact of the COVID-19 pandemic in Wales. It was decommissioned towards the end of October and early November 2020.

It was the third of the COVID-19 hospitals set up in the United Kingdom, and the first in Wales. It had 300 beds, with space to expand to up to 2,000, which would make it the largest hospital in Wales, and the second largest in the United Kingdom.

== Background ==
Chief Executive of Cardiff and Vale UHB Len Richards confirmed that the health board had carried out modelling and predictions of patient number scenarios, aided by research from Imperial College, London. As a result of that research, they felt it necessary to expand capacity in the Cardiff and Vale of Glamorgan area through a large field hospital. The Millennium Stadium was established as an early candidate for the field hospital as the UK's fourth largest stadium and the largest in Wales, and the site was designed and made operational in under two weeks in March. The project required 5,000 planning hours, 650 contractors and 30 members of the armed forces.

The project involved £8m in capital spending from Welsh Government, and involvement from Cardiff Council, Cardiff and Vale University Health Board, the Welsh Rugby Union (WRU), the Millennium Stadium, and NHS Wales. However it was stated that where capacity was available, the facility would have been open to patients from other health boards across Wales.

== Details ==
The first 330-bed spaces were completed on 11 April, and handed over by the Main Contractor, ES Global Ltd, to the client, Cardiff and Vale University Health Board.

It opened for service on 13 April 2020. Facilities available include mobile X-ray and CT scanners, and the stadium has opened both the playing surface and directors boxes for use as treatment space. The home and away dressing rooms were repurposed to serve as office spaces. A police cell in the under-course of the stadium had also been made available. Cardiff Arms Park was being utilised as part of the Dragon's Heart Hospital and had seen flooring laid upon the artificial turf. The site had end-of-life pathway care for those facing a critical prognosis. NHS Wales chief executive Dr Andrew Goodall stated that the hospital, combined with other regional field hospitals in Wales, would serve to double the service's bed capacity and increase the number by around 6,000.

The primary focus was on patients coming to the end of their illness and those recovering to return home, allowing more capacity to become available within intensive care wards elsewhere for critical patients. However, there would also be patients on palliative care plans located at the site. The WRU worked with the Vale Resort in Hensol to make a further 255 patient space available at its training ground site in the Vale of Glamorgan, to open on 27 April. That site included eight wards and food supplied from the adjacent hotel. The Hensol Castle Distillery provided hand sanitiser on that site.

== Naming ==
The hospital was named following a public consultation, with the eventual name chosen by staff and the public from 2,000 responses. It was formally opened on 20 April by Charles, Prince of Wales, via a pre-recorded video message.

== Resources ==
WalesOnline report that once operational, the hospital would provide 20,000 porter visits daily to different parts of the hospital, producing three-and-a-half tons of clinical waste, and consume hundreds of thousands of litres of oxygen. In July 2020, the hospital Board report assessed costs at £67.830M (including compensation costs for the WRU and Cardiff Blues of £1.687M) with a further £2.822M capital costs. Decommissioning including reinstatement of the stadium would take 4 months and cost £9.730M.

== Staffing ==
It was intended that around 2,500 staff would be employed when the site was at full capacity, to include 100 doctors, 500 nurses, radiographers, physiotherapists, occupational therapists, volunteers, porters, catering staff, health care assistants and those returning from retirement to the profession. Wales rugby international Jamie Roberts, a qualified doctor, was involved in the opening.

== Operation ==
The first patient was admitted to the hospital on 28 April 2020. The hospital had 46 patients at its busiest, but by 4 June, it had no remaining patients and on 8 June Cardiff and Vale University Health Board announced that it would be "put on standby". Although most staff were redeployed elsewhere, the Health Board indicated that the Principality Stadium would remain out of use for sport indefinitely.

== Closure ==
In September it was reported that the hospital was to be replaced by a smaller facility nearby, next to the University Hospital of Wales, Cardiff. In November 2020, Cardiff and Vale University Health Board (UHB) formally left Dragon's Heart Hospital. Recommissioning the stadium for sporting use began the same month.

== See also ==
- COVID-19 hospitals in the United Kingdom – UK hospital and field hospital provision during the coronavirus outbreak
- Cardiff and Vale University Health Board – the local health board responsible for the Dragon's Heart site
- NHS Nightingale Hospitals – similar temporary hospitals in England
- NHS Louisa Jordan Hospital – a similar temporary hospital in Glasgow
