= Military aid to the civil authorities =

Deployment of the UK armed forces

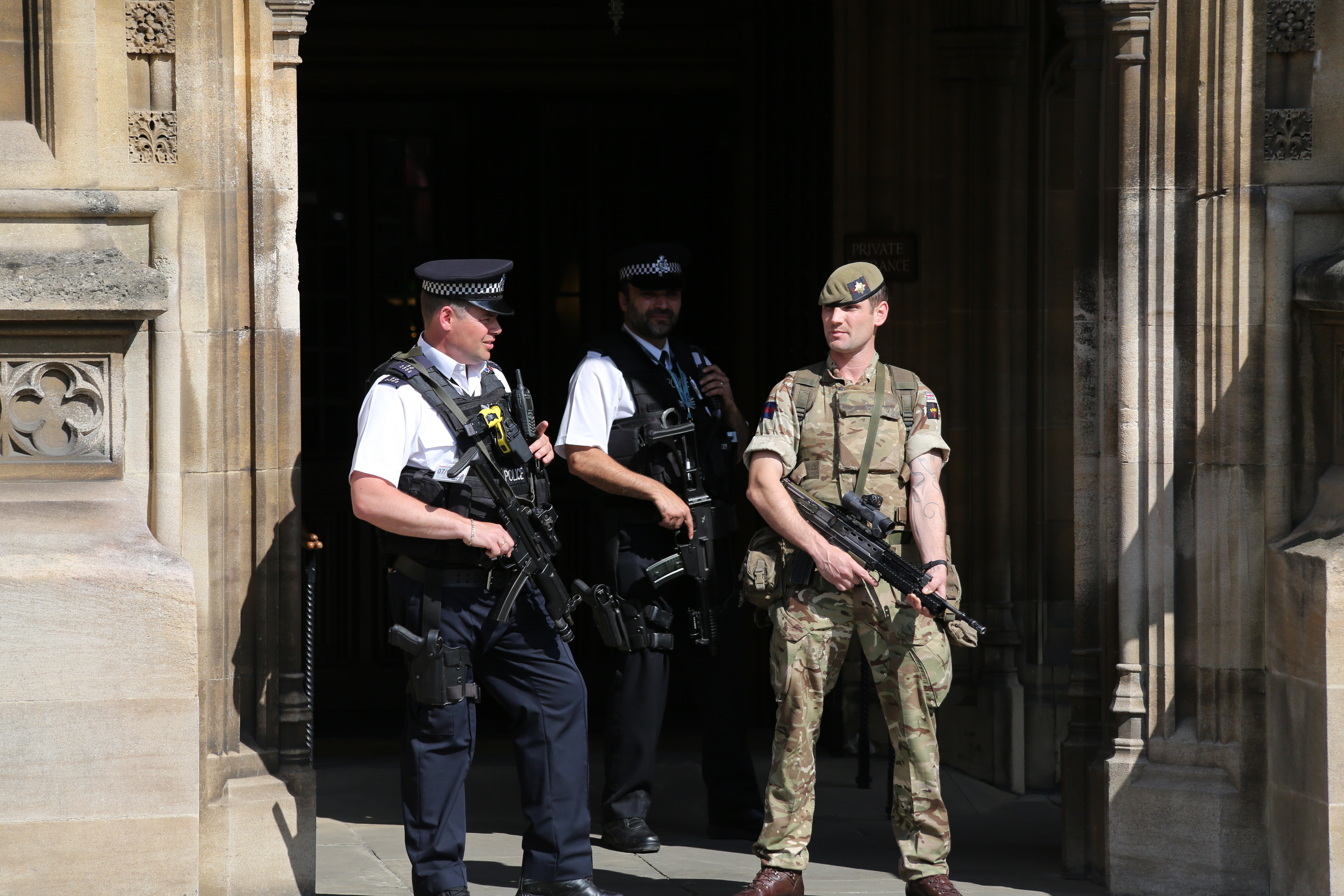
British soldier alongside armed police guarding the Palace of Westminster as part of Operation Temperer, May 2017

Military aid to the civil authorities (MACA) is the collective term used by the Ministry of Defence of the Government of the United Kingdom to refer to the operational deployment of the armed forces of the United Kingdom in support of the civilian authorities, other government departments and the community as a whole. Commander Home Command, in his capacity as Standing Joint Commander (UK) is the standing joint commander responsible for the planning and execution of civil contingency operations within the UK landmass and territorial waters during any military aid to UK civil authorities.

== Scope ==
There are three criteria for the provision of MACA:

- Military aid should always be the last resort. The use of mutual aid, other agencies, and the private sector must be otherwise considered as insufficient or be unsuitable.
- The civil authority lacks the required level of capability to fulfil the task and it is unreasonable or prohibitively expensive to expect it to develop one.
- The civil authority has a capability, but the need to act is urgent and it lacks readily available resources.

=== Legal considerations ===
All operations must be conducted within both civil and military law. Failure to comply with this principle may result in criminal or civil law proceedings being brought against individuals or the MOD. Unlike the police and some other civil agencies, members of the Armed Forces (during peacetime) have no powers over and above those of ordinary citizens. They have the same personal duty as anyone else to abide by the law at all times.

The Armed Forces are not a categorised responder for the purposes of the Civil Contingencies Act 2004 and thus do not assume the relevant legal duties.

== Types of assistance ==
MACA encompasses four types of assistance:

- Military aid to other government departments
- Military aid to the civil power
- Military aid to the civil community
- Training and logistic assistance to the civil power

=== Military aid to other government departments ===
Military aid to other government departments covers assistance provided by the armed forces to urgent work of national importance or in maintaining supplies and services essential to the life, health and safety of the community, such as Operation Fresco during the 2002-2003 UK firefighter dispute. MAGD is controlled under orders made under section 2 of the Emergency Powers Act 1964.

=== Military aid to the civil power ===
Military aid to the civil power encompasses the provision of military assistance (armed if necessary) in its maintenance of law, order and public safety using specialist capabilities or equipment in situations beyond the capability of the civil power. This includes capabilities such as explosive ordnance disposal and mountain rescue (where it is provided by the Royal Air Force Mountain Rescue Service)

=== Military aid to the civil community ===
Military aid to the civil community encompasses the provision of unarmed military assistance to prevent or deal with the aftermath of a natural disaster or a major incident or, to assist civil sponsors either by carrying out special projects of significant social value to the community or by attaching individual volunteers to specific projects.

== History ==
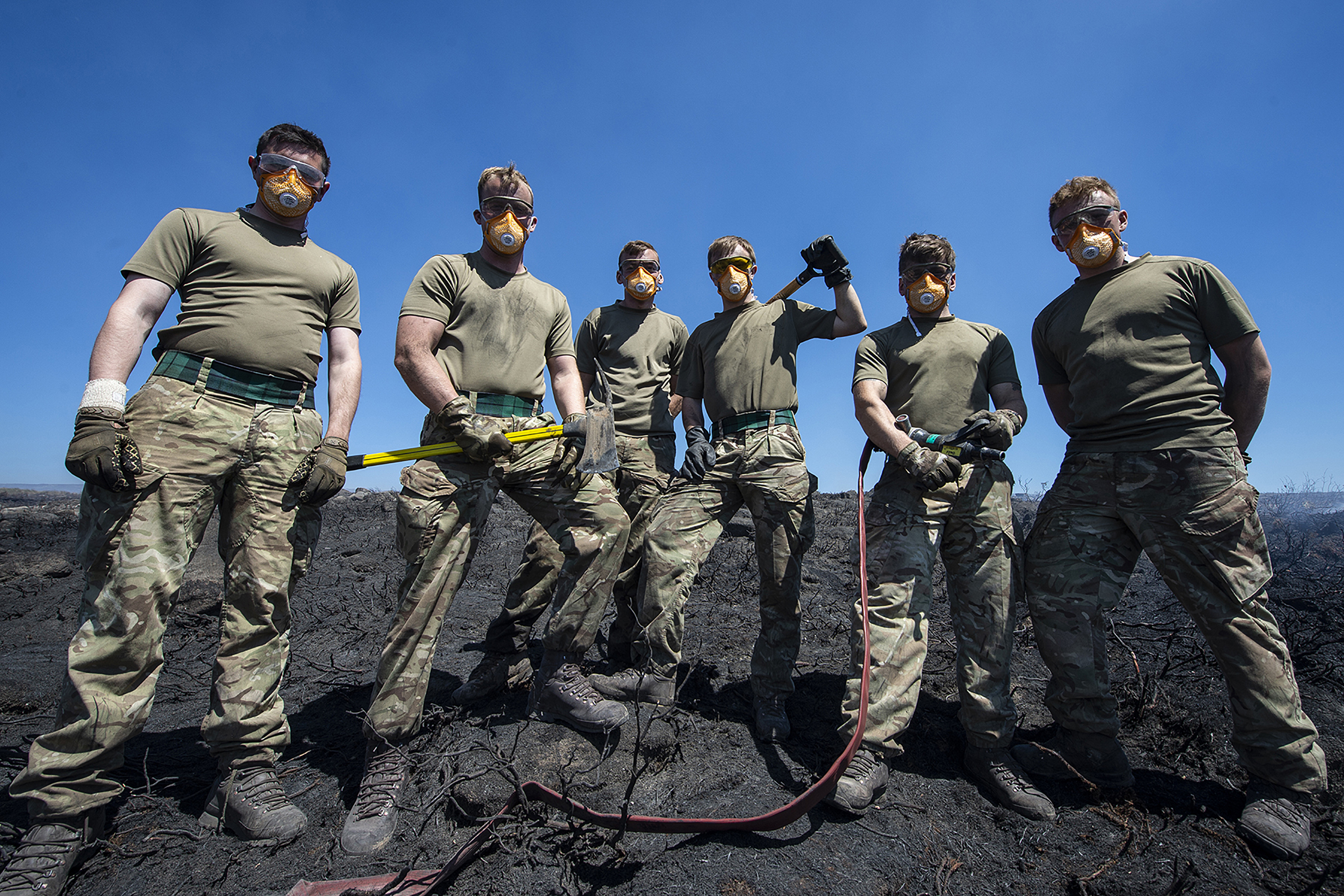
Soldiers from the Royal Regiment of Scotland providing assistance to firefighters during the 2018 United Kingdom wildfires

Examples of MACA being utilized include:

- Operation Fresco during the 2002-2003 UK firefighter dispute
- Operation Pitchpole during the 2013–14 United Kingdom winter floods
- Operation Shaku during the 2015–16 Great Britain and Ireland floods
- Operation Bridled following the collapse of Didcot power station in 2016.
- Operation Temperer following the Manchester Arena bombing and the Parsons Green train bombing in 2017
- 2018 United Kingdom wildfires
- 2019–20 United Kingdom floods
- Operation Rescript during the COVID-19 pandemic in the United Kingdom
- Storm Arwen in December 2021
- Operation Isotrope (2020-2023) in response to the English Channel migrant crossings (2018–present)
- Following an armed Metropolitan Police officer being charged with murder after shooting Chris Kaba, over 100 members of the firearms unit surrendered their licences. The Home Office accordingly requested that the Ministry of Defence be prepared to provide armed support if required. Ultimately, no need to support the police arose.

== See also ==
- Iranian Embassy siege
- Winter of Discontent
