= Emergency Powers Act =

Emergency Powers Act may refer to:

== United Kingdom ==
- Emergency Powers Act 1920
- Emergency Powers Act (Northern Ireland) 1926, amended in 1964
- Emergency Powers (Defence) Act 1939
- Emergency Powers (Defence) Act 1940
- Emergency Powers Act 1964

== Ireland ==
- Emergency Powers Act 1939

== See also ==
- Emergencies Act, in Canada, 1988
