= Lockdown =

Emergency protocol that prevents people from leaving or entering a location

A lockdown (/ˈlɒkˌdaʊn/) is a restriction policy for people, community or a country to stay where they are, usually due to specific risks that could possibly harm the people if they move and interact freely.

The term is used for a prison protocol that usually prevents people, information or objects from leaving an area. The protocol can usually only be initiated by someone in a position of authority.

A lockdown can also be used to protect people inside a facility or, for example, a computing system, from a threat or other external event. In buildings doors leading outside are usually locked so that no person may enter or exit.

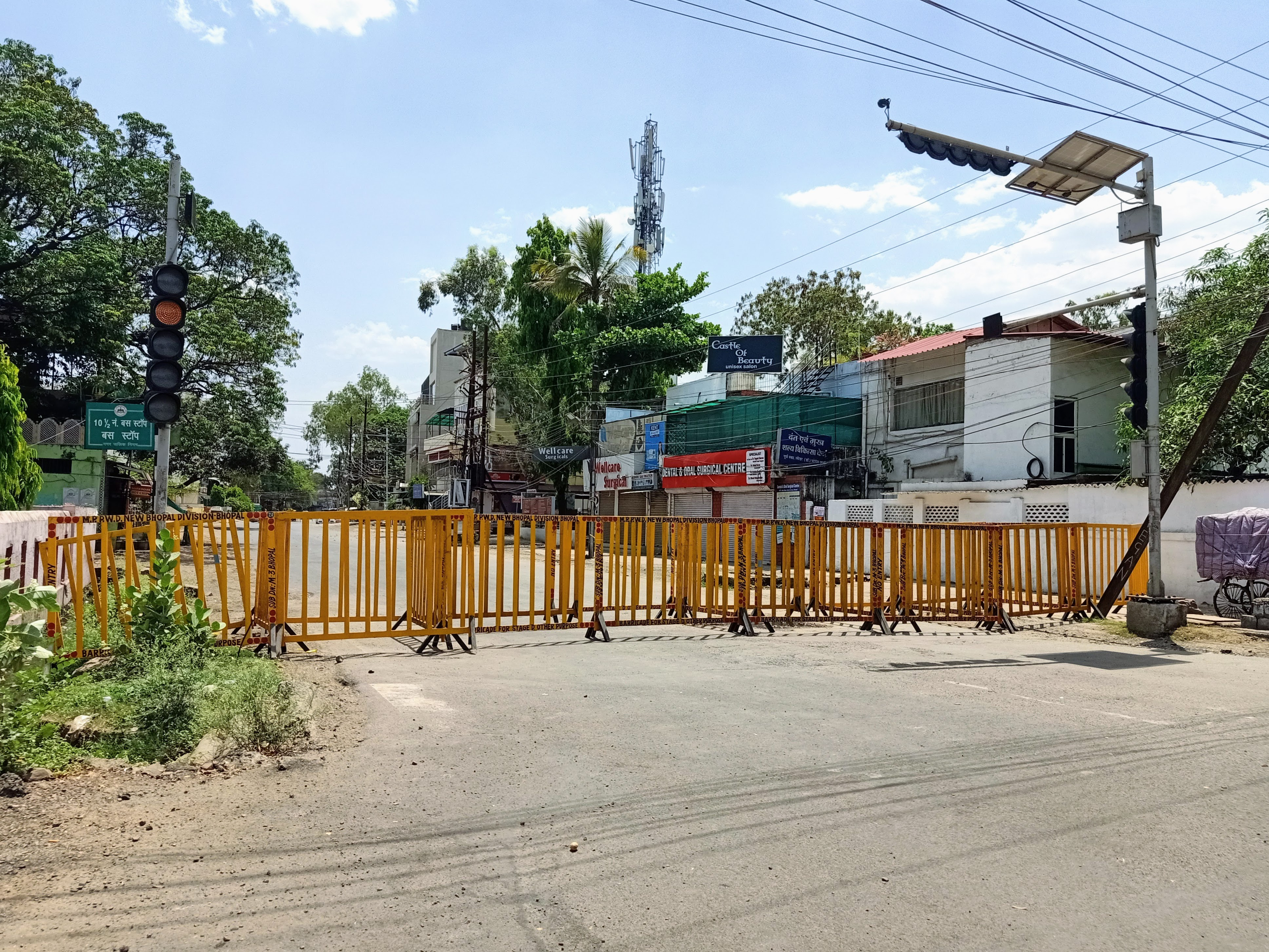
Street barricades that were set up due to an outbreak of COVID-19 in Bhopal, Madhya Pradesh, India

== Types ==
Lockdowns may be adopted as a preventative measure or in response to a crisis as an emergency measure.

=== Preventive lockdown ===
A preventive lockdown is a preemptive action plan implemented to address an unusual scenario or a weakness in system to preempt any danger to ensure the safety and security of people, organisation and system. The focus for preventive actions is to avoid dangers and risks arising from the nonconformity to the normal circumstances, but also commonly includes improvements in efficiency.

Preventive lockdowns are preemptive lockdowns to mitigate risk. Most organisations plan for the emergency lockdowns but fail to plan for other situations that might quickly degrade to dangerous levels. These protocols must be based on the type of threat, and should be kept simple and short for quick learning and implementation, and flexible enough to handle several scenarios. This allows administrators more options to choose from which are easier to use in various scenarios. For example, in case of a loud scene by a parent or an unarmed petty thief being chased by the police through the school playground, this flexible procedure allows school administrators the flexibility to implement a more limited lockdown while teaching in school continues, thus eliminating need for complete emergency lockdown, disruption and delays in resumption of teaching, etc. The consequences of not having procedures to implement such lockdowns is that the situation might quickly escalate where there could be loss of human lives.

=== Emergency lockdown ===
Emergency lockdowns are implemented when there is imminent threat to the lives or risk of injury to humans, for example, a school's emergency lockdown procedures must be kept short and simple to make them easier to use under real life crisis conditions. Simple procedures can be easily taught with periodic lockdown drills instead of lengthy training.

=== Purposes ===
Both preventative and emergency lockdowns can be adopted for similar goals. They may be use for security purposes to reduce the number of people on the street to allow police to conduct rescue missions after natural disasters. They may be used in public health emergencies, such as Ebola and COVID-19, to prevent air-borne diseases from spreading and they may be used as counterinsurgency measures to prevent local populations mixing with insurgents so that governments can conduct military missions against the insurgents. They may also be used in police emergencies, as in school shootings or hostage situations.

=== In epidemics and pandemics ===
Lockdowns can limit movements or activities in a community while allowing most organizations to function normally, or limit movements or activities such that only organizations supplying basic needs and services can function normally.

==== 2009 swine flu pandemic ====
A lockdown was implemented in Mexico from 30 April to 5 May 2009 in response to the 2009 swine flu pandemic.

==== COVID-19 pandemic ====
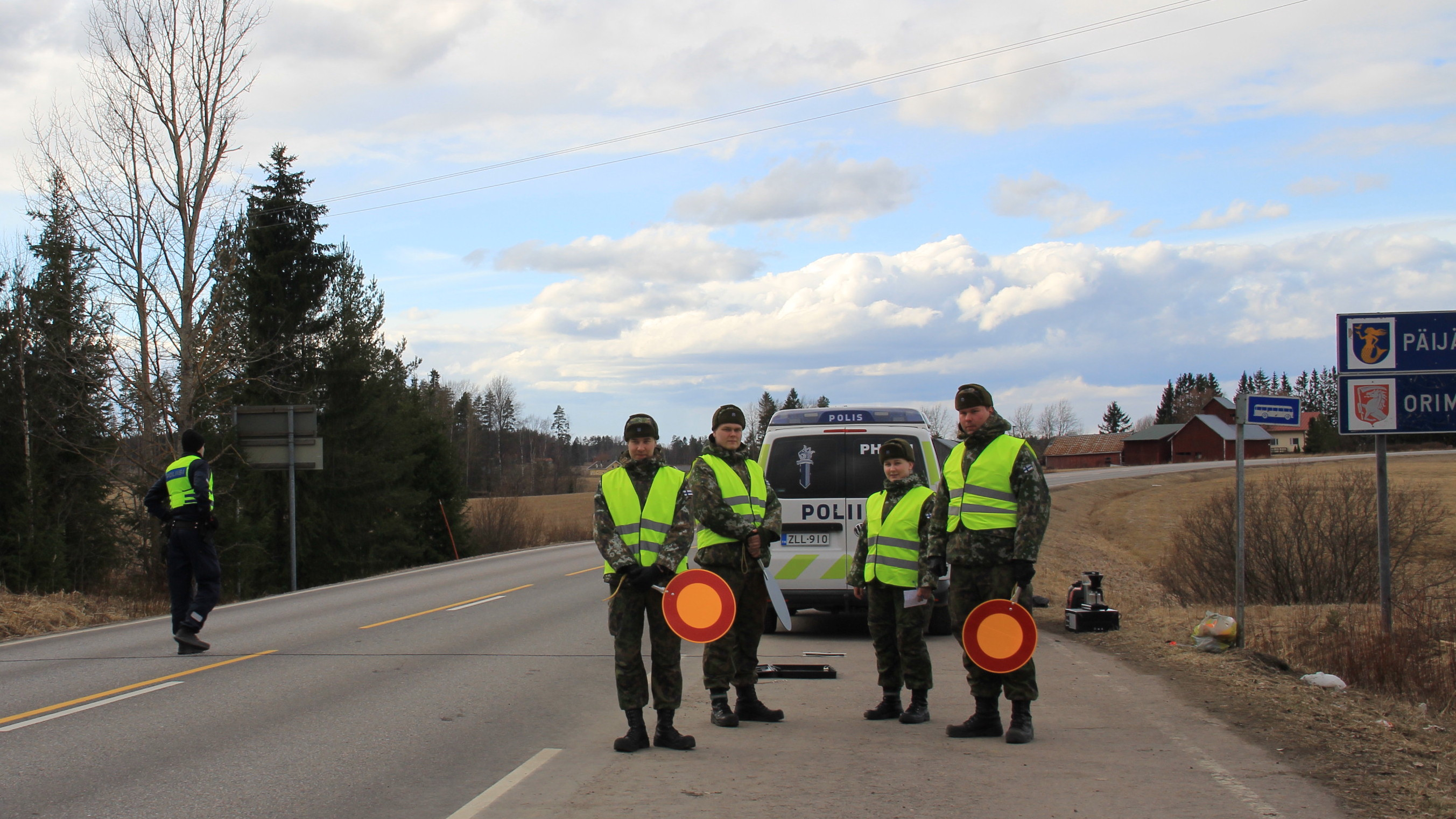
In March 2020, the entire Uusimaa region was temporarily isolated from the rest of Finland by government decision due to increased COVID-19 infections. Picture of the checkpoint at the Myrskylä and Orimattila border.

During the COVID-19 pandemic, the term lockdown was used for actions related to mass quarantines or stay-at-home orders. The first lockdown during the pandemic was implemented in Wuhan on 23 January 2020. By early April 2020, 3.9 billion people worldwide were under some form of lockdown—more than half the world's population. By late April, around 300 million people were under lockdown in European countries, while around 200 million people were under lockdown in Latin America. Nearly 300 million people, or about 90 per cent of the population, were under some form of lockdown in the United States, and 1.3 billion people have been under lockdown in India.

The lockdown in the Philippines started on 14 March 2020 and is one of the longest and strictest lockdowns with varying levels of community quarantine being imposed on all major islands and cities. Similarly, the lockdown in South Africa started on 27 March 2020 and progressed through various levels. It is also one of the strictest lockdowns in the world with cigarettes and alcohol banned throughout.

== Typical scenarios ==
=== Schools ===
Lockdown procedures vary by site and country. Generally, a lockdown means that interior and exterior doors are locked, and all students and staff must remain in their location from the time the lockdown is announced. In some locations, windows are covered, and students stand at the back of the classroom or away from windows.

Since the Columbine shooting in 1999 and the 11 September 2001 attacks, lockdown procedures in schools have been changing. Some schools direct teachers to continue with standard procedures while remaining quiet, while some recommend an active approach against threats.

=== Prisons ===
In prisons, the term lockdown can be defined as a course of action to control the movement of inmates. Confining all prisoners, except workers, to their cells until the end of the day is an example of a "lockdown period" in a corrections schedule. However a "full lockdown" is used when all prisoners are locked in their cells to prevent prison riots or unrest from spreading or during an emergency.

=== Hospitals ===
In US guidelines, occasions for preventing entry into a hospital may include: power failure, earthquake, flooding, fire, bomb threat, hostage crisis and active shooter. Occasions for preventing both entry and exit from a hospital may include: external contamination, civil disturbance and abduction of an infant or child.

=== Lean manufacturing process ===
In manufacturing, the term lockdown event refers to a continuous improvement initiative in which manufacturing in a specific area (typically a cell or specific piece of machinery) is halted in order to contain, and determine, what are the issues that are preventing the manufacture of goods from meeting quality specifications. During the lockdown event a multi-disciplinary team reviews the specific area's manufacturing processes, tooling and machine condition, to find the root cause(s) of the problem(s). Once changes to the process, or machine repairs that may include adjustments or replacement are effected, a sample run is initiated and evaluated. If the results of the validation are within the required specifications, the area lockdown is lifted and production is resumed. Follow-up sampling is conducted subsequently to ensure continuity of the lockdown results.

== Newsworthy lockdowns ==
In the wake of the September 11 attacks (2001), a three-day lockdown of American civilian airspace was initiated.

At the University of British Columbia (UBC) on 30 January 2008, an unknown threat was made, and the Royal Canadian Mounted Police (RCMP) issued a lockdown order on one of the buildings on campus for six hours, cordoning off the area. A campus alert was sent via email to everyone affiliated with UBC, while those in the building remained locked in it.

On 10 April 2008, two Canadian secondary schools were locked down due to suspected firearm threats. George S. Henry Academy was locked down in Toronto, Ontario at approximately 2:00 p.m. The ETF were contacted and the lockdown lasted for more than two hours. New Westminster Secondary School was locked down in New Westminster, British Columbia at approximately 1:40 p.m. The Emergency Response Team (ERT) was called, and the school was under lockdown until 4:30 p.m. Due to the size of the school some students were not able to leave until 7:00 p.m.

On 19 April 2013, the entire city of Boston, US was locked down and all public transportation stopped during the manhunt for terrorists Dzhokhar and Tamerlan Tsarnaev, the perpetrators of the Boston Marathon bombing, while the town of Watertown was under heavily armed police and SWAT surveillance, and systematic house-to-house searches were carried out.

In Belgium, its capital Brussels was locked down in 2015 for days while security services sought suspects involved with the November 2015 Paris attacks. Later in 2015, a terror threat caused the 2015 Los Angeles Unified School District closure.

In August 2019, the Indian government imposed a lockdown on Jammu and Kashmir after the revocation of the special status of the state, by communications and media blackout, claiming that the lockdown was to curb terrorism.

According to Merriam-Webster, the first known use of lockdown occurred in 1973, referring to the confinement of prisoners.

Tracking usage changes through events reported up to 1999 in The New York Times:

12 Feb 1974, Violent Inmates Are Isolated at San Quentin contains the first reference to lockdown.

29 Jul 1998, Children in Tow, Tourists Stream to Capitol to Mourn Its Guardians, By Lizette Alvarez: "Friday's act by a gunman prompted few calls for a lockdown of the Capitol."

25 Oct 1998, Report Card in Yonkers On New Schools Chief, By Elsa Brenner: "Dr. Hornsby declared a lockdown in the city's high schools, informing 6,000 students that they could no longer ventue off campus for pizzas and Chinese food."

8 Nov 1998, No More Rotten Odors, Sewage Protesters Say, By David Koeppel: "At Seaford Harbor School, Principal Barbara Bauer, who attended the rally, acknowledged that the smells had resulted in one 'lockdown' in the past year. On Oct. 26, parents say, a lockdown was declared at another school, Mandalay elementary."

10 Feb 1999, As Senate Goes Into Lockdown, Quiet Fills Capitol, By Frances X. Clines: "the Senate went into lockdown with President Clinton's fate in its hands."

6 Jun 1999, In Brief: School Hot Line: "there has also been 'a massive security lockdown' at all Yonkers schools. ...All but one entrance door in each school is locked, and safety officers are stationed at each. Everyone entering school buildings is being scanned for weapons."

13 Aug 1999, Schools in New York Area Reassess Safety for Students, By Randal C. Archibold: "The shootings at Columbine High School in Littleton, Colo., have led school officials in the New York City metropolitan area to reassess security and in some cases to make changes to minimize threats. At one extreme is West Hartford, Conn., where administrators devised what they termed a 'lockdown' drill in which students and teachers, practicing in case there should be a shooting, lock all doors and stay put until they are told that the police have arrived."

== See also ==
- Amber alert – US based child abduction emergency alert system
- Code Adam – Missing-child safety program
- Curfew – Order imposing rules at specified hours
- Martial law – Imposition of direct military control or suspension of civil law by a government
