= 2020 Uusimaa lockdown =

COVID-19 control measure in Finland

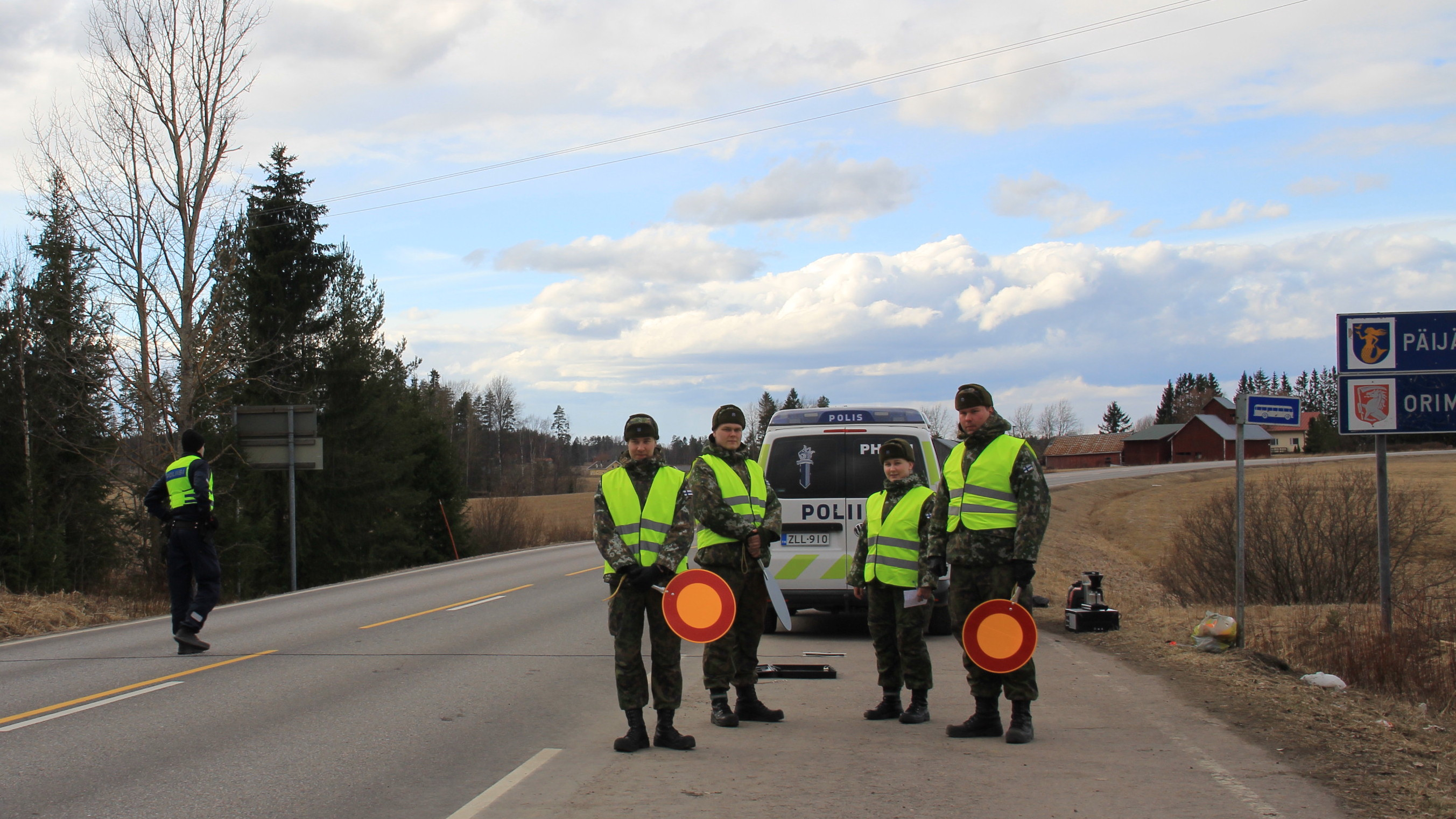
The checkpoints were supervised by the Finnish police, and traffic was controlled by conscripts doing voluntary military service. The checkpoint in the photo was located on regional road 167 on the border of Myrskylä (in Uusimaa) and Orimattila (in Päijät-Häme).

The Uusimaa lockdown (Uudenmaan sulku) refers to the restriction of movement between the Uusimaa region and the rest of Finland that was in force from 28 March to 15 April 2020. After the restrictions came into effect, residents of Uusimaa had to remain within the region. Residents of other regions could not visit Uusimaa. The aim of the lockdown was to slow the spread of COVID-19 pandemic.

== Decision and wording ==
The lockdown was based on Section 118 of the Emergency Powers Act. According to it, the Finnish Government may, by decision, "temporarily, for a maximum of three months at a time, prohibit or restrict the right to reside and move in a certain locality or area, if this is necessary to prevent a serious danger to the life or health of people." On March 26, 2020, the incidence rate in Uusimaa was twice that of the rest of the country. The then Prime Minister Sanna Marin emphasized that the restrictions were necessary to protect the life and health of people.

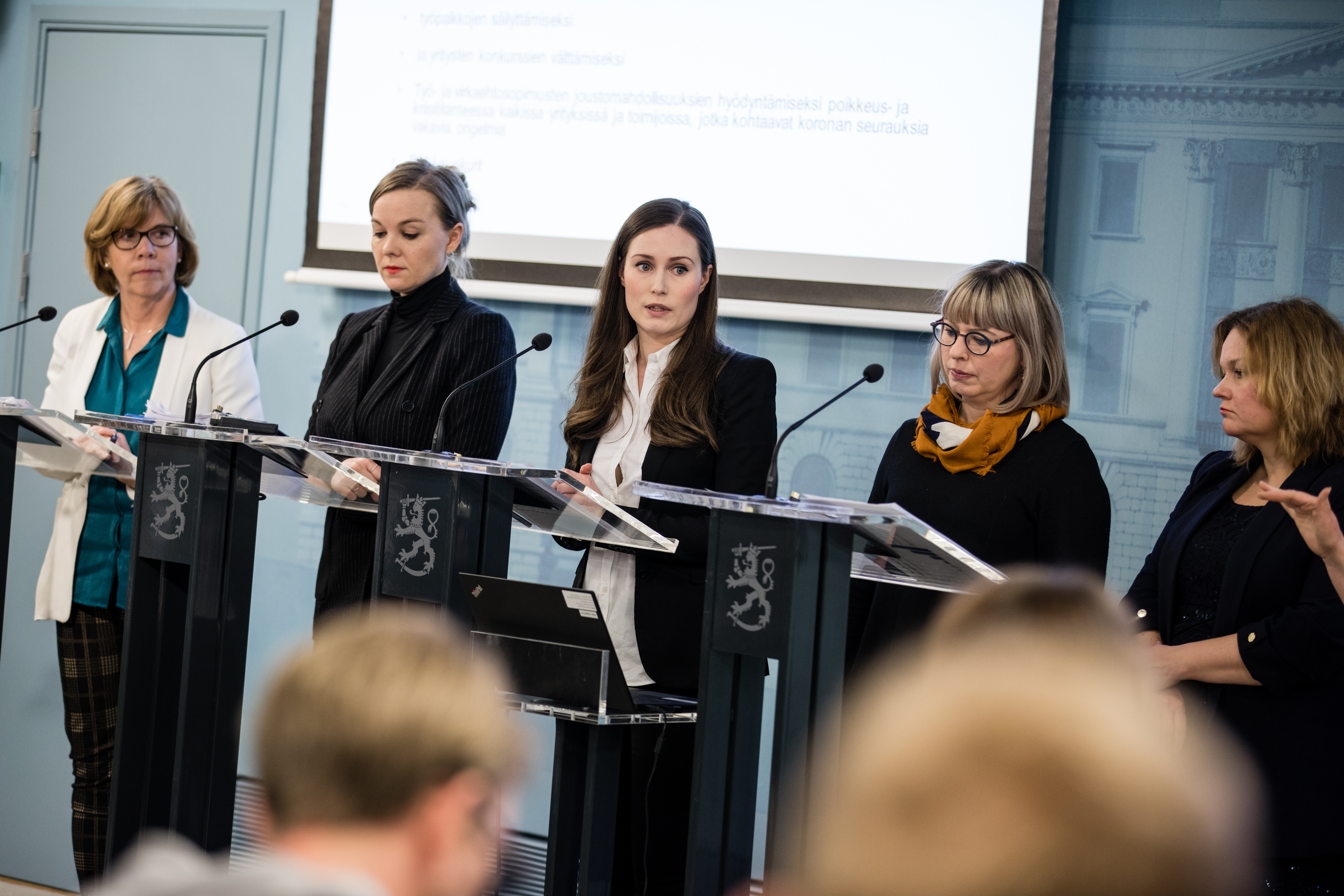
Sanna Marin's cabinet declared a state of emergency and at the same time implemented the sections of the Emergency Powers Act. on March 16.

In cooperation with the then President of the Republic, Sauli Niinistö, the Government stated on 16 March 2020 that Finland was in a state of emergency as referred to in Section 3, Paragraphs 3 and 5 of the Emergency Powers Act due to the COVID-19 coronavirus pandemic. On Friday 27 March, the Finnish police prepared to monitor the border when the decision came into force. In the afternoon, Jersey barriers and other obstacles began to be placed on the motorways. At that time, however, the border closure was not yet certain, as the Constitutional Committee of the Parliament found problems with the government's proposal. The government refined its proposal and late in the evening, the Constitutional Committee supported the proposal, and Parliament of Finland unanimously approved it.

== Enforcement ==
While the closure was in force, crossing the Uusimaa border was only permitted "for reasons such as essential work, business or holding a position of trust." 30 fixed checkpoints were established on the Uusimaa border. Anyone crossing the border had to provide the police with their identity and the reason for crossing the border. During the closure, the police also checked the travel rights of those travelling to Uusimaa by train. During the closure, the police requested official assistance from the Finnish Defence Forces, which involved up to 800 people from seven divisions. Both regular personnel and conscripts were used in the task. The Defence Forces called the Uusimaa closure operation PUOMI ("BARRIER").

During the lockdown, the police checked a total of 550,000 vehicles, of which just under one percent were turned back. Freight traffic was not blocked during the new restrictions. In a survey conducted by Iltalehti in late spring 2020, the majority of hospital districts in the rest of the country assessed that the lockdown had slowed the spread of the coronavirus.

== Lifting the restrictions ==
The government finally lifted the travel restrictions between Uusimaa and the rest of Finland on April 15, after less than three weeks in force. According to the Prime Minister, there were no longer any legal grounds for the border closure. According to the Chief of the Army's Readiness, Pasi Hirvonen, the operation was ready to continue for up to three months.

== Legality ==
Constitutional law professor Tuomas Ojanen wrote in his statement that the Uusimaa movement restriction and the wording of the Emergency Powers Act are not compatible, at least not with statutory interpretation. Constitutional law expert professor Kaarlo Tuori, constitutional law professor Veli-Pekka Viljanen, and public law professor Janne Salminen were at least of the same opinion.

== See also ==
- COVID-19 pandemic in Finland
- COVID-19 lockdowns
