= Civil Contingencies Act 2004 =

Act of the Parliament of the United Kingdom

Civil Contingencies Act 2004 (Note: Section 36.)
- Act of Parliament
- Parliament of the United Kingdom
- Long title: An Act to make provision about civil contingencies.
- Citation: 2004 c. 36
- Introduced by: Douglas Alexander (Commons)
- Territorial extent: England and Wales; Scotland; Northern Ireland, but where this Act amends or repeals an enactment or a provision of an enactment, the amendment or repeal has the same extent as the enactment or provision.; (Note: Section 35.)

Dates
- Royal assent: 18 November 2004
- Commencement: 10 December 2004 (Note: Section 34.)
Other legislation
Amends	Emergency Powers Act 1964; Land Charges Act 1972; Statute Law (Repeals) Act 1976; Energy Act 1976; Gas Act 1995
Repeals/revokes	Emergency Powers Act 1920
Amended by	National Health Service (Consequential Provisions) Act 2006; Infrastructure Act 2015

Status: Amended

Text of statute as originally enacted

Revised text of statute as amended

The Civil Contingencies Act 2004 (c. 36) is an act of the Parliament of the United Kingdom that makes provision about civil contingencies. It also replaces former civil defence and emergency powers legislation of the 20th century.

== Background to the act ==
The act repeals the Civil Defence Act 1948 (12, 13 & 14 Geo. 6. c. 5) and the Civil Defence Act (Northern Ireland) 1950. Part 1 of the act establishes a new and broad definition of "emergency". The definition includes war or attack by a foreign power, which were defined as emergencies under previous legislation, as well as terrorism which poses a threat of serious damage to the security of the United Kingdom and events which threaten serious damage to human welfare in a place in the United Kingdom or to the environment of a place in the United Kingdom. Previous legislation, which was enacted during or after the Second World War, provided for civil protection solely in terms of "civil defence", which was defined as "measures, other than actual combat, for affording defence against a hostile attack by a foreign power". The act also broadens the number of local bodies which have duties in the event of an emergency; previous legislation only related to local authorities, police authorities and certain fire authorities. Neither strand had seen any significant amendments in a number of years and they were not deemed able to cope in the event of domestic threats to services such as the fuel protests of 2000 or natural threats like the mass flooding in 2000 and the outbreak of foot and mouth disease in 2001. Further urgency was caused by the September 11, 2001 terrorist attacks in America, with concerns being raised over the adequacy of existing emergency planning to deal with a similar attack should it happen in the United Kingdom.

In the wake of these events, the Deputy Prime Minister, John Prescott, announced a formal review of emergency planning arrangements. The review included a public consultation exercise, which generally supported the government's conclusion that existing legislation was no longer adequate and that new legislation was required. A draft bill was scrutinised in detail by the Joint Committee on the Draft Civil Contingencies Bill, which was very influential in shaping the legislation, though several of its proposals (notably the creation of a new 'Civil Contingencies Agency') were rejected.

The act guides and authorises the creation of a Local Resilience Forum to consider such matters within an existing police force boundary and requires responders to undertake risk assessments, maintain them in a Community Risk Register and to publish this register. Risks in this context are those that could result in a major emergency. This Community Risk Register is the first step in the emergency planning process; it ensures that the plans that are developed are proportionate to the risk.

== The act ==
The act is divided into three parts:

- Part 1 defines the obligations of certain organisations to prepare for various types of emergencies.
- Part 2 provides additional powers for the government to use in the event of a large-scale emergency.
- Part 3 provides supplementary legislation in support of the first two parts.

=== Definition of an emergency ===
Both Part 1 and Part 2 provide definitions of an emergency for the purposes of their respective elements of the act at Section 1 and Section 19 respectively; both sections define an emergency as something that "threatens serious damage" to human welfare, the environment, or national security. A draft version of the act allowed emergency powers to be triggered merely by an event threatening "political, administrative, or economic stability", but this was replaced by the tighter "serious damage" definition following criticism.

=== Part 1: Local arrangements for civil protection ===
Part 1 of the act places a legal obligation upon emergency services and local authorities (defined as "category 1 responders" under the act) to assess the risk of, plan, and exercise for emergencies, as well as undertaking business continuity management. Category 1 responders are also responsible for warning and informing the public in relation to emergencies. Finally, local authorities are required to provide business continuity advice to local businesses. It also places legal obligations for increased co-operation and information sharing between different emergency services and also to non-emergency services that might have a role in an emergency such as electric companies (non-emergency services are defined as category 2 responders under the act).

=== Part 2: Emergency powers ===
The second part of the act provides that temporary emergency regulations are normally made through Order in Council or by a Minister of the Crown if arranging for an Order in Council would not be possible without serious delay. Such regulations are limited in duration to 30 days, unless Parliament votes to extend this period before it expires. The only primary legislation which may not be amended by emergency regulations is the Human Rights Act 1998 and part 2 of the Civil Contingencies Act itself; however, said regulations cannot be used to introduce military conscription or prohibit industrial action, nor can they be used to create an offence other than as described in Section 22(3)(i) of the act, create an offence other than one which is triable before a magistrates' court only (or, if the regulations concern Scotland, a sheriff under summary procedure), create an offence that is punishable by more than three months' imprisonment, (Note: The act also prohibits the creation of an offence that is punishable by a fine exceeding level 5 on the standard scale, which at enactment was £5,000; however, Section 85 of the Legal Aid, Sentencing and Punishment of Offenders Act 2012 replaced this with an unlimited fine in England and Wales, and so this prohibition is effectively void in that jurisdiction. Due to both Acts being passed after the devolution of lawmaking powers to Scotland in 1998, the £5,000 limit remains in force in that jurisdiction as per Section 225 of the Criminal Procedure (Scotland) Act 1995.) or alter procedure in relation to criminal proceedings.

There was an attempt by Conservative and Liberal Democrat peers to add a number of other key constitutional laws to the exemption list during the bill stage, but this ended up being defeated in the House of Commons. The peers tried to protect the following laws from emergency regulation:

- Habeas Corpus Act 1679
- Bill of Rights 1689
- Section 7 of the Parliament Act 1911 which limited the duration of a parliament to five years (Note: Section 7 was repealed by the Fixed-term Parliaments Act 2011, which was itself repealed and replaced by the Dissolution and Calling of Parliament Act 2022.)
- Act of Settlement 1701
- House of Commons Disqualification Act 1975
- Life Peerages Act 1958
- House of Lords Act 1999

The government of the day, for its part, claimed not to foresee any event in which usage of the act would affect laws of constitutional importance.

Section 21 of the act describes the conditions that would permit emergency regulations to be made; these conditions have been consistently called a "triple lock" test by the media and by the government and as recently as 2020 the government summarised the test as follows:

- An emergency has occurred, is occurring, or is about to occur;
- The provisions sought are necessary for the purpose of preventing, controlling, or mitigating an aspect or effect of the emergency;
- The need is urgent, and existing legislation and other means would risk serious delay

A 2022 post-implementation review made a similar summary, but stated the third requirement as "The legislation is appropriate and proportionate"; no such requirement for appropriateness and proportionality is mentioned in Section 21 itself, but it does appear in Section 23. To date, the provisions of Part 2 have never been activated, with Cabinet Office guidance describing it as a "last resort option".

=== Categorised responders ===
Categorised responders are organisations defined in the act as having responsibilities for carrying out the legislation.

Each responder has an emergency planning officer (sometimes called a civil protection officer, civil contingencies officer, resilience officer, or risk manager) who is usually responsible for ensuring their organisation is in compliance with the act and sharing information with other responders. The usual way of checking compliance is by regularly testing plans by reviews or exercises.

The Armed Forces, despite having a defined policy of providing aid to the civil authorities as needed (and regularly doing so), are not a categorised responder for the purposes of the Act.

==== Category 1 responders ====
Category 1 responders are known as core responders; they include the usual "blue-light" emergency services, as well as others:

- Local authorities
- Police forces, including the British Transport Police, Civil Nuclear Constabulary and Ministry of Defence Police
- Fire services
- Ambulance services
- HM Coastguard
- NHS hospital trusts, NHS foundation trusts (and Welsh equivalents), NHS Scotland Territorial Health Boards, NHS England, NHS Integrated Care Boards in England, UK Health Security Agency, and Public Health Wales
- Port health authorities
- The Environment Agency, the Scottish Environment Protection Agency, and Natural Resources Wales

==== Category 2 responders ====
Category 2 responders are key co-operating responders that act in support of the category 1 responders. Category 2 responders are mostly utility companies and transport organisations:

===== Utilities =====
- Electricity distributors and transmitters
- Gas distributors
- Water and sewerage undertakers
- Telephone service providers (fixed and mobile)

===== Transport =====
- Network Rail
- Train operating companies (passenger and freight)
- London Underground
- Transport for London
- National Highways
- Airport operators
- Harbour authorities

===== Others =====
- The Health and Safety Executive
- The Coal Authority
- The Met Office

=== Section 34 – Commencement ===
The following orders have been made under sections 34(1) and (3):

- The Civil Contingencies Act 2004 (Commencement No. 1) Order 2004 (SI 2004/3281 (C. 148))
- The Civil Contingencies Act 2004 (Commencement No. 2) Order 2005 (SI 2005/772 (C. 33))
- The Civil Contingencies Act 2004 (Commencement No. 3) Order 2005 (SI 2005/2040 (C. 89))
- The Civil Contingencies Act 2004 (Commencement) (Scotland) Order 2005 (SSI 2005/493 (C. 26)), made under sections 34(2) and (3).

== Reactions ==
=== To draft versions ===
In the context of a draft version of the act, specifically after the "serious damage" definition of an emergency and other alterations had been introduced, Liberty's Shami Chakrabarti said that the government had responded to most of her group's concerns about the act and there was "cause to welcome it", but noted that provisions allowing the declaration of a state of emergency in the case of disruption to communications networks remained a cause for concern. Statewatch's Tony Bunyan was more critical of the act; he said that the changes made to it were "limited concessions" which "in no way change[d] the fundamental objections" to it, that it would give "truly draconian" powers to the government and to state agencies, and that it was "Britain's Patriot Act" which could, "at a stroke", replace democracy with totalitarianism. The Conservatives' then-Shadow Home Secretary David Davis said the act was "necessary" and "seriously overdue" but worried that its definition of an emergency was still too wide and believed that Parliament needed a say on ministers' use of its powers, while the Liberal Democrats' then-spokesman Tom Brake said that the modified Act was better but concerns remained and that more funding for emergency planning was needed; Brake was also critical of what he called the government's "trust me" attitude over the act.

=== After enactment ===
According to Clive Walker and James Broderick's commentary on the act, published two years after its enactment:

The Government’s handling of risks and emergencies in recent years has failed to inspire public confidence. In a range of crises, from the Foot and Mouth outbreak through to the grounds for war in Iraq, official predictions or capabilities have been found wanting. The Civil Contingencies Act 2004 tenders reassurance by the promise of systemic planning and activity in civil resilience, though defence lies beyond its scope. The wide-ranging powers in the act have the capability of delivering on the promise. But, as shall be revealed in this book, efforts will be hampered because the legislation is hesitant and uneven.

A more critical view of the act is taken by Henry Porter in his 2009 novel The Dying Light, which describes a conspiracy to subvert democracy, based on the modern state's capacity to collect and cross-refer personal information. The afterword to the novel asserts that the act "enables the Prime Minister, a minister, or the Government Chief Whip to dismantle democracy and the Rule of Law overnight [...] on the mere conviction that an emergency is about to take place, and there is no sanction against that person if the powers are invoked wrongly". Peter Hitchens made a similar assessment of the act having the potential "to turn Britain into a dictatorship overnight, if politicians can find an excuse to activate it."

As part of a wider 2009 paper on the sharing of terrorism-related information with firefighters, Bryan Heirston, then the deputy chief of the Oklahoma City Fire Department, assessed the information-sharing framework laid out in Part 1 of the act and found it to compare favourably to contemporary information-sharing procedures for American first responders.

=== In the context of Brexit ===
There were two occasions in 2019, both in the context of Brexit, that caused some renewed attention to be drawn to the act.

In January 2019 it was claimed that the government would make use of the act as part of Operation Yellowhammer if existing legislation proved insufficient to cover any essential contingency measures necessitated by a no-deal Brexit. Outlets such as The Times and Sky News went so far as to label the potential implementation of the act a plan for martial law. British government departments insisted that existing legislation would be sufficient and there were no plans to use the act. Health Secretary Matt Hancock said that the act "remain[ed] on the statute book" but was not "the focus of [the Government's] attention", and Cabinet Secretary Mark Sedwill also said that the government did not expect to use emergency powers to manage a no-deal Brexit.

In September 2019, following the passage of the so-called Benn Act which compelled Prime Minister Boris Johnson to seek an extension to the Brexit withdrawal date if the House of Commons did not give its consent to either a withdrawal agreement or a no-deal Brexit by 19 October 2019, and following Johnson's verbal insistence on having the United Kingdom leave the European Union by the original date of 31 October 2019, the Civil Contingencies Act was speculated to be one of several options that Johnson could use to circumvent the Benn Act. Both Liberal Democrat leader Vince Cable and Labour Shadow Brexit Secretary Keir Starmer accused Johnson of deliberately talking about the prospect of civil unrest in the event of a blocked Brexit in order to engineer circumstances that would permit him to use the Civil Contingencies Act; former Attorney General Dominic Grieve said that to use the act in this manner would be a "constitutional outrage". Similarly, former Prime Minister and Conservative leader John Major said that he "feared" that Johnson would use an Order of Council to nullify the Benn Act until after 31 October; while Major did not specifically refer to the Civil Contingencies Act, it was believed that any attempt to use Orders of Council as suggested would likely utilise provisions of the act. The government said that it was not planning to use the act, while experts such as Jolyon Maugham and Professor Mark Elliott of the University of Cambridge did not believe that any attempt to use it would actually succeed.

In the event, no attempt to circumvent the Benn Act through the Civil Contingencies Act or through other means ever materialised; Johnson ultimately complied with the Benn Act and formally requested the president of the European Council for an extension to the Brexit withdrawal date on 19 October 2019. Likewise, the possibility of the Civil Contingencies Act being used in response to the potential consequences of a no-deal Brexit was never realised since a Brexit deal was formalised on 17 October 2019 and signed on 24 January 2020.

=== In the context of COVID-19 ===
The government considered making use of the act in response to the COVID-19 pandemic, but ultimately took the view that "there was time to pass conventional legislation [the Coronavirus Act 2020], which allowed for prior Parliamentary scrutiny to the measures being introduced ... and, therefore, [the Civil Contingencies Act's] use was not necessary or appropriate". When assessing Parliamentary scrutiny of the government's response to the pandemic, the Public Administration and Constitutional Affairs Select Committee was "not convinced" by the government's arguments for not using the Civil Contingencies Act and believed "there was a potential role for the [Act] in providing a 'stop-gap' for more detailed scrutiny of the Coronavirus Bill to take place". While it called on the government to consider such "stop-gap" use of the Civil Contingencies Act in response to future emergencies, the Committee concluded that the government's "reticence" to use the act in response to the "genuine national emergency" posed by the pandemic "calls into question how fit for purpose that legislation is."

=== Review ===
In March 2022, the National Preparedness Commission published an independent review of the UK Civil Contingencies Act 2004. The review highlighted how the act provided an important regulatory framework for contingencies but that further reform is needed to ensure it continues to provide resilience for the UK.

== See also ==
- Emergency planning in Wales
- Preceding legislation:
  - Defence of the Realm Act 1914
    - Restoration of Order in Ireland Act 1920
  - Emergency Powers Act 1920
  - Emergency Powers Act (Northern Ireland) 1926
  - Emergency Powers (Defence) Act 1939
  - Civil Defence Act 1948
  - Emergency Powers Act 1964
  - Transition to war#Legal framework
  - Civil Protection in Peacetime Act 1986
