= Operation Isotrope =

British military operation

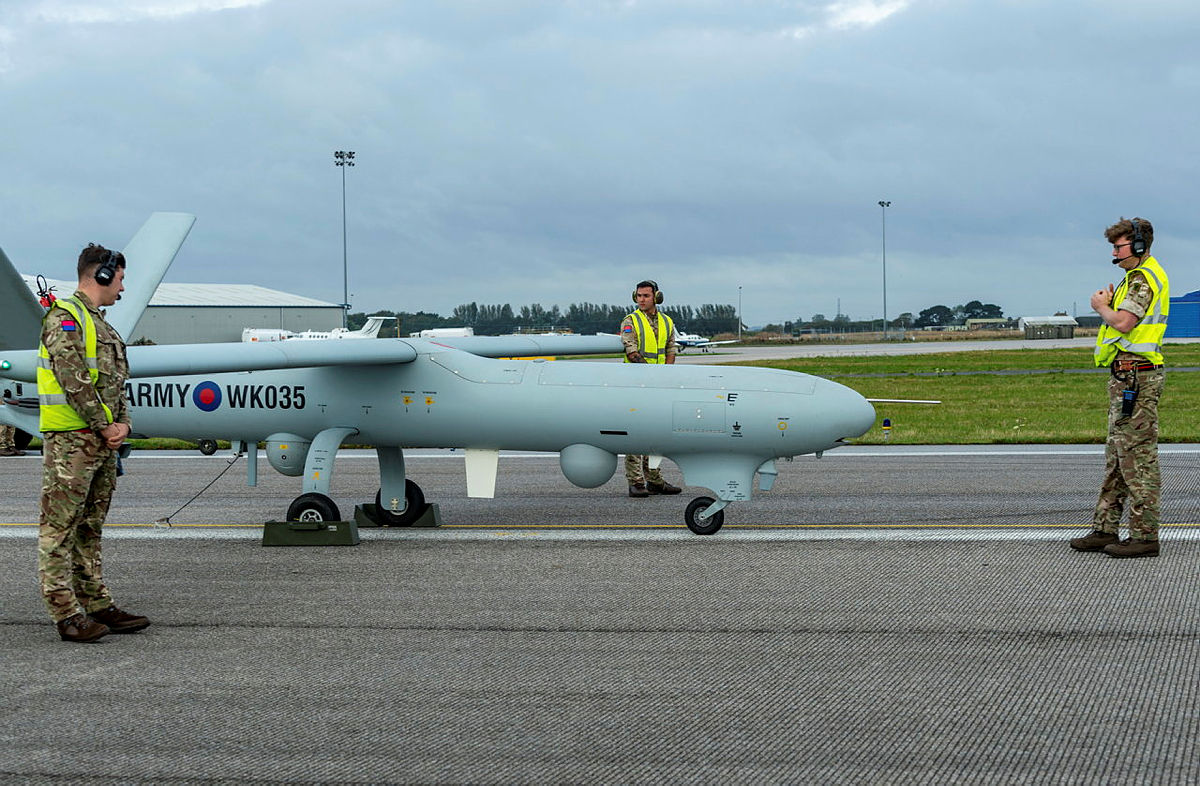
- A British Army Watchkeeper UAV at Lydd Airport in Kent (August 2020)
- Location: English Channel
- Objective: To intercept and deter migrant boats from arriving in UK waters
- Date: 16 January 2022 – 31 January 2023
- Executed by: United Kingdom

Operation Isotrope was a British military operation to assist the Border Force and other civil authorities in responding to the English Channel migrant crossings which began in 2018. The operation was first announced in January 2022 by Prime Minister Boris Johnson amid an upsurge in migrant crossings. It placed the Royal Navy in command and control of all government vessels involved in counter-migration operations. Its objective was to deter migrant crossings, as well as intercept any boats before they reached British shores. Since the operation began, only a single migrant vessel had reached British shores without escort, however the Royal Navy's effect on the crisis was disputed with some experts criticising the government's strategy as counter-productive and an unnecessary demand on the Royal Navy's finite resources.

By July 2022, efforts were reportedly being made to release the Royal Navy from the operation; it ended in January 2023.

== History ==
=== Background ===
Migrants have crossed the English Channel from France since the 1990s when migrant camps began to form in Calais. In 2015, one of these encampments, unofficially named the Calais Jungle, drew wide attention due to its size as a result of the 2015 European migrant crisis. Crossings by boat were rare, however, with migrants more commonly crossing via the Channel Tunnel. Following the UK's departure from the European Union (Brexit), people smugglers began telling migrants that the border between the UK and France would be closed. This led to a rush of migrants crossing the English Channel by boat. On 28 December 2018, Home Secretary Sajid Javid declared a major incident as rising numbers of migrants made crossings via boat; he warned there was a serious risk of people losing their lives as the Strait of Dover was one of the world’s busiest shipping lanes. A total of 297 migrants crossed the channel during the year and organised criminal gangs of people smugglers were accused of being responsible. In 2019, approximately 1,900 migrants crossed the English Channel. This increased significantly to 8,500 in 2020. The increase was blamed on improved security at ports and the Channel Tunnel which drove migrants to cross via the sea. Most of the migrants were from Iran, Iraq and Syria. Responding to the situation, the Border Force deployed a cutter and two off-shore patrol vessels. Civilian contractors also provided two unmanned aerial vehicles and up to four piloted aircraft for surveillance.

In August 2020, Javid's successor, Home Secretary Priti Patel, made a formal request for military assistance via the military aid to the civil authorities (MACA) mechanism after declaring an intent to make crossings "unviable". She also appointed former Royal Marine Dan O’Mahoney the Clandestine Channel Threat Commander, a new role to lead the UK's response to tackle migrant crossings.

=== Operation Devran and initial military support ===
In August 2020, the UK deployed an Airbus A400M Atlas transport aircraft from the Royal Air Force to fly surveillance missions in support of Her Majesty's Coastguard and Border Force. This was the first reported use of military support to tackle the migrant crossings. It was closely followed by the deployment of a Boeing P-8 Poseidon maritime patrol aircraft from RAF Kinloss.

In September 2020, the British Army deployed Thales Watchkeeper WK450 UAVs from 47th Regiment Royal Artillery to carry out surveillance for both the British and French authorities. The UAVs operated from Lydd Airport in Kent and were part of a deployment code-named Operation Devran. Beechcraft Shadow surveillance aircraft were also on standby to assist.

=== Operation Isotrope ===
On 16 January 2022, it was reported that plans were being drawn up to place the Royal Navy in operational command of English Channel counter-migration operations. These plans were implemented in March, with all involved government vessels placed under the command of Commander UK Strike Force Mike Utley. The over-arching aim of Operation Isotrope was said to be deterrence, in addition to the interception of any boats to prevent illegal migrants from landing on UK shores. According to Defence Minister James Heappey, Royal Navy vessels most likely to be used in the operation were some of the Batch 1 River-class offshore patrol vessels and some smaller Archer-class patrol vessels. Heappey also stated that the Royal Navy would not be involved in the use of controversial pushback tactics, whereby migrant boats would be made to return to France, however this information was contradicted by Home Office Ministers who stated that a decision on such tactics had not yet been made. A subsequent trial carried out by the Royal Marines ultimately led to these tactics no longer being considered by the government. According to Heappey, Royal Navy ships would more likely be involved in command and control (C2) operations, rather than in interdiction, as most Royal Navy ships sit too high above the waterline to be credible platforms to board dinghies.

Around 200 military personnel, mainly drawn from the British Army, are involved with the operation. The Royal Navy's offshore patrol vessel, HMS Severn, is also committed to the operation, alongside six Archer-class inshore patrol vessels, three rigid inflatable boats and one AgustaWestland AW159 Wildcat helicopter. Due to Severn's height above the waterline, she is not used for interdiction and is instead used for on-site command and control.

Since the operation began, only a single known migrant vessel has made it to British shores without a naval or Border Force escort. On 12 July 2022, Defence Minister Heappey stated that efforts were being made to release the Royal Navy from the operation. However, Home Office officials are concerned its withdrawal may send the wrong message to people-smugglers.

Operation Isotrope ceased on 31 January 2023, with a newly-formed Small Boats Operational Command standing up.

== Reaction ==
Retired Vice Admiral and former head of the Border Force Charles Montgomery criticised the government's strategy, stating that Royal Navy ships would be a "honeypot" for migrants and would make crossings attractive. The House of Commons Defence Committee published a report in March 2022 condemning "squabbling" between the Ministry of Defence and the Home Office over the use of pushback tactics. It also criticised the government for "overstretching" the Royal Navy's finite resources. It added that the MOD had "little to gain and much to lose" out of its involvement.

In an interview with France 3, Mayor of Calais Natacha Bouchart described the British government's deployment of the Royal Navy as a "declaration of maritime war" which would prolong her city's economic suffering and worsen the humanitarian situation.
