= Operation Temperer =

British government military plan

Operation Temperer is a British government plan to deploy troops to support and free up police officers in key locations following a major terrorist attack or major public disorder. It was put into effect for the first time on 22 May 2017 following the bombing of an Ariana Grande concert at Manchester Arena, and for a second time following the Parsons Green bombing.

HQ Standing Joint Commander is militarily responsible for directing the deployment, if ordered.

== Background ==
The plan provides for up to 5,100 service personnel from all 3 services to be deployed to "augment armed police officers engaged in protective security duties" at key sites in the United Kingdom. In practice, troops and military police would replace some police officers particularly from the Metropolitan Police, Ministry of Defence Police and the Civil Nuclear Constabulary guarding sites of national interest or critical national infrastructure such as nuclear power stations, military garrisons, Buckingham Palace and Parliament so they can be deployed on either armed or unarmed frontline operational duties.

According to government sources cited by the Daily Telegraph, it would only be triggered following a COBR meeting. The plan was put in place following the January 2015 Île-de-France attacks in France. It was intended to be kept secret, but was accidentally disclosed in July 2015 after being inadvertently uploaded to the website of the National Police Chiefs' Council. It was said to have been contentious with the Army leadership, due to concerns about it causing overstretch, training given to troops, morale problems and difficulties with deciding when to end the operation.

The British armed forces have previously deployed to support the police, most notably during the Troubles in Northern Ireland when 21,000 troops were deployed to assist the Royal Ulster Constabulary in Operation Banner. In 2003, Tony Blair's government temporarily deployed 450 troops to Heathrow Airport and other London locations during a period of heightened terrorist threat. Plans to support the police and increase the numbers of officers deployed on the streets began after the 2011 England riots.

Other European countries have also deployed troops to guard against terrorist threats in cities; France has deployed over 10,000 troops under Operation Sentinelle since the January 2015 attacks in the Paris region, and Italy also deployed 4,800 troops in Rome and other cities in February 2015.

== Activation ==
=== Manchester Arena bombing ===
Operation Temperer
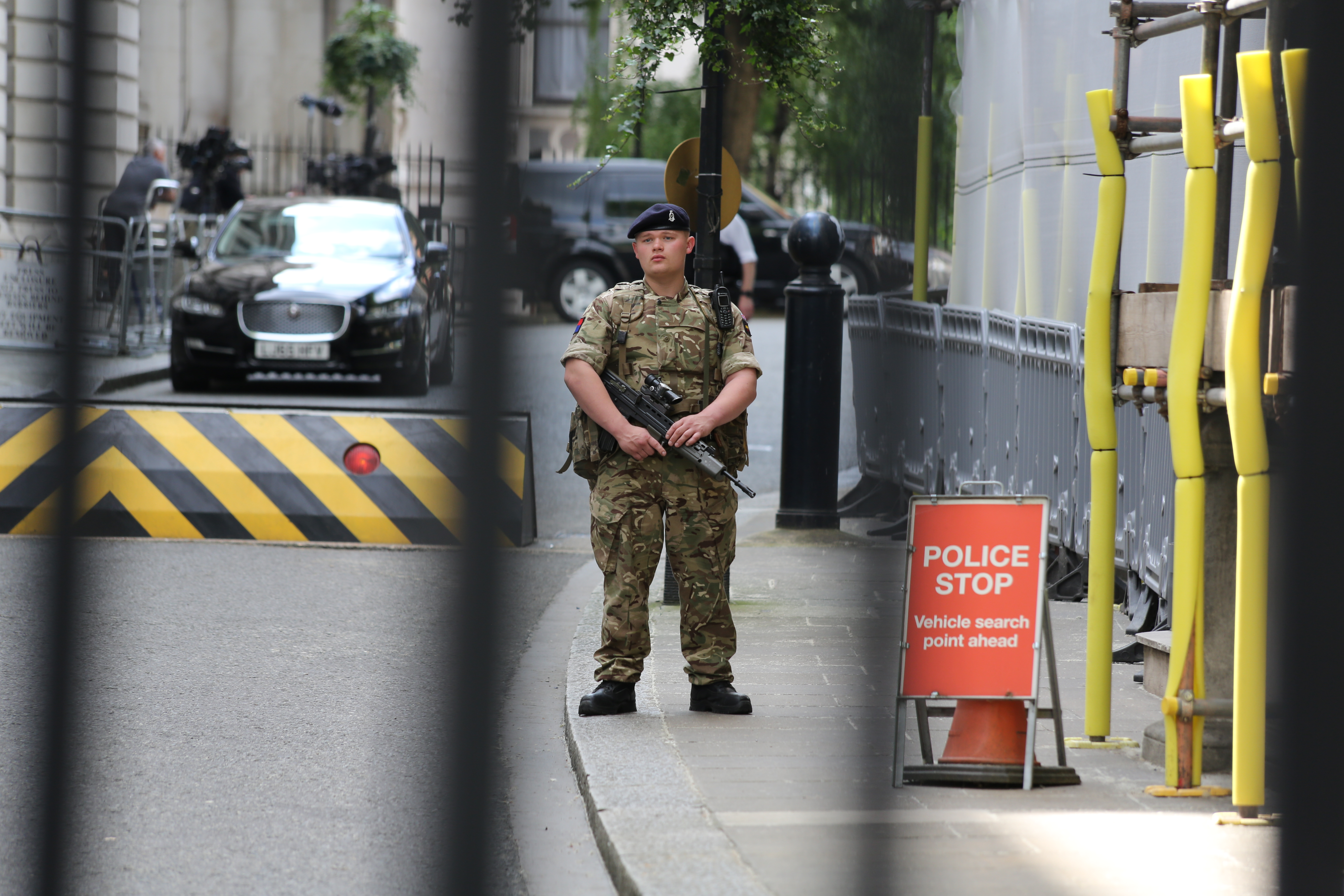
- British military personnel guarding Downing Street as part of Operation Temperer
- Type: Counter-terrorist operation
- Location: United Kingdom
- Commanded by: Theresa May
- Date: 15:33, 23 May 2017 – 30 May 2017 (GMT)

The plan was activated for the first time on 23 May 2017 following the Manchester Arena bombing. Prime Minister Theresa May announced that the police had asked for military support and the request had been approved by Sir Michael Fallon, the Secretary of State for Defence. The operation remained in force until the end of the bank holiday weekend, despite the threat level being reduced from critical to severe on 27 May.

The website Warfare.Today identified the military deployment as involving units from the Foot Guards, the 2nd Battalion, The Parachute Regiment (2 PARA) and the Royal Artillery, with additional assistance expected from the Royal Marines, the RAF Regiment and the RAF Police.

=== Parsons Green bombing ===
Operation Temperer
- Type: Counter-terrorist operation
- Location: United Kingdom
- Commanded by: Theresa May
- Date: 20:26, 15 September 2017 – 17 September 2017 (UTC +1)

The operation was activated again on 15 September 2017 when the threat level was raised to critical in the aftermath of the Parsons Green bombing, with military personnel replacing police officers on armed guarding duties.

=== COVID-19 pandemic ===
On 22 September 2020, Prime Minister Boris Johnson stated to Parliament that he would actively consider the use of the military under Operation Temperer to assist police forces to enforce COVID-19 pandemic restrictions. Military personnel would not be enforcing restrictions themselves, but would instead take over guard duties from the police at high-profile sites, to reduce the overall pressure on policing resources.

== See also ==
- Military aid to the civil power
- Operation Banner, the operational name for the British Armed Forces' operation in Northern Ireland from August 1969 to July 2007, as part of the Troubles
- Operation Vigilant Guardian, similar operation by the Belgian army
- Opération Sentinelle, French Army equivalent
