= Emergency planning in Wales =

Emergency planning in Wales is carried out in line with the Civil Contingencies Act 2004 however as a result of devolution it is managed with its own ‘welsh flavour.’ For instance there are unique bodies operating in Wales like The Joint Emergency Services Group (JESG) and there is involvement from The Welsh Government.

== Wales Resilience Forum ==
The Wales Resilience Forum is the highest level of emergency planning in Wales. It meets three times a year and is chaired by the First Minister.

== Regional Local Resilience Forums ==
There are four Local Resilience Forums (LRF) in Wales, based on the areas of the four Welsh Police Areas:

- Dyfed Powys Local Resilience Forum (Dyfed Powys LRF or DPLRF)
- Gwent Local Resilience Forum (Gwent LRF or GLRF)
- North Wales Local Resilience Forum (North Wales LRF or NWLRF)
- South Wales Local Resilience Forum (South Wales LRF or SWLRF)

Each LRF includes the regional emergency services, the principal councils, and local health boards, a number of other government agencies that have responsibilities in the region, such as Public Health Wales and the Health and Safety Executive, and also transport agencies, utility companies, and the military.

The LRFs were established in 2004, as a requirement of the Civil Contingencies Act 2004, and effectively replaced the regional organisations such as the Gwent Emergency Planning and Liaison Group and the South Wales Emergency Services Liaison Committee that had been operating since 1994.

=== Responsibilities ===
The Local Resilience Forums are responsible for assessing risks, planning responses, and recovery from a range of incidents that could have a major impact on their areas. Incidents are classified as hazards or threats. Hazards are non-malicious events and typically include:

- Transport accidents
- Severe weather
- Flooding
- Industrial accidents and environmental pollution
- Human health risks
- Animal health risks
- Industrial technical failure

Threats are planned events, such as a terrorist attack, and typically include:

- Attacks using explosives
- Chemical, biological, radiological or nuclear threats
- Electronic attacks affecting utilities and communications

=== Legislation ===
The Local Regional Forums have specific duties defined by the following legislation:

- Civil Contingencies Act 2004
- The Control of Major Accident Hazard Regulations 1999
- The Pipeline Safety Regulations 1996
- Radiation (Emergency Preparedness & Public Information) Regulations 2001

=== Summary and areas of the four Local Resilience Forums ===
Forum	Emergency services	Principal councils	Health organisations	Area
Dyfed-Powys	Dyfed-Powys Police; Mid and West Wales Fire & Rescue; Welsh Ambulance Service	Carmarthenshire; Ceredigion; Pembrokeshire; Powys	Hywel Dda UHB; Powys Teaching Health Board	A map of Wales in yellow with a large area in green (about 60%) from the right (east) to the bottom left (south west)
Gwent	Gwent Police; South Wales Fire and Rescue; Welsh Ambulance Service	Blaenau Gwent; Caerphilly; Monmouthshire; Newport; Torfaen	Aneurin Bevan UHB	A map of Wales in yellow with a small area in green (about 5%) at the bottom right (south east)
North Wales	North Wales Fire and Rescue; North Wales Police; Welsh Ambulance Service	Anglesey; Conwy; Denbighshire; Flintshire; Gwynedd; Wrexham	Betsi Cadwaladr UHB	A map of Wales in yellow with a small area in green (about 25%) at the bottom centre (south)
South Wales	Mid and West Wales Fire and Rescue; South Wales Fire and Rescue; South Wales Police; Welsh Ambulance Service	Bridgend; Cardiff; Merthyr Tydfil; Neath Port Talbot; Rhondda Cynon Taf; Swansea; Vale of Glamorgan	Cardiff and Vale UHB; Cwm Taf UHB; Abertawe Bro Morgannwg UHB	A map of Wales in yellow with an area in green (about 10%) at the top (north)

In addition, a number of other government agencies are also partners of the four Welsh local resilience forums including:

- British Transport Police
- Maritime and Coastguard Agency
- Public Health Wales
- Natural Resources Wales
- The Met Office
- Health and Safety Executive
- and also utility companies, transport agencies, and the military.
