= Civil Defence Act 1948 =

Act of the Parliament of the United Kingdom

Civil Defence Act 1948 (Note: Section 11(1).)
- Act of Parliament
- Parliament of the United Kingdom
- Long title: An Act to make further provision for civil defence.
- Citation: 12, 13 & 14 Geo. 6. c. 5
- Territorial extent: England and Wales; Scotland; Northern Ireland (section 10); (Note: Section 10.)

Dates
- Royal assent: 16 December 1948
- Commencement: 16 December 1948 (Note: The Acts of Parliament (Commencement) Act 1793.)
- Repealed: 14 November 2005 (Note: The Civil Contingencies Act 2004 (Commencement No.3) Order 2005 (SI 2005/2040).)
Other legislation
Amends	Air Raid Precautions Act 1937; Civil Defence (Suspension of Powers) Act 1945
Amended by	Police Act 1964; Police (Scotland) Act 1967; Statute Law (Repeals) Act 1986; Statute Law (Repeals) Act 1993; Civil Defence (Grant) Act 2002
Repealed by	Civil Contingencies Act 2004

Status: Repealed

Text of statute as originally enacted

Revised text of statute as amended

The Civil Defence Act 1948 (12, 13 & 14 Geo. 6. c. 5) was an act of the Parliament of the United Kingdom.

== Provisions ==
The act set out legislation for civil defence procedures in the United Kingdom.

Local authorities were required to plan for an attack by a hostile power. The act also allowed the relevant minister to designate functions for local authorities to perform under the act.

== Further developments ==
The act was amended by the Civil Defence (Grant) Act 2002 to allow for a mechanism which would determining grants to local emergency planning units.

The whole act was repealed by section 32(2) of, and schedule 3 to, the Civil Contingencies Act 2004, which came into force on 14 November 2005.

== See also ==
- Civil Defence Act (Northern Ireland) 1950
