= Kaarlo Tuori =

Finnish legal scholar

Kaarlo Heikki Tuori (born 9 April 1948) is a Finnish legal scholar.

He was born in Helsinki. After taking his doctorate in jurisprudence in 1983, he eventually became professor of jurisprudence at the University of Helsinki. His main works are Oikeuden rationalisuus (1988), Oikeus, valta ja demokratia (1990) and Critical Legal Positivism (2002, originally Kriittinen oikeuspositivismi, 2000). He is a member of the Norwegian Academy of Science and Letters.

== Notable works ==
In English:

- Critical Legal Positivism (2002) ISBN 9781138246539
- Ratio and Voluntas: The Tension between Law and Reason in Law (2011) ISBN 9781138249882
- Tuori, Kaarlo; Tuori, Klaus: The Eurozone Crisis: A Constitutional Analysis. Cambridge: Cambridge University Press, 2014. ISBN 978-1-107-64945-3.
- European Constitutionalism. Cambridge: Cambridge University Press, 2015. ISBN 9781107087095.
- Properties of Law: Modern Law and After. Cambridge: Cambridge University Press, 2021. ISBN 9781108948807.
