= Emergency Powers Act 1964 =

Act of the Parliament of the United Kingdom

Emergency Powers Act 1964 (Note: Section 3(1).)
- Act of Parliament
- Parliament of the United Kingdom
- Long title: An Act to amend the Emergency Powers Act 1920 and make permanent the Defence (Armed Forces) Regulations 1939.
- Citation: 1964 c. 38
- Introduced by: Henry Brooke (Commons)
- Territorial extent: England and Wales; Scotland; Northern Ireland (except section 1); (Note: Section 3(2).)

Dates
- Royal assent: 10 June 1964
- Commencement: 10 June 1964 (Note: The Acts of Parliament (Commencement) Act 1793.)

Other legislation
- Amends: Emergency Powers Act 1920
- Amended by: Civil Contingencies Act 2004
- Relates to: Defence of the Realm Act 1914; Emergency Powers Act 1920; Emergency Powers Act (Northern Ireland) 1926; Emergency Powers (Defence) Act 1939; Northern Ireland (Emergency Provisions) Act 1973

Status: Amended

Text of statute as originally enacted

Revised text of statute as amended

Text of the Emergency Powers Act 1964 as in force today (including any amendments) within the United Kingdom, from legislation.gov.uk.

The Emergency Powers Act 1964 (c. 38) is an act of the Parliament of the United Kingdom and was passed to amend the Emergency Powers Act 1920 (10 & 11 Geo. 5. c. 55) and make permanent the Defence (Armed Forces) Regulations 1939. Section 1 of this act did not apply to Northern Ireland.

Section 1(1) of the Emergency Powers Act 1920 (10 & 11 Geo. 5. c. 55) which stated:

If at any time it appears to His Majesty that any action has been taken or is immediately threatened by any persons or body of persons of such a nature and on so extensive a scale as to be calculated, by interfering with the supply and distribution of food, water, fuel, or light, or with the means of locomotion, to deprive the community, or any substantial portion of the community, of the essentials of life, His Majesty may, by proclamation (hereinafter referred to as a proclamation of emergency), declare that a state of emergency exists.

was amended:

...for the words from 'any action' to 'so extensive a scale' there shall be substituted the words 'there have occurred, or are about to occur, events of such a nature'.

== Subsequent developments ==
Section 1 was repealed by the Civil Contingencies Act 2004.

Section 2 of this act made permanent regulation 6 of the Defence (Armed Forces) Regulations 1939 (SR&O 1939/1304), which allowed soldiers "temporary employment in agricultural work or in other work, being urgent work of national importance".

In 2004, the Joint Committee of the House of Commons and House of Lords named this act a "fundamental part of the constitutional law" of the UK.
