= Clive Walker (legal scholar) =

British legal scholar

Clive Walker is a British legal scholar and professor emeritus of Criminal Justice Studies at the School of Law, University of Leeds.

Much of his academic work relates to Terrorism and the law. As well as publications, he has been appointed since 2011 as the Senior Special Adviser to the Independent Reviewer of Terrorism Legislation who advises the UK Home Office. Other publications and projects have considered Policing and police powers, Media law, Civil Liberties and Human Rights, and various aspects of Public Law.

== Education ==
His qualifications include: LLB (Hons, First Class) - University of Leeds, 1975; Law Society's Qualifying Examinations, Part II (Hons., Second Class, 1976); Solicitor of the Supreme Court (admitted 1978); PhD (The Prevention of Terrorism in British Law) - University of Manchester, 1982; LLD (Terrorism and the Law) - University of Manchester, 2015; KC (Hon), 2016.

== Visiting professorships ==
He has also held visiting professorships at: University of Louisville, 1993; George Washington University, 1995; University of Miami, 2000; University of Connecticut, 2003; Stanford University, 2006; University of Washington, 2006; Sultan Qaboos University 2007; University of Melbourne, 2007; Institute of Advanced Legal Studies (University of London), 2009; University of New South Wales, 2012; University of Toronto 2016.

== Research ==
Walker's specialist area of research is terrorism and the law. His book publications include:

- Hogan, G and Walker, C.P., Political Violence and the Law in Ireland (Manchester University Press, Manchester, 1989) (ISBN 978-07190-2910-3)
- Walker, C.P., The Prevention of Terrorism in British Law (Second edition, Manchester University Press, Manchester, 1992) (ISBN 978-07190-3175-5)
- Walker, C.P. and Starmer, K, (eds), Justice in Error (Blackstone Press, London, 1993) (ISBN 978-18543-1234-1)
- Walker, C.P. and Starmer, K., (ed.), Miscarriages of Justice (Blackstone Press, London, 1999) (ISBN 978-18543-1687-5)
- Akdeniz, Y., Walker, C., and Wall, D., The Internet, Law and Society (Longman, London, 2000) (ISBN 978-05823-5656-6)
- Weaver, R.L., Kenyon, A.T., Partlett, D.E., Walker, C.P., The Right to Speak Ill: Defamation, Reputation and Free Speech (Carolina Academic Press, Durham, North Carolina, 2006) (ISBN 978-0-89089-489-7)
- Walker, C. and Broderick, J., The Civil Contingencies Act 2004: Risk, Resilience and the Law in the United Kingdom (Oxford University Press, 2006) (ISBN 978-01992-9626-2)
- Walker, C.P., Terrorism and the Law (Oxford University Press, Oxford, 2011) (ISBN 978-01995-6117-9)
- Walker, C.P. and Weaver, R.L., Free Speech in an Internet Era (Carolina Academic Press, Durham, NC, 2013) (ISBN 978-1-61163-407-5)
- Masferrer, A., and Walker, C., (eds.), Counter-Terrorism, Human Rights And The Rule Of Law: Crossing Legal Boundaries in Defence of the State (Edward Elgar, Cheltenham, 2013) (ISBN 978-17819-5446-1)
- King, C., and Walker, C. (eds), Dirty Assets: Emerging Issues in the Regulation of Criminal and Terrorist Assets (Ashgate, Farnham, 2014) (ISBN 978-14094-6253-8)
- Walker, C.P., The Anti-Terrorism Legislation (Third edition, Oxford University Press, Oxford, 2014) (ISBN 978-01996-7792-4)
- Walker, C.P. (ed.), Contingencies, Resilience and Legal Constitutionalism (Routledge, Abingdon, 2015) (ISBN 978-11388-9042-8)
- Lennon, G. and Walker, C. (eds.), Routledge Handbook of Law and Terrorism (Routledge, Abingdon, 2015) (ISBN 978-11381-0385-6)
- King, C., Walker, C., Gurulé, J. (Eds.), The Palgrave Handbook of Criminal and Terrorism Financing Law (Palgrave MacMillan, London, 2018) (ISBN 978-3-319-64497-4)
