= Emergency Powers Act 1920 =

Act of the Parliament of the United Kingdom

Emergency Powers Act 1920 (Note: Section 3(1).)
- Act of Parliament
- Parliament of the United Kingdom
- Long title: An Act to make exceptional provision for the Protection of the Community in cases of Emergency.
- Citation: 10 & 11 Geo. 5. c. 55
- Introduced by: Edward Shortt
- Territorial extent: England and Wales; Scotland; (Note: Section 3(2).)

Dates
- Royal assent: 29 October 1920
- Commencement: 29 October 1920 (Note: The Acts of Parliament (Commencement) Act 1793.)
- Repealed: 10 December 2004 (Note: The Civil Contingencies Act 2004 (Commencement No.1) Order 2004 (SI 2004/3281).)
Other legislation
Amended by	Criminal Justice Act 1948; Statute Law Revision Act 1963; Emergency Powers Act 1964; Criminal Procedure (Scotland) Act 1975; Criminal Justice Act 1982; Statute Law (Repeals) Act 1986; Statute Law (Repeals) Act 1993
Repealed by	Civil Contingencies Act 2004
Relates to	Defence of the Realm Act 1914; Restoration of Order in Ireland Act 1920; Emergency Powers (Defence) Act 1939; Emergency Powers Act (Northern Ireland) 1926

Status: Repealed

Text of statute as originally enacted

Revised text of statute as amended

The Emergency Powers Act 1920 (10 & 11 Geo. 5. c. 55) was an act of the Parliament of the United Kingdom that gave the sovereign power, in certain circumstances, to declare a state of emergency by proclamation. The act also authorised emergency regulations to be issued by Order in Council.

Passed during the time in office of the Lloyd George Coalition Government, the act made permanent the powers of the war-time Defence of the Realm Acts. The act did not apply to Ireland, where due to the War of Independence the Restoration of Order in Ireland Act 1920 was already in force.

== Overview ==
The exact grounds for such a proclamation by the monarch are defined in the act as:

...any action has been taken or is immediately threatened by any persons or body of persons of such a nature and on so extensive a scale as to be calculated, by interfering with the supply and distribution of food, water, fuel, or light, or with the means of locomotion, to deprive the community, or any substantial portion of the community, of the essentials of life...

Upon a proclamation, Parliament must meet within five days and the act gave His Majesty in Council, by Order, to make regulations to secure the 'essentials of life to the community' and gave the relevant Secretaries of State the power for the 'preservation of the peace' and the 'essentials of life' as defined above. Such regulations would be laid before Parliament as soon as they were pronounced and would expire in seven days, unless Parliament decided otherwise, of being laid before Parliament. A proclamation of this sort could be in force for no more than one month.

Anyone who broke these regulations, the act says:

...shall be imprisonment with or without hard labour for a term of three months, or a fine of one hundred pounds, or both such imprisonment and fine, together with the forfeiture of any goods or money in respect of which the offence has been committed.

The act forbade regulations which amounted to 'compulsory military service or industrial conscription' and ruled out regulations which would forbid 'any person or persons to take part in a strike, or peacefully to persuade any other person or persons to take part in a strike'. Regulations could not allow punishment by either fine or imprisonment without trial.

== Use ==
The act was first put into use in 1921 when the Triple Alliance (a predecessor of the TUC) was requested by the Miners' Federation of Great Britain to join a strike over a wage dispute. The Lloyd George government declared a state of emergency and sent troops to the striking miners' areas. On 15 April the partners in the Triple Alliance declined to join the strike, which became known as 'Black Friday'.

The Labour Prime Minister Ramsay MacDonald was tempted to use the act in 1924 when the dockers and tramwaymen went on strike. The act was extensively used during the General Strike of 1926, after a state of emergency was proclaimed on 30 April 1926 on account of the "cessation of work in coal mines" and emergency regulations were promulgated therewith and continued in force long after the general strike had ceased. The use of the act has been described as instrumental in the successful resolution of the strike in the government's favour.

Also, during 1948 and 1949 there were lengthy unofficial strikes, particularly in the docks, so the Labour Attlee government implemented this act to proclaim a state of emergency and used soldiers as strike-breakers by getting them to unload boats in London, Liverpool and Avonmouth. The Conservative government used the act during the 1955 rail strike and it was also used by Labour under Harold Wilson during the seamen's strike of 1966.

During the Conservative government of Edward Heath there were five declarations of emergency under this act, by far the most any government. The first was in July 1970 over a dockers strike, the second in December 1970 over an electricians strike, the third in February 1972 over a miners strike, the fourth in August 1972 over another dockers strike and the fifth time in October 1973, which lasted for four months.

In the total time it was on the statute book this act was used twelve times, the last time being in 1974 and mainly used in times of industrial unrest (i.e. strikes).

This act was amended by the Emergency Powers Act 1964 and superseded by the Civil Contingencies Act 2004.

== Form of proclamation ==
The proclamation of emergency made under the act in the case of the General Strike was as follows:

Whereas by the Emergency Powers Act 1920, it is enacted that if it appears to Us that any action has been taken or is immediately threatened by any persons or body of persons of such a nature and on so extensive a scale as to be calculated, by interfering with the supply and distribution of food, water, fuel, or light, or with the means of locomotion, to deprive the community or any substantial portion of the community, of the essentials of life, We may, by Proclamation, declare that a state of emergency exists: And whereas the present immediate threat of cessation of work in Coal Mines does, in Our opinion, constitute a state of emergency within the meaning of the said Act: Now, therefore, in pursuance of the said Act, We do, by and with the advice of Our Privy Council, hereby declare that a state of emergency exists. Given at Our Court at Buckingham Palace, this Thirtieth day of April, in the year of our Lord one thousand nine hundred and twenty-six, and in the Sixteenth year of Our Reign.

== In popular culture ==
The second episode of Ken Loach's series Days of Hope (1975) is set during the use of the emergency powers in 1921 in the Durham coalfield. The army are shown as using their powers to harass suspected Communists and their families, and to confiscate food sent as donations to feed striking miners.

In Episode 5 of Season 3 of The Crown, Lord Louis Mountbatten cites the Emergency Powers Act 1920 in the scene in which he meets with organizers of a possible coup d'état against the then Prime Minister, Harold Wilson. On the occasion, he considers the Queen's powers and role vis-à-vis society, the Armed Forces and the legal system in a possible proclamation of national emergency to be central to the success of his plans.
