= Emergency Powers Act (Northern Ireland) 1926 =

Act of the Parliament of Northern Ireland

- Act of Parliament
- Parliament of Northern Ireland
- Long title: An Act to make provision for the protection of the community in Northern Ireland in cases of emergency.
- Citation: 16 & 17 Geo. 5. c. 8 (N.I.)
- Territorial extent: Northern Ireland

Dates
- Royal assent: 6 May 1926
- Commencement: 6 May 1926

Other legislation
- Amended by: Emergency Powers (Amendment) Act (Northern Ireland) 1964
- Repealed by: Civil Contingencies Act 2004
- Relates to: Emergency Powers Act 1920

Status: Repealed

Emergency Powers (Amendment) Act (Northern Ireland) 1964
- Act of Parliament
- Parliament of Northern Ireland
- Long title: An Act to amend the Emergency Powers Act (Northern Ireland) 1926.
- Citation: 1964 c. 34 (N.I.)
- Territorial extent: Northern Ireland

Dates
- Royal assent: 17 December 1964

Other legislation
- Repealed by: Civil Contingencies Act 2004

Status: Repealed

The Emergency Powers Act (Northern Ireland) 1926 (16 & 17 Geo. 5. c. 8 (N.I.)) was an act of the Parliament of Northern Ireland that was passed for the purpose of making provision for the protection of the community in Northern Ireland in cases of emergency.

== Provisions ==
The act gave the Governor of Northern Ireland the authority to declare a state of emergency and issue proclamations if:

...at any time it appears to the Governor of Northern Ireland that any action has been taken or is immediately threatened by any persons or body of persons of such a nature and on so extensive a scale as to be calculated, by interfering with the supply and distribution of food, water, fuel, or light, or with the means of locomotion, to deprive the community in Northern Ireland, or any substantial portion of that community, of the essentials of life...

Proclamations of emergency would be in force until the Governor themselves revoked it. The Governor, by Order in the Privy Council of Northern Ireland, would also issue regulations to secure the 'essentials of life to the community' and give powers to the relevant Minister of the government of Northern Ireland to also secure essentials, as defined above.

Regulations had to be laid before Parliament as soon as they were issued and could not be used to 'make it an offence for any person or persons to take part in a strike, or peacefully to persuade any other person or persons to take part in a strike' or take away trials. The maximum punishment for breaking a regulation would be prison 'with or without hard labour, for a term of three months, or a fine of one hundred pounds, or both such imprisonment and fine, together with the forfeiture of any goods or money in respect of which the offence has been committed'. Regulations could also be revised or added to.

The act was amended by the Emergency Powers (Amendment) Act (Northern Ireland) 1964 (c. 34 (N.I.)).

On 19 May 1974 Merlyn Rees, the then Secretary of State for Northern Ireland, signed a proclamation of a state of emergency in the region under the amended act, following the outbreak of the Ulster Workers' Council strike which eventually led to the collapse of the Sunningdale Agreement.

The act was repealed by the Civil Contingencies Act 2004.

== Further developments ==
The enactment of an equivalent measure to the 1926 act for Northern Ireland is now a reserved matter.

== See also ==
- Emergency Powers Act 1920
