= Lockdown Files =

2023 COVID-19 news story in the UK

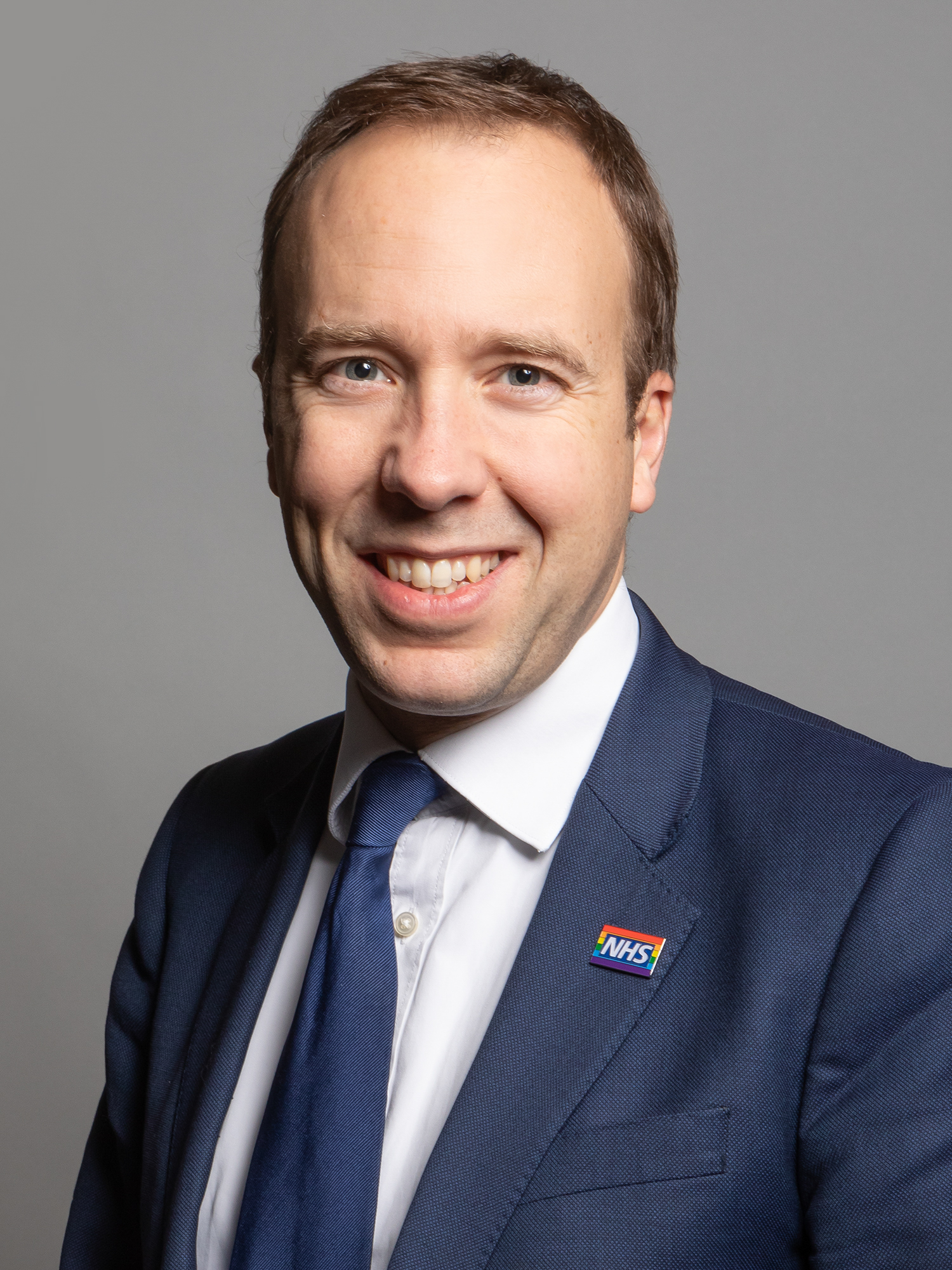
The messages were given to Isabel Oakeshott by Matt Hancock to help write his book. His details were included in stories.

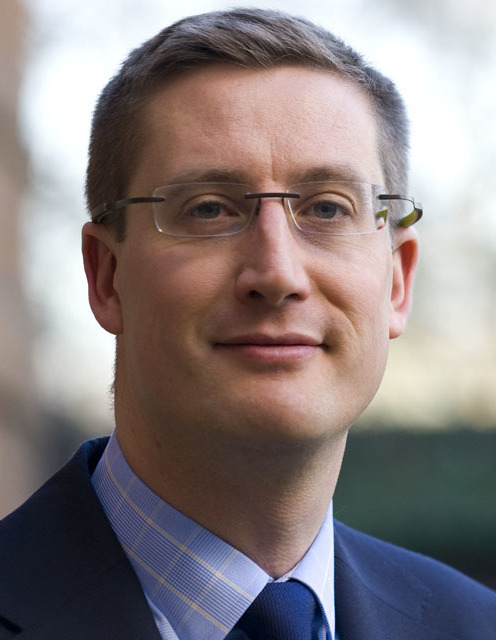
Many messages reported were between Permanent Secretary in Number 10, Simon Case and Hancock

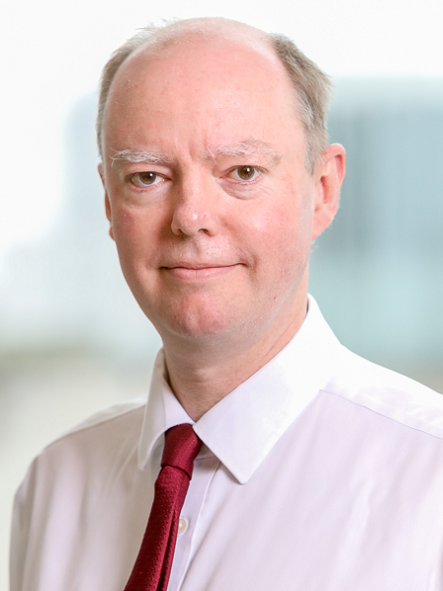
Messages included details of Chief Scientific Adviser, Chris Whitty's advice to the government

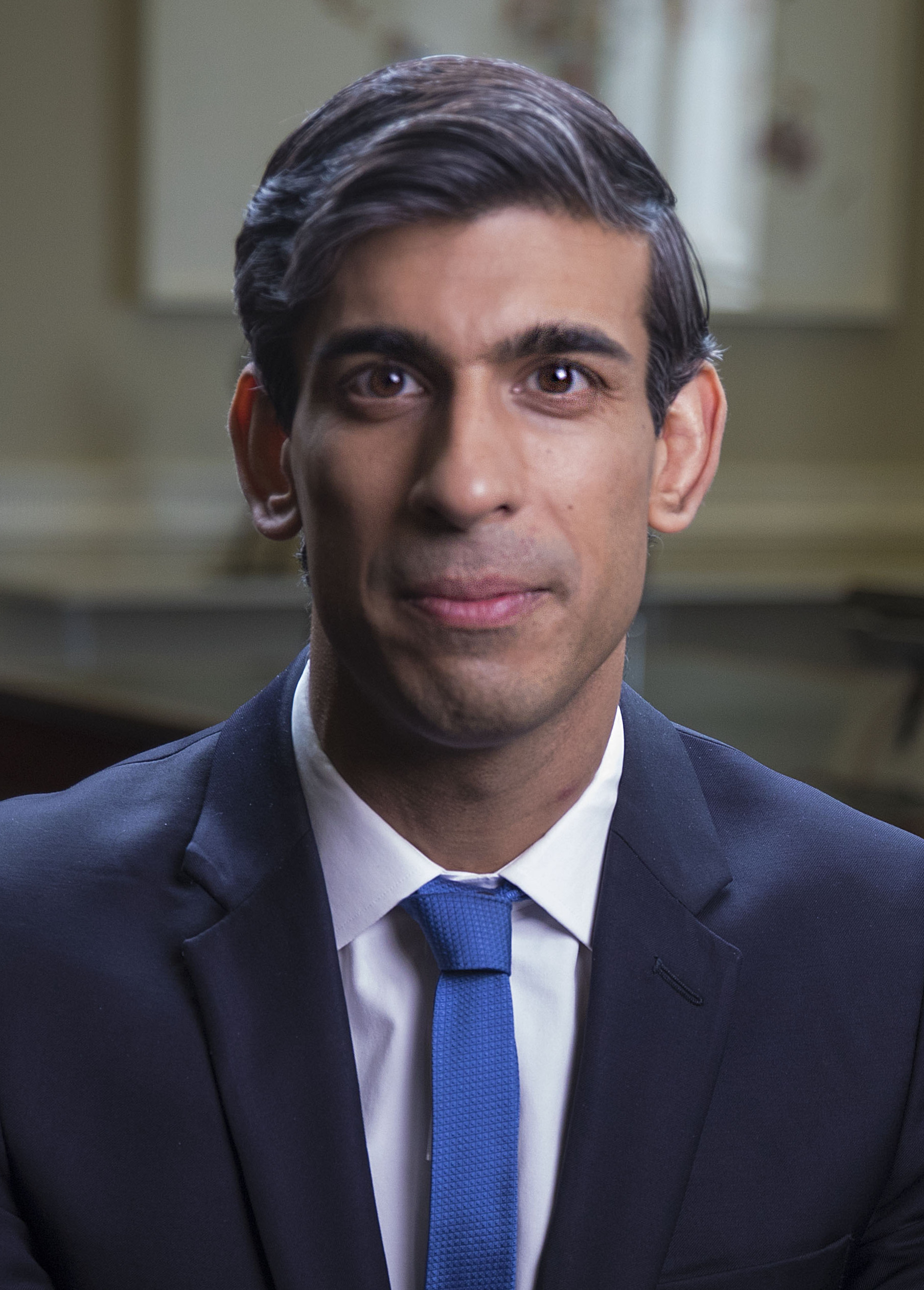
Messages revealed disagreement in policy between Hancock and then Chancellor Rishi Sunak

People mentioned in the Lockdown Files series

The Lockdown Files are a series of articles in The Daily Telegraph containing evidence, analysis, speculation, and opinion relating to more than 100,000 WhatsApp messages obtained from former health secretary Matt Hancock that were leaked to them.

The material, relating to the COVID-19 lockdown in the United Kingdom, was given to The Telegraph by Isabel Oakeshott, who had worked with Hancock on his book Pandemic Diaries. Oakeshott said that the release of these messages was motivated by the slow pace of the UK COVID-19 Inquiry and her concern that the findings might be a "whitewash", citing public money being used in legal action to redact the names of officials.

== Articles about COVID-19 response ==
The Telegraph argue that some messages show an intent on the part of Hancock and several members of his team to cause fear in the general public through their messaging in order ensure compliance with public health policy. In response to public rumours about coming local lockdowns following a local lockdown in Leicester, special adviser Jamie Njoku-Goodwin commented that the rumours were not unhelpful since a fear of a local lockdown would encourage individuals to be responsible.

The Telegraph reported that alpha variant was implicated as a cause for higher cases in Kent on December 10, 2020, following a 48-hour rapid investigation. They reported that the variant had been sequenced in September and that a report was created into what was known during this period delivered as "advice to ministers" to avoid freedom of information requests. In December 2020 Hancock and his media advisor Damon Poole discuss when to "deploy" information about a new variant and its likely effect on the right-wing press, behaviour change among the public, and London mayor Sadiq Khan. In January 2021, secretary to the prime minister, Simon Case, said that fear and guilt were vital factor in messaging.

The introduction of face masks in schools during the COVID-19 pandemic took place after then-prime minister Boris Johnson was told it was "not worth an argument" with the then-First Minister of Scotland Nicola Sturgeon, who had implemented the policy, despite then-chief medical officer saying there were no very strong reasons to implement masking.

The Telegraph reported that in November 2020, Chris Whitty and other government advisors were in favour of trialing five days of COVID testing as an alternative to 14-days of self-isolation for those who had come into contact with a person infected with COVID-19. The Telegraph reported that Hancock disagreed with this policy because it appeared like a loosening of rules and would suggest that the government had been wrong. When interviewed about the matter on GB News, Conservative MP Jacob Rees-Mogg said that the matter was not briefed to the Cabinet, and that had he known he would have opposed the measures.

Hancock instructed an aide to contact the Home Office to ask them to investigate if Nigel Farage had violated travel quarantine rules in response to a news story showing Farage at a pub in July 2020. The Telegraph said that messages show Ministers and civil servants discussing "[getting] heavy with the police" to enforce lockdown measures with senior police officers being brought into Number 10 to be told to be stricter with the public.

=== Care homes ===
The Telegraph reported that in messages Hancock had said that one of the reasons for the discharge of hospital patients into care homes without testing in the spring of 2020 was that this testing would "get in the way" of targets of administering one hundred thousand COVID tests a day as part of the NHS testing program. A spokesperson for Hancock said that the story spun about care homes was completely wrong and that the records show that Hancock had pushed for testing and that records related to this had been releasted to the COVID-19 inquiry.

The Telegraph reported that 100 care homes said that they did not want COVID-19 tests when offered, including 10 that were worried that the tests would detect staff who had asymptomatic infections.

Public health academic, Devi Sridar, writing in The Guardian contrasts her work based on data with Hancock's that she says appears to be based on politics, citing care home decision-making as an example.

== Lab leak theory ==
The Telegraph reported that Hancock's book, Pandemic Diaries, was censored by the Cabinet Office to remove Hancock's opinion on the lab leak theory and its need for investigation. They report that Hancock had wanted to say that the Chinese government's explanation - that the virus being found near the Wuhan Institute of Virology was coincidental - "just doesn't fly", and that fear of the Chinese Government must not prevent research into what happened. Hancock was told that differing from this narrative would risk damaging national security.

== Articles about politics ==
The Telegraph said that the messages show disagreements between the Chancellor of the Exchequer, Rishi Sunak, and Hancock over policy. They said Hancock messaged Sunak, "Stop your 'allies' from briefing against me" and complained that the Treasury was briefing against Hancock's policies. The Telegraph said there were disagreements about the wording of advice to businesses when restrictions were reduced in June 2020 and businesses were required to keep record of customers, with Sunak and Alok Sharma disagreeing with Hancock and Case.

The Telegraph reported that there are messages between Allan Nixon, a parliamentary Advisor and Hancock discuss threatening to cancel projects in MPs constituencies if MPs did not support the local lockdown tiers legislation in November 2020. The Telegraph reported that as part of trying to stop MPs from rebelling the whips compiled a spreadsheet of 95 MPs who disagreed with this policy and the reasons for disagreeing with reasons given related to lack of parliamentary scrutinny, economic harm, harms to hospital, absence of cost benefit analysis and the policy being "unconservative". MP Jake Berry, when interviewed about the matter said that the plan to threaten MPs was completely unacceptable and that he would have made details public if he was aware of it and was. MP James Daly said that he was appalled and disgusted that the disability hub in his constituency had been discussed as a way of coercing him. Daly said that no such threat was made.

The Telegraph reported that Hancock discussed removing Jeremy Farrar, from Scientific Advisory Group for Emergencies because he publicly commented on the Government's COVID policy and decision to close Public Health England.

== People with released messages ==
Messages reported about in the Lockdown Files include those by:

- Boris Johnson, then prime minister
- Rishi Sunak, then Chancellor of the Exchequer
- Matt Hancock, Health Secretary
- Dominic Cummings, then Chief Adviser to the Prime Minister
- Simon Case, Principal Private Secretary to the Prime Minister of the United Kingdom
- Gina Coladangelo, an aide employed by Hancock who was involved in an extramarital affair with Hancock
- Damon Poole, Hancock's media advisor
- Jamie Njoku-Goodwin, media special advisor
- George Osborne, a former Chancellor of the Exchequer from whom Matt Hancock received advice. Osborne was also the editor of the London Evening Standard; Hancock tried to get Osborne to publish favourable stories about him in the paper.
- Michael Gove, then Chancellor of the Duchy of Lancaster
- Dido Harding, Executive chair of NHS Test and Trace
- Patrick Vallance, Chief Government Scientific Advisor
- Chris Whitty, Chief medical officer
- Allan Nixon, Department of Health Parliamentary Special Adviser
- Helen Whately, Minister of for Social Care

People mentioned in messages

- Alok Sharma, then Secretary of State for Business and Trade
- James Daly, Member of Parliament for Bury North
- Nigel Farage, Former leader of UK Independence Party
- Piers Morgan, Journalist

== Response ==
Jonn Elledge in the New Statesman said that the initial revelations were unsurprising but confirmed what most people would suspect. He comments that readers should be appalled by aspects of governance revealed by the Lockdown Files such as the attitude revealed of the prime minister, ministers and surrounding media culture but that in light of previous government policies it is unsurprising.

Writing in The Guardian, Zoe Williams said that the Lockdown Files are not the way to hold the Government to account, arguing that questions about funds were more important than the Telegraph's interest in the trade offs of lockdown, or whether Hancock broke lockdown rules.

Andrew Roberts in The Spectator, said that the Lockdown Files will be a very useful source for historians comparing them to diaries. He said future who will probably kill a kinder assessment of the government.

The material was reported in French newspaper, Les Echos, and German newspaper, Der Tagesspiegel.

=== Lockdown and governance ===
The Wall Street Journal said that the story revealed how easily emergency powers to protect people's health could bleed into personal ambition for the politicians involved and that science was contorted to impose the most onerous peacetime restrictions in history, explaining some of the demands of lockdown skeptics.

Jonathan Sumption said that the Lockdown Files show that Hancock's actions during governance were driven by vanity. He said that the files indicates that Boris Johnson was aware of the totalitarian implications of restrictions but was manipulated by those around him who were concerned with public relations, lacking the "application" to get to the bottom of scientific evidence.

=== Release of material ===
Matt Hancock said that the messages were doctored and spun to support an anti-lockdown narrative. A spokesperson for Hancock said they had not been approached in advance of the publication of Lockdown Files stories. Hancock argued that there was no public interest case for releasing the messages because the material had been released to the Inquiry. A spokesperson for Hancock said that he was considering all legal options and accused Oakeshott of breaking a non-disclosure agreement.

Elledge of the New Statesman comments on the fact that the Telegraph chose what to publish, arguing that the Telegraph had an anti-lockdown agenda. He gives Allison Pearson's comments in a Telegraph podcast, "Planet Normal", as evidence of this agenda.

Ian Dunt, in the I newspaper, argued that Oakeshott was pursuing an anti-lockdown agenda and had violated a journalistic moral principle by releasing information about her source when hired by Hancock to work on his book. Addressing the question of profession ethics of the release, David Banks writes in The Guardian, that the Editors Code of Practice places a moral responsibility on journalists to not disclose confidential sources, but notes that this rule tends to be more applied to people who fear being identified such as whistleblowers.

Writing in The Spectator, Fraser Nelson argued that the British public had a right to know about the information in the Lockdown Files. In the Telegraph, Julia Hartley-Brewer argued that "no journalist worth their salt" could disagree with the public interest case for the release of these files, suggesting that those criticising the release were motivated by their support for lockdown policies and that such releases were necessitated by journalists who failed to apply sufficient scrutiny to the decision-making and scientific discourse during the lockdown. Andy Cowper, an editor at The British Medical Journal, said that the stories give a remarkable glimpse into how Hancock and his team conducted themselves in office and that Oakeshott had done a public service by bringing to our attention the low standard of governance during the pandemic.

Sonia Sodha, in the Guardian, argued that there needs to rapid reviews of decision making during COVID-19 due to the length of the Covid-19 Inquiry. She said that the Telegraph's narrative could mask discussion of the trade offs of lockdown based on the values of citizens, and that delaying inquiry into the lockdown would allow "ideologues" to fill the gap created by the absence of review.

=== Inquiry ===
Oakeshott said that the release of these messages was motivated by the slow pace of the UK Covid-19 Inquiry and her concern that the findings might be a "whitewash", citing public money being used in legal action to redact the names of officials. Not directly addressing Oakshott, Heather Hallett the chair of the public inquiry said that it was unhelpful to compare the UK inquiry to other countries because of its broad terms of reference and statutary powers to obtain evidence. She said there would be "no whitewash".

Labour MP Graham Stringer called for a short-term inquiry into Covid-19 in light of information contained in the lockdown files and the likely duration of the existing enquiry.

== See also ==
- Failures of State
