= Failures of State =

2021 book about the COVID-19 pandemic in the UK

Failures of State: The Inside Story of Britain's Battle with Coronavirus
- Author: George Arbuthnott; Jonathan Calvert
- Language: English
- Subject: COVID-19 pandemic in the United Kingdom
- Genre: Investigative journalism, non-fiction, politics
- Published: 2021
- Publisher: Mudlark/HarperCollins
- Publication place: United Kingdom

Failures of State: The Inside Story of Britain's Battle with Coronavirus is a 2021 book by George Arbuthnott and Jonathan Calvert about the COVID-19 pandemic in the United Kingdom. The book is adapted from Calvert and Arbuthnott's reporting on the pandemic for The Sunday Times. It focuses on responses of the British government and National Health Service to the onset of the pandemic.

== Content ==
Failures of State covers the COVID-19 pandemic in the United Kingdom and the British government's response from the onset of the pandemic in January 2020 to early 2021. It begins with the initial outbreak in mainland China, accusing the Chinese government of covering up the outbreak and also expresses support for the lab leak theory. It suggests that the British government underestimated the threat of the virus in early 2020, inadequately preparing and responding slowly to the outbreak, leading to shortages of PPE and linking the slow response to a high death toll compared to other nations. The book is particularly critical of the leadership of Prime Minister Boris Johnson during the crisis. This includes his non-attendance of five COBR briefings during early 2020, and suggests that he and others in the government were preoccupied with Brexit in early 2020. It also explores the strain the pandemic had on the National Health Service and Britain's health care system. They also accuse the government of disinformation in their response to the authors' reporting during the pandemic.

== Reception ==
Jonathon Freedland in The Guardian described the book as a "damning assessment" of the government's handling of the pandemic and "this is the book to throw at those who were meant to protect the British public and failed in their duty". Christina Patterson in The Times described it as "a gripping, devastating read" and "a piece of first-class investigative journalism", although noting at times "the tone falters". In The Scotsman, Elsa Maishman commended the author's journalism and research, concluding "It isn’t a book to be read peacefully before bedtime, but it is not one to be missed". Former health secretary Alan Johnson also reviewed Failures of State for The Observer.'s book of the week.
