= Emergency State (book) =

2022 book by Adam Wagner

- Author: Adam Wagner
- Language: English
- Subject: COVID-19 lockdown in the United Kingdom
- Publisher: The Bodley Head of Penguin Random House
- Publication date: 2022
- Publication place: United Kingdom
- Pages: 222
- ISBN: 978-1-847-92746-0

Emergency State: How We lost Our Freedoms in the Pandemic and Why it Matters is a book by UK human rights lawyer Adam Wagner. The book explores how the UK government during the COVID-19 pandemic and associated Government response had unprecedented powers to make and change legislation at will without accountability and what safeguards could be created to prevent this in the future. Wagner was appointed to work on the Independent Commission on UK Public Health Emergency Powers.

In this book, Wagner argues that COVID-19 restrictions in the United Kingdom brought the country as close to a police state as in living memory. Wagner makes suggestions in response to events during the pandemic including suggesting a review of the fixed penalty notices and other penalties issues during COVID-19 lockdown in the United Kingdom, for a codified constitution in the United Kingdom, and for opposition members of parliament to be involved in pandemic meetings.

The book comprises a preface and nine chapters: States of Emergency, Very Strong Measures, Take It on the Chin, You Must Stay at Home, The Lockdown Bites, Patchwork Summer, The Darkest Winter, Step by Step, and Freedom Regained?. The second to eighth chapters are ordered chronologically and summarise the number of cases and deaths.

The book has notes, a list of relevant legislation, and index of cases.It provides an infographic showing how covid cases and deaths progressed during the pandemic and which restrictions were in place at these times and a timeline of restrictions.

== Contents ==
The book discusses how during existential threats states reorganize themselves in what Wagner dubs Emergency States to tackle the crisis and equates them to historic precedents. Wagner notes six properties of the emergency state, that it is "mighty" and can marshal very larger resources to a goal; that power is concentrated; that the state becomes ignorant due to the centralised decision making; that it tends to corruption; that it is self-reinforcing with people used to absolute power tending to think of excuses to keep it; the final feature is that people often want to be ruled in this manner during emergencies due to a desire for simplicity, strong leadership. Wagner argues that any society can rearrange itself towards a common cause, good or bad, drawing comparisons to the war on terror following the September 11 attacks and the Holocaust, quoting George Orwell arguing the importance of role of public opinion in influencing the laws that are enforced and created.

He notes the comparison to the ancient Roman emergency dictatorial practice of Justitium, the British State during the second world war, and Elizabethan plague orders in England for bubonic plague.

=== 1 States of Emergency ===
In the first chapter, Wagner introduces the concept of the Emergency State, the manner in which the State functions during an existential crisis such as famine, pandemic, or war drawing comparison to other historic crises.

=== 2 Very Strong Measures ===
Wagner notes that most modern states have legislation to allow emergency powers where constitutional protections for fundamental rights can be suspended. He cites the case of Liversidge v Anderson where the House of Lords Judges ruled that the Home Secretary need not provide any reason for their decision to indefinitely detain someone for that decision to be reasonable.

Wagner traces the history of the emergency powers in the Public Health Act to the SARS outbreak of 2002, after which the World Health Organization had encouraged states to create emergency legislation. He notes that there was concern about the breadth of powers during parliamentary debate at the time of reading.

Wagner traces the history of lockdowns, arguing that while social distancing has a long history national lockdowns are new. He draws comparisons to plague orders in England during outbreaks of the bubonic plague, and notes that Sierra Leone had a three-day lockdown in response to Ebola in 2014.

=== 3 Take It on the Chin ===
Wagner discusses the history of the European Court of Human Rights, ECHR, as a means to stop the slide into authoritarianism. He cites Pierre-Henri Teitgen, a founder of the ECHR as arguing that the risk authoritarianism was not appreciated before its rise in the 1900s, and argues that at times authoritarians do not take power by force but are invited. Wagner discusses the imposition of lockdowns imposition of COVID-19 lockdowns internationally during the early period of the pandemic.

=== 4 You Must Stay at Home ===
In this chapter, Wagner discusses the imposition of lockdowns and stay-at-home orders during the early stages of the pandemic in the UK.

He argues that the lockdown regulations implemented by Matt Hancock fundamentally altered the relationship of the citizen with the state in that they only allowed certain activities rather than banning them and were 'Napoleonic' in nature. Wagner notes vagueness surrounding lockdown laws and the difference between governmental guidance the law. He discusses the issuing of fixed penalty notices, FPNs, during COVID-19, and the effects of Dominic Cummings' violation of lockdown guidance.

=== 5 The Lockdown Bites ===
This chapter discusses lockdowns effects on education. Wagner argues that lockdowns affected some such as those who were pregnant, those who lived alone, in cramped flats, without access to a garden, had abusive partners, or had ill relatives and that they widened social and ethnic inequalities. Wagner discusses the fact that COVID amounted to a ban on sexual relations for those who did not cohabit, arguing that it was ironic that Matt Hancock who approved most covid measures resigned due to having an extramarital affair with an aide in the workplace.

=== 6 Patchwork Summer ===
This chapter discusses lockdowns during the summer of 2020. It gives the example of a local lockdown in Leicester that was imposed and enforced before the legislation approving local lockdowns had been published. Wagner notes that legislation surrounding COVID-19 restrictions changed very quickly, with the laws on averaging changing once a week, and the chaotic way in which the government communicated legislation. He draws parallels to the covid regulations and the concept of a "dog law" used by Jeremy Bentham, a law that it is impossible to know or follow ahead of time. Wagner discusses the prosecution of protests against lockdowns and the ethics surrounding the right to protest during pandemics.

=== 7 The Darkest Winter ===
In this chapter Wagner discusses the Winter of 2020–2021. Wagner discusses rules to quarantine in hotels, and legal challenges to emergency legislation brought by Simon Dolan.

Wagner discusses an exception to covid regulations made that allowed hunting and grouse shooting. This is given an example of a form of banal corruption that could have arisen from Covid Operations Cabinet Committee having so much power. The Committee consisted of four members Boris Johnson, Michael Gove, Rishi Sunak and Matt Hancock as well as a few other key officials. Wagner equates this the Hannah Arendt's concept of banal evil where officials claim to just follow orders.

=== 8 Step by Step ===
This chapter discusses vaccination against covid and the use of vaccine passports, issues surrounding the policing of the vigil for Sarah Everard, who had been murdered by a police officer, and the emergence of partygate, the revelation that a number of illegal gatherings had taken place in the houses of parliament during lockdown.

=== 9 Freedom Regained? ===
In the concluding chapter, Wagner argues that Boris Johnson's government saw democracy as an inconvenience. Wagner argues government was able to take over rule from parliament for two years due to a submissive parliament, weak legal protections, politicians who saw democratic process as an inconvenience, and lacked integrity. Wagner notes his lack of scientific qualifications but argues that some form of social distancing is still unavoidable during the initial stages of pandemics.

Wagner argues that the Public Health Act is a flawed piece of legislation allowing government to legislate without accountability, noting that the Civil Contingencies Act 2004 still gives the government immense power while providing Parliament more scrutiny both in terms of the timeliness of review at the ability for parliament to amend legislation. Wagner contrasts the United Kingdom legislation to Scotland, Sweden, Finland, New Zealand and Singapore as providing more scrutiny of measures.

He notes a process of "follow the science", where decisions were taken but COVID-19 Cabinet Committees based on advice from the Strategic Advisory Group of Experts presided over by four ministers which were highly secretive.

Wagner offers four suggestions to reduce the power of the Emergency State. Firstly, that the powers of the Public Health Act should be limited in the same way as the civil contingencies act, secondly that all prosecutions and fixed penalty notices issues under COVID regulation should be reviewed, thirdly that there should be a codified constitution, and lastly that human rights should form a central part of decision making during emergencies.

== Reception ==
Reviewers said that the book was a definitive regarding, and the 'fullest account' of, law during the pandemic. Benjamin Seifert of The Law Society Gazette, said that the book was the definitive guide to the law during the pandemic and would serve an important historical account and notes Wagner's perspective as a human rights lawyer and how his role in the Reclaim These Streets legal cases give him a first hand perspective. Former UK Supreme Court Judge, Jonathan Sumption, reviewing the book in The Daily Telegraph, said that book is the 'fullest account' of how the government used legal coercion to restrict basic human freedoms.

Critics commented on Wagner not assessing on the merits of lockdown restrictions. Sumption felt Wagner was qualified to do so and that human rights lawyers had a role in protecting basic freedoms. Stephen Bush, of the Financial Times, felt that the book should justify lockdowns for fear that readers might view the loss of human rights as justifying the absence of restrictions in future pandemics. Reviewing in The Critic, Yuan Yi Zhu describes Wagner's lack of comment on the merits as "narrow proceduralism", accusing Wagner of trying to criticise lockdown regulation procedurally while avoiding the public criticism of being seen to criticise the policy. Quentin Letts commented on the books failure to consider the role of the media in lockdowns.

Sumption and Yuan Yi Zhu argue that critique of parliamentary process are not important because of the popularity of lockdown policies and the fact that the opposition supported tougher measures.

Jonathan Sumption argues that an attitude of refusing to form opinions due to a claim lack of expertise, as applied by Wagner in the book, contributed to the publics acceptance of restrictions and if applied in the future would result in sacrificing humanity to technocrats. Bush comments that the situations that resulted in "Covid states" is near certain to happen again and that the book is a vital contribution to a debate about how to ensure the next pandemic does not damage the democratic model. Robert Low of The Jewish Chronicle says that it is hard to disagree with the books conclusions that the UK came as close to a police state as in living memory.

Quentin Letts, reviewing the book in The Times, said that it did not "quite sing" but made valid points. He comments that Wagner's tone is self-righteous and notes the absence of commentary of the media during the lockdowns who he considers complicit in stricter lockdown measures.

== See also ==
- Human rights issues related to the COVID-19 pandemic
