= Can you look them in the eyes? =

UK government COVID-19 public health slogan

- Agency: MullenLowe
- Market: United Kingdom
- Language: English
- Running time: 1
- Release date: 22 January 2021; 5 years ago
- Slogan: Can you look them in the eyes?

"Can you look them in the eyes?" was a 2021 public health campaign of the British government during the COVID-19 pandemic, designed to encourage the public to follow COVID restrictions. It was launched in January 2021 across radio and television, as well as in other media.

== Overview ==
Produced by the advertising agency MullenLowe, and filmed at Basingstoke and North Hampshire Hospital, the campaign featured adverts showing close-up facial shots of a number of doctors, healthcare workers and COVID patients wearing oxygen masks, and asked people if they could "look them in the eyes" and tell them they were doing everything they can to stop the spread of the virus, while urging the public not to leave home unless for essential reasons. Media, including EuroWeekly News described it as "the hardest hitting ad campaign ever", and a change in tone from previous UK public health campaigns during the pandemic. In addition to these adverts, a short film featured one-on-one interviews with staff working at Basingstoke and North Hampshire Hospital in which they discussed their experiences looking after patients with COVID.

The campaign's launch occurred a few weeks after England had entered a third period of national lockdown in an attempt to control an ongoing increase in the number of daily cases of the virus, and deaths linked to it. The adverts first appeared on television on 22 January 2021, airing during commercial breaks on ITV and Channel 4. The campaign was subsequently rolled out to other media, including radio and social media platforms, the following day.

== Reception ==
Kate Magee, of Campaign, observed that the campaign was aimed at two groups of people – those who bend the rules and those who ignore them because they do not believe they are at risk, but questioned whether the campaign would be effective in reaching these groups, or whether it was instead more likely just to terrify those already following the rules. EuroWeekly News noted that British Prime Minister Boris Johnson had recently attracted criticism for what it described as "scaremongering" and suggested he was likely to do so again because of the nature of the campaign.

Writing for Spiked magazine, Philip Hammond cited the campaign as an example of the public being "nudged" into compliance with COVID regulations, with the campaign targeted at those who felt complacency for the rules. In The Spectator, Douglas Murray cited it as an example of people being shamed into compliance, and suggested the campaign was "deemed to be a good utilisation of shame".

== Legacy ==
In May 2022, and following the publication of the Gray Report into the Partygate scandal which had seen several gatherings held at Downing Street and other government venues during the various lockdowns in England, The Drum website reported that the Labour Party had bought up the advertising space on the ConservativeHome website in what was described as an ad takeover. The ads featured an image of a mask-wearing nurse with the text "Look into her eyes and tell her you still back Boris Johnson".
