= Adam Wagner =

British barrister

Adam Wagner is a Doughty Street Chambers barrister, a member of the Equality and Human Rights Commission's panel of counsel.

In 2019 he represented the Campaign Against Antisemitism (CAA) in its case a formal investigation under section 20 of the Equality Act 2006 into whether the Labour Party had "unlawfully discriminated against, harassed or victimised people because they are Jewish".

He is a specialist in human rights and public law, including COVID-19 lockdown rules. He wrote a book, Emergency State, which discusses human rights during the pandemic.
