= Counter disinformation unit =

The Counter disinformation unit, now known as the National Security and Online Information Team (NSOIT), leads the UK's governments response to misinformation and disinformation. It states that it analyses public available information and does not collect non-public information. The unit was established in 2019. Between 2020 and 2023, the unit commissioned reports from the Artificial intelligence firm Logically. The unit was run by civil servant, Sarah Connolly.

The CDU states it responds to narratives by rebutting social media posts, flagging posts, or promotion of public health campaigns. The response also included downranking posts.

Prominent critics of the United Kingdom responses to the COVID-19 pandemic were monitored by the unit. Epidemiologist Carl Heneghan and tropical disease researcher Alexandre de Figueiredo were monitored by the unit as was Molly Kingsley who ran a campaign to keep schools open during the pandemic. Member of parliament, David Davis had his comments logged by the unit.

In 2023, the unit was renamed the National Security and Online Information Team (NSOIT), and it operates within the Department for Science, Innovation and Technology. NSOIT has appointed Crisp Thinking to help conduct analysis of social media platforms. In August 2023, the department awarded a £350,960 contract to Crisp Thinking (UK) Ltd for monitoring and analysis relating to misinformation and disinformation.

== Activities ==
In April 2024, the House of Commons Culture, Media and Sport Select Committee, in its report Trusted voices, criticised the lack of transparency and accountability of the unit and recommended that the government commission an independent review of its activities and strategy, reporting back within 12 months. Following the July 2024 general election, oversight of NSOIT passed to Peter Kyle, Secretary of State for Science, Innovation and Technology. During the 2024 United Kingdom riots, the unit was tasked with monitoring online activity related to the unrest. Ofcom concluded in October 2024 that there had been a "clear connection" between social media posts and violence during the riots.

In a written parliamentary answer in March 2025, Minister Feryal Clark stated that NSOIT's remit was to analyse narratives and trends in publicly available online information relating to national security and public safety where ministers considered there to be a high risk of misinformation or disinformation affecting UK audiences. Ministers have stated that the team's work focuses on threats posed by foreign states, risks to elections, and risks arising from artificial intelligence and deepfakes.

== Criticism ==
Silkie Carlo, director of Big Brother Watch, said the concept of a central authority determining incorrect information is open to abuse and should be considered carefully. David Davis called for the unit to be shut down and a government investigation initiated.

Ministers have been criticized and questioned over the lack of transparency, however, the information that protected as a matter of national security.

Michelle Donelan reportedly made several attempts to have the unit disbanded during her tenure as Secretary of State for Digital, Culture, Media and Sport and later at the Department for Science, Innovation and Technology, citing concerns about its implications for free speech.
