= George Arbuthnott =

British investigative journalist

George Arbuthnott is a British investigative journalist at The Sunday Times.

Arbuthnott read economics at Durham University (2005–08) and completed a master's degree in investigative journalism at City, University of London (2008–09).

His work helped prompt the Modern Slavery Bill and expose a global doping scandal in athletics. Arbuthnott won young journalist of the year at the 2012 Press Awards, two British Journalism Awards in 2015, and being shortlisted for the Orwell Prize in 2015 for a piece on the modern slave trade. In 2016, he was shortlisted for the European Press Prize with 'The Fifa Scandal', and in 2019, he was a finalist at the British Journalism Awards for an investigation carried out alongside Sunday Times journalists Jonathan Calvert and Gabrial Pogrund.

He is a judge of the Amnesty International UK Media Awards.
