= Carol Black (rheumatologist) =

British physician (born 1939)

Dame Carol Black GBE FRCP
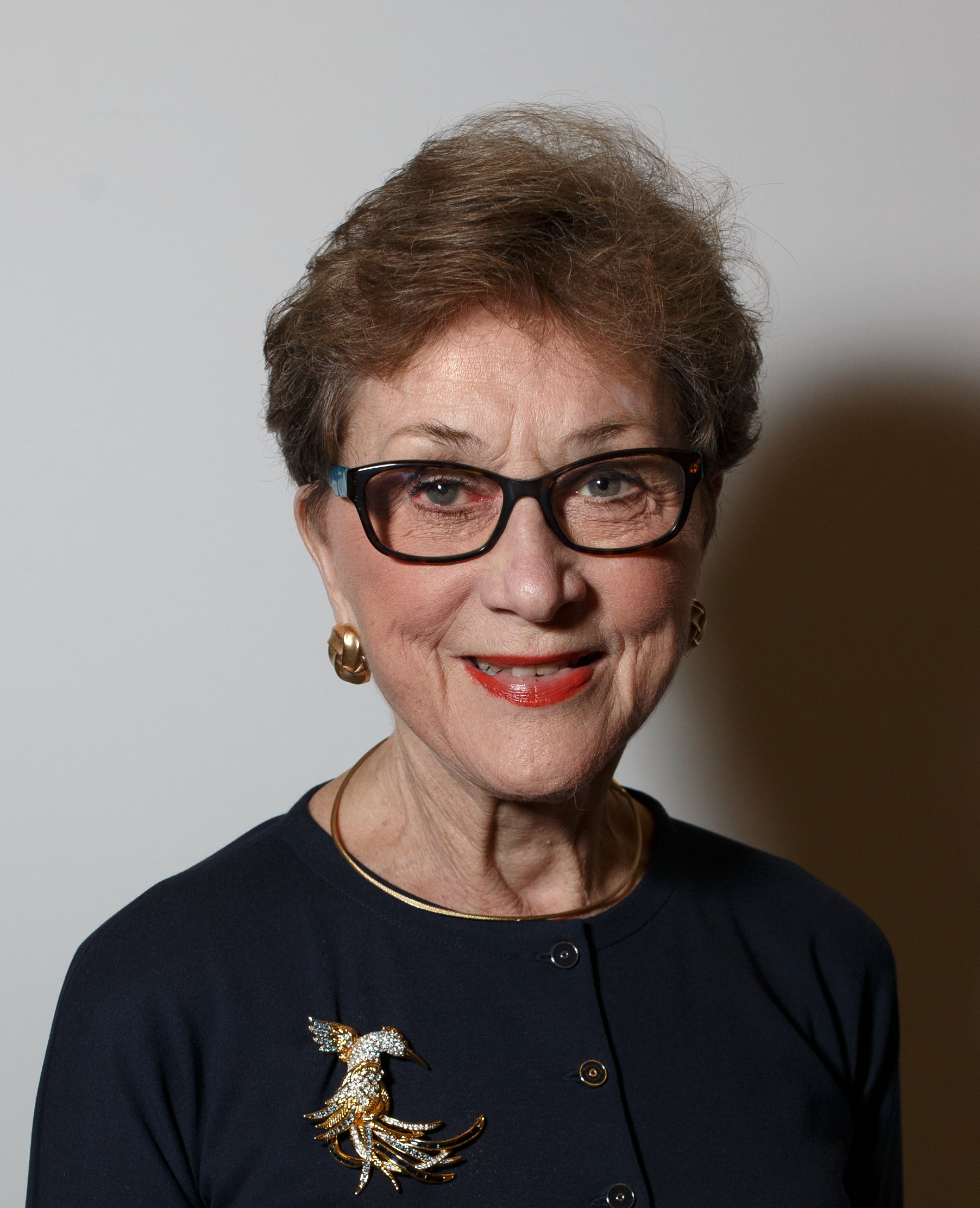
- Black in 2016
- Born: Carol Mary Black; 26 December 1939 (age 86); Barwell, Leicestershire, England
- Education: University of Bristol

Dame Carol Mary Black GBE FRCP (born 26 December 1939) is a British physician, academic, specialising in rheumatology. She was President of the Royal College of Physicians from 2002 to 2006, advised the British Government on the relationship between work and health from 2006 to 2016, and was Principal of Newnham College, Cambridge, from 2012 to 2019. She is an expert on the disease scleroderma.

== Early life and student years ==
An only child, Black was born into an unacademic family in Barwell, Leicestershire. She attended grammar school in the 1950s where she became head girl.

She studied history at the University of Bristol, graduating with a Bachelor of Arts (BA) degree in 1962. While studying at Bristol, she was elected President of the Student Union. She then worked as a schoolteacher in the Gilbert and Ellice Islands.

In 1965, Black enrolled as a mature student in the first intake of "pre-clinical" medical students to the University of Bristol, where she won prizes in surgery, obstetrics and pathology. In 1970, she graduated with Bachelor of Medicine, Bachelor of Surgery (MB ChB) degrees, at the age of 30. She obtained full registration with the General Medical Council the following year.

== Clinical training and NHS work ==
After graduating, Black stayed in Bristol to work in general hospital medicine as a junior doctor. She gained a higher degree by researching the rare skin and connective tissue disease scleroderma and in 1974 passed the Royal College of Physicians membership examination.

Black moved to Hammersmith Hospital in London the following year for specialist training. In 1981, she took up an offer of an appointment as a consultant rheumatologist at the nearby West Middlesex Hospital.

After eight years in an NHS general hospital as a consultant, Black opted for a move back into academic rheumatology by taking a job at the Royal Free teaching hospital in Hampstead, later becoming a professor and then the hospital's medical director. The rheumatology unit she established there has a strong interest in scleroderma: it is a national tertiary referral centre for patients with the illness and is the major European centre for clinical research into the disease, with a particular focus on trying to understand the pathological process of fibrosis or scarring that characterises the condition at a histological level. The unit also has a strong tradition of high-quality teaching aimed at medical students and specialists-in-training.

Black is an international expert on scleroderma. Partly as a result of her work, much can now be done to ameliorate the effects of the condition, although a specific treatment for the disease remains elusive.

== Women in medicine ==
At the age of 62, Black retired from full-time hospital work to become the President of the Royal College of Physicians in 2002.

Black's successful academic career in rheumatology, her NHS management role when she was medical director of her London teaching hospital, and her subsequent positions of influence (she chaired the Health Honours Committee between 2006 and 2009) gave Black a profile inside and outside medicine and led to her being championed by some as a leader of the profession and a role model for young women. Black was indubitably in the vanguard of the rise of women in medicine from the 1960s onwards: she became a consultant at a time when many women were entering medical school but few had become fully trained specialists, and this 'woman in a man's world' experience is something she is often asked to talk about.

However, when she was president of her royal college she made controversial comments about women in medicine, suggesting that the profession was being "feminised" and that this could make it harder to find specialists such as cardiologists in the future. To illustrate her concerns, she said that Russian doctors were poorly paid and had low status and that this was the result of having an almost entirely female workforce (rather than it being a reflection of Russian 20th century political history). She then drew a parallel between doctors and teachers, saying: "Years ago, teaching was a male-dominated profession – and look what happened to teaching". She later clarified her comments, explaining that her intention had been to warn that unless provision was made for female doctors to balance work and family life and be given extra support with childcare and flexible hours, they would tend not to enter what she called "the more demanding" branches of medicine or to serve on government committees.

She stepped down as President of the Royal College of Physicians in 2006 but still works as an adviser to the consultancy firm PwC and with the Work Foundation.

== Modernising medical careers ==
The NHS Plan published in 2000 set out the government's ambitions for the NHS. In return for a huge increase in funding, the government expected modernisation and reform.

The Modernising Medical Careers (MMC) programme was designed by the Department of Health with input from the medical profession as a way to update, streamline and accelerate the training of doctors in Britain. As part of this programme, all doctors who qualified after taking their 'finals' in 2005 began their postgraduate training with a two year foundation programme designed to teach them generic clinical and interpersonal skills, following a curriculum set by the Academy of Medical Royal Colleges that Black became the Chair of in 2006.

In February 2007, MMC hit a crisis caused by the abject failure of its online job-matching component: the Medical Training Application Service (MTAS). This led to loud criticism from within the medical profession that culminated in senior surgeons in Birmingham refusing to interview candidates recommended to them by MTAS. In response, the Department of Health announced an urgent review led by the Vice-Chair of the Academy of Medical Royal Colleges, Professor Neil Douglas. But when the review group declared that MTAS should continue, it triggered mass demonstrations by junior doctors; the London protest march was addressed by the Leader of the Opposition at the time, David Cameron, who described MTAS as "an utter shambles". Over the following weeks and months, there was a flurry of resignations of senior doctors associated with MMC, MTAS and the Douglas Review itself.

In May, Black and the Chair of the British Medical Association (BMA), James Johnson, wrote jointly to The Times endorsing the Douglas Review and the principles of MMC. Three days later, after what The Times called "widespread fury" from junior doctors, Johnson resigned as head of the BMA when his position became untenable. Black later told Parliament that the joint letter was "simply an attempt at unity which obviously did not work well. When the Douglas Review was doing its work the chairman of that body asked the Academy [of Medical Royal Colleges] and the BMA together to produce a letter which would be supportive of that review and would also correct some of the inaccuracies already in the press about it...we were supporting the principles as expounded by MMC".

The online recruitment system was subsequently discarded.

In the aftermath, the House of Commons Health Committee carried out an investigation: it criticised the leaders of the medical profession in general over the debacle and described the role of the Academy of Medical Royal Colleges as "weak and tokenistic". The Academy rejected this, saying that it did not reflect the nature of the Academy, the people in it nor the progress it had recently made.

== Work, health and sickness absence ==
In 2006, the government led by Tony Blair made Black its national director for health and work and asked her to promote its policies across Whitehall, especially within the Department of Health and the Department for Work and Pensions. She described her role as being to try to keep people "healthy, well, resilient and in work".

In March 2008, she authored Working for a healthier tomorrow, a report which focused on the impact of sickness absence on the health of the working-age population and on the economy.

The key points of the 2008 report were:

- Intervention in the early stages of an employee's sickness absence could help prevent the absence becoming a long-term one
- Managers should be flexible when an early return to work is recommended
- GPs should be "supported to adapt the advice they provide, where appropriate doing all they can to help people enter, stay in or return to work"
- The sick note should be replaced by a 'fit note' that outlines what the patient can do at work, not just what they can't do
- Occupational health services should be expanded, and more of these services should be provided by the NHS
- Occupational health services should also be made available to people who are out of work

The fit note was introduced in 2010.

Black stepped down from her national director role in 2012. She still leads the 'health at work network' at the Department of Health; through it, she is part of a drive to encourage commercial, public and third sector organisations to improve the health of their employees.

== Views on sick-notes and mental ill-health ==
In 2010, Black addressed the Fit for Work Europe organisation, of which she is a co-president (the organisation focuses on the consequences of musculoskeletal disorders when they affect people of working age). In her address, she said that the government had appointed her to her national director role because "...we had far too many people leaving the workforce with relatively mild musculoskeletal conditions, stress, anxiety, depression...and many of those people received no immediate help to keep them in the workplace...they were leaving the workplace to go into the benefits system". She also said: "If I had to summarise what we have been trying to do in the United Kingdom, it would be to say: get rid of the old system of the paper sick-note, put it in red because it's dangerous, it's not good advocacy for your patient".

The key assumption underpinning Black's thinking is that because people are living longer they will have to work longer – hence the need for more effective intervention when working people fall ill, so that they can remain in the workforce instead of retiring on medical grounds or going onto benefits.

In March 2015, Black expanded on her views in a talk to Investors in People. When outlining the common causes of sickness absence, she said: "Very often what the GP will write on a medical certificate...isn't really the truth. When I did the independent review on sickness absence for the government, I talked to lots of people who were collecting their sicknotes and what they said is: 'I hate my line manager. I'm never going back to that job'. But no GP I've ever known writes anything other than a 'medical' diagnosis; the closest they get is 'stress' or 'anxiety' – often not the truth at all". At the same time she drew a sharp distinction between what she called "real" illnesses such as "cancer", "diabetes" and "endogenous depression", and other phenomena such as "stress, anxiety, and mild depression", which she claimed were characterised by "little or no objective disease or impairment" and were "not serious illnesses". They were, she said, usually a normal human response to something like an unhealthy workplace or a poor line manager and should be handled accordingly, by tackling the original cause of the stress in the workplace, not only by addressing the individual responding to stressful circumstances.

In May 2015, Black addressed the Chartered Institute of Personnel and Development. She told the audience that mild anxiety and depression have "no objective signs. When you examine a person, you can't get an objective disease; it's not in front of you". She also appeared to suggest that because mental illnesses do not show up on scans, diagnosing them is subjective. With stress disorders and depression, she explained: "If you order an X-ray or a test, you don't get a positive result".

== Fit for work service ==
In 2011, the Coalition government asked Black to work with David Frost, the Director General of the British Chambers of Commerce, to compile another report on sickness absence. The study was sponsored jointly by the Department for Work and Pensions and the Department for Business, Innovation and Skills, and was entitled Health at work – an independent review of sickness absence. The work built on Black's 2008 report into sickness absence and explored largely the same themes.

One recommendation of the joint report was the creation of a national assessment service for off-sick employees, provided by the private sector but designed, funded and overseen by central government, which could be used by managers and employees who did not have access to their own occupational health service, as well as by GPs considering whether to issue a fit-note. This echoed ideas in Black's 2008 report, in which she also foresaw such a scheme being used to rehabilitate long-term recipients of Incapacity Benefit.

The other recommendations were:

- Further modification of the fit note to make it less job-specific
- Better management of sickness absence in the public sector
- Changes to Statutory Sick Pay administration
- The abolition of the Percentage Threshold Scheme, which compensates employers in firms with high rates of sickness absence
- A job-brokering service, to find new work for employees on long-term sick leave
- Changing sickness certification to further reduce the influence of GPs in deciding entitlement to out-of-work sickness benefits

Fit for work, the national assessment service envisaged in the report, was launched in 2015. It gives advice to employers and GPs over the telephone or online. The vast majority of employee assessments – which are voluntary – are carried out over the telephone by health professionals from a variety of backgrounds who have undergone role-specific training and are referred to as "case managers". For face-to-face assessments – expected to be undergone by only a "limited number of patients" with complex problems – the off-sick employee will need to travel for up to 90 minutes to meet their assessor.

The British Medical Association was critical of the language used by the government when describing the service. It said it was "misleading" to claim that Fit for work was offering occupational health advice and support when the emphasis was on sickness absence management and providing a focused return to work.

In October 2015, the website Personnel Today revealed that, in order to tackle "ongoing concerns within the profession" about the scheme's low profile, 'Fit For work' had "linked up with conciliation service Acas to unveil a programme of awareness-raising events around the country". The main vehicle for raising awareness about the scheme was a roadshow featuring David Frost, the co-author of Black's 2011 report, as the keynote speaker. Personnel Today also reported criticism of the narrow scope of 'Fit for work' by AXA PPP Healthcare, an existing private occupational healthcare provider. AXA's Director of Health Consulting warned that 'Fit for work' wasn't a panacea for all sickness absence issues; in particular, he pointed out that the government-funded service only covered sickness absence of four weeks or more, which would not be responsive enough to address health conditions that could benefit from earlier intervention.

In England and Wales, 'Fit for work' is operated by a division of Maximus, the global outsourcing firm that took over the running of the other, much-criticised, government-designed 'fitness for work' assessment process – the one used to judge eligibility for out-of-work sickness benefits – when Atos Healthcare quit that contract prematurely in March 2015.

== Health and social security ==
=== Independent Review of Drugs ===
On 8 February 2019 Professor Dame Carol Black was appointed to lead a major 2-part independent review that will look into the ways in which drugs are fuelling serious violence; and treatment, recovery and prevention.

=== Work capability assessment ===
One conclusion of Black's 2011 report concerned the sickness benefits system. Black felt that too many claims for the out-of-work sickness benefit Employment and Support Allowance (ESA) did not meet the threshold for eligibility, yet a Work Capability Assessment (WCA) only took place after an assessment phase lasting at least 13 weeks (during which, the claimant is nominally paid ESA but receives the same amount of money as they would if they were on Jobseekers Allowance). She was concerned that this phase might wrongly lead some patients to believe that they were too ill to work – because they were receiving assessment rate ESA and because their GP had indicated that they were not fit for work on the medical certificate needed to initiate a claim – and that it represented a substantial delay in returning to work for those claimants who would later be judged able to work despite their chronic illness or disability; she therefore recommended that the assessment phase be abolished and that ESA only be considered after a WCA has taken place and the claimant has been found unfit for work. The DWP did not take up her recommendation.

In 2014, the number of jobless claimants on the WCA waiting-list ballooned to more than half a million because of problems with the delivery of the WCA itself. This exacerbated the situation that Black had identified in 2011: the waiting time for a WCA now stretched well beyond 13 weeks but these claimants were not included in the official 'claimant count' – a key indicator of the level of unemployment nationally – nor available to Jobcentre Plus staff for help in finding work. By then however, once they had eventually undergone their WCA, the proportion of new claimants being declared unfit for work had risen to 75%.

=== Obesity, drug dependency and ESA ===
In February 2015, the Prime Minister asked Black to advise him urgently on whether withdrawing out-of-work sickness benefits from obese people and those struggling with drug or alcohol addiction would encourage them to seek further medical help for their problems. Mark Harper, who was then a minister of state at the Department for Work and Pensions, told BBC News on 14 February that David Cameron had asked Black to "report back to him in July". The scheme was then incorporated into the Conservative Party's manifesto published before the general election in May. In July, the new government formally re-announced the study, with Black expected to produce her report by the end of 2015.

When quizzed by BBC Radio 4 in October about David Cameron's request, Black said that she had asked for "some time to think about it" but had then been told that the announcement had already been scheduled for the following morning; in the circumstances, she thought: "I might as well just say yes". She acknowledged that substance misuse has little in common with rheumatology, saying that it could be argued that "perhaps it didn't follow on from my other work" but pointed to her reports since 2008 on sickness absence and the assessment phase of the WCA as evidence of her relevant expertise.

The review encountered early criticism from other experts. As Black herself said in the executive summary of her 2008 report: "Many common diseases are directly linked to lifestyle factors, but these are generally not the conditions that keep people out of work. Instead, common mental health problems and musculoskeletal disorders are the major causes of sickness absence and worklessness through ill-health".

When asked by the BBC whether she was concerned that her work might be manipulated for political gain, she replied: "Of course I worry, but all the work I've ever done, both medically and in the reviews I've done for government – and I think they know this – have [sic] been as evidence-based as I could possibly make them". In February 2016, Black was the 'castaway' on Desert Island Discs. When asked about the Prime Minister's idea she said the real question was: "How do you trigger the right response in people? Because lecturing people, bashing them on the head – on the whole, we know – doesn't get us there". Kirsty Young, the presenter, suggested that Black was "somebody who might think that a simplistic political soundbite isn't even beginning to address the underlying issues of, culturally, what we're finding such a problem right now". Black replied: "What I would say is that this is a hugely complex problem and not one thing alone will ever solve it".

== Other appointments ==
In June 2012, Black was announced as the next Principal of Newnham College, Cambridge. She took up the post on 17 September 2012. After seven years, she stepped down from the role in July 2019.

She was a trustee of the National Portrait Gallery and a member of the governing body of Uppingham School. In 2018, Black was appointed Chair of the British Library. In April, she was reappointed as chair for a second four-year term, beginning in September 2022, and will be paid £35,180 per annum.

Black has been Chair of the Centre for Ageing Better since 2019. In July 2025, she was appointed Chair of the Centre for Homelessness Impact, the UK's 'What Works Centre' for homelessness. She took up the role in September 2025.

== Honours and awards ==
She was appointed Commander of the Order of the British Empire (CBE) in 2002 in recognition of her research work on scleroderma, Dame Commander of the Order of the British Empire (DBE) in 2005 while President of the Royal College of Physicians, and Dame Grand Cross of the Order of the British Empire (GBE) in the 2024 New Year Honours for services to combatting drugs.

She was awarded an honorary doctorate of science by the University of Bristol in 2003. She was conferred with an honorary Fellow of the Academy of Medical Educators in 2010. In 2023, she was awarded an honorary doctorate of social sciences by the University of Hong Kong.

In 2024, she became an honorary fellow of both Newnham and Lucy Cavendish Colleges at the University of Cambridge.

Academic offices
Preceded by Sir Kurt George Alberti	President of the Royal College of Physicians; 2002–2006	Succeeded by Ian Gilmore
Preceded by Dame Patricia Hodgson	Principal of Newnham College Cambridge; 2012–2019	Succeeded by Alison Rose
