= Employment and Support Allowance =

Welfare benefit in the United Kingdom

Employment and Support Allowance (ESA) is a United Kingdom welfare payment for adults younger than the State Pension age who are having difficulty finding work because of their long-term medical condition or a disability. It is a basic income-replacement benefit paid in lieu of wages. It is currently being phased out and replaced with Universal Credit for claimants on low incomes, although the contribution-based element remains available.

== Eligibility for ESA ==
An individual can put in a claim for ESA if they satisfy all of these conditions:

- They live in the United Kingdom
- They are over the age of sixteen
- They have not reached their State Pension age
- They have a sick-note from their doctor

They will not be paid ESA if they are entitled to Statutory Sick Pay (which is paid out by a current employer) and it is not possible to receive ESA at the same time as the other main out-of-work benefits, i.e. Jobseekers Allowance or Income Support.

Universal Credit, which is received by one million people nationally, can contain a component analogous to ESA.

== The scale of the allowance ==
No money is paid for the first week. After that, the basic allowance is paid to the claimant until their Work Capability Assessment (WCA) at - in theory - week 13, after which a successful claimant might receive an enhanced level of payment (depending on the level of disability and whether they enter the work-related activity group or the support group after their assessment).

ESA Rates for 2019/2020		
	paid in weeks 2–13	paid from week 14
Basic allowance (for those aged under 25)	£57.90 Per week	£57.90 Per week
Basic allowance (for those aged 25 and over)	£73.10 Per week	£73.10 Per week
Work-related activity component (no longer paid to new claimants)*	———	£29.05 Per week
Support component*	———	£38.55 Per week

* Only one of these components is payable per claim

In April 2017, the work-related activity component was abolished for new claimants. The same applies to successful reclaims, if more than a certain time has elapsed since the last period of receipt of ESA (long-term successful claimants who had a WCA before April 2017 continue to receive it). People receiving the support component are unaffected.

An enhanced disability premium of £16.80 a week may be paid to single people receiving the support component of income-related ESA; for a couple, the rate is £24.10 where one or both partners qualify.

In some circumstances, an additional severe disability premium of £65.85 a week may be paid.

== Types of ESA ==
ESA can be either contributory or income-related.

=== Contributory and Income-Related ESA ===
If claimants have paid enough National Insurance they can claim contributory ESA. Income-related ESA is for people who have not paid enough National Insurance contributions and is subject to a means test and certain other conditions (although the amount paid as contributions-based ESA can also be affected by financial circumstances). A person must have capital of less than £16,000 to be eligible for income-based ESA. This includes any savings that the claimant or their spouse or partner may own. Income-related ESA is not time-limited and is not usually subject to Income Tax, but contribution-based ESA is.

Universal Credit is incorporating income-related ESA in stages. In the parts of the UK where it already has, contribution-based ESA has been rebadged as "new-style ESA".

=== Work-Related Activity Group and Support Group ===
After the Work Capability Assessment, claimants are split into two groups: the Work-Related Activity Group (WRAG) and the Support Group. In February 2017, 66% of claimants were in the Support Group, 17% were in the WRAG, 13% were in the assessment phase and the phase for 3% of claimants were unknown. The WRAG is for claimants who are currently unfit for work but expected to find work in the future. Claimants in the WRAG are required to participate in work-related activity or else they will be sanctioned; where their benefit payments are temporarily stopped. People who are claiming contribution-based ESA and placed in the WRAG are only allowed to claim for one year. WRAG claimants must attend a work-focused interview with a personal advisor, where they discuss how the claimant could find suitable work, and take part in activities to improve their chances of finding work. Some types of activity claimants may participate in include:

- Numeracy or literacy courses
- Learning how to write or improve their CV
- Learning how to manage their disability more effectively.

The support group is for claimants who are not considered fit for work and are unlikely to become fit for work in the near-future. Claimants in this group are paid the support component and are not required to participate in any work-related activity.

== The claim process ==
Someone wanting to claim ESA will need a medical certificate, i.e. a sick-note, signed by their GP to say that they are not fully fit for work. The new claimant must then contact the Department for Work and Pensions (DWP), usually by phone, who will log their claim and usually post them a questionnaire called an ESA50, where the claimant explains how their disability affects them. In rare circumstances, a full assessment is not required, such as when a doctor has officially certified the claimant as being likely to die within six months. The completed form must then be sent in the envelope provided to the Health Assessment Advisory Service - the trading name of the assessment provider, Maximus.

Once a person has submitted a claim for ESA, they will normally be paid assessment rate for 13 weeks. The ESA50 form, together with any other information sent with it by the claimant, will be read by a qualified healthcare professional, who will then decide on whether a face-to-face medical assessment is actually necessary: some people with severe disabilities can be granted ESA based solely on the documents supplied, if that is clear from the paperwork. For this reason, Maximus encourages new claimants to send as much relevant information as possible and give a detailed description of their disability when filling in the claim form. The Claimant is then asked to attend a Work Capability Assessment.

=== Assessing capability for work ===
The assessment is often described as consisting of two separate assessments. In practice, if they have a face-to-face assessment, an individual claimant will experience only one assessment on the day (the decision-making is done afterwards). The two stages are:

- The "limited capability for work" assessment, which determines whether the claimant is entitled to ESA at all.
- The "limited capability for work-related activity" assessment, which tells the DWP whether somebody who has passed the first stage of the test is able to take part in "work-related activity". It also influences the rate of ESA paid to the claimant.

A DWP official makes the final decision on entitlement, based on all the available evidence.

==== Limited capability for work ====
At their WCA, an ESA claimant must be found to have limited capability for work in order to qualify at all. The testing process gauges the claimant's ability to perform up to 17 activities; these activities are set out on the ESA claim form. For each activity, a claimant can score 15, 9, 6 or 0 points: the more severe their disability, the more points they will score. Points are scored by having physical impairments, mental ones or a mixture of the two (if they are likely to significantly affect the claimant's ability to work). In order to be entitled to ESA, a person will need to score at least 15 points in total. Other factors, such as some aspects of pregnancy, are also considered by the assessor, who will be a nurse, doctor, occupational therapist or physiotherapist; these factors do not operate on a points system but might nevertheless qualify the claimant for ESA.

==== Limited capability for work-related activity ====
This is about whether a successful claimant of ESA is capable of taking part in interviews and pre-employment training, or whether their ability to do so is limited to a significant degree. As far as the way the WCA actually operates is concerned, this is about whether the claimant has one or more severe disabilities, affecting the 17 areas which the ESA descriptors focus on. If a person is found to have a severe disability, they will be placed in the Support Group.

== Development of ESA ==
ESA superseded three older benefits: Incapacity Benefit; Income Support paid because of an illness or disability; and Severe Disablement Allowance.

=== Early developments: 1998-2007 ===
A Green Paper published in 1998 proposed partially means-testing Incapacity Benefit and making deductions from the benefit payments for people receiving an occupational pension.

In February 2005, the Welfare Secretary Alan Johnson announced plans to replace Incapacity Benefit with two new benefits: "Disability and Sickness Allowance", for people deemed too ill to work; and "Rehabilitation Support Allowance", paid at the same rate as Jobseekers Allowance to less disabled people, who would be supported by the DWP back into work. No benefits with these names ever materialised.

In March 2005, Atos was awarded the contract to work with the DWP to build the software programme that would be used in the assessment of claims for the allowance that would take the place of Incapacity Benefit. The firm, which was already carrying out the DWP's existing disability assessments, would employ hundreds more healthcare professionals to carry out the new test once it went live - in late 2008.

In January 2006, John Hutton published a White Paper outlining the government's latest plans for welfare reform: the benefit that would replace Incapacity Benefit would be called Employment and Support Allowance and its gateway assessment would be transformed. Over 10 years, Hutton expected the number of people on Incapacity Benefit to fall by one million, thereby saving £7 billion a year. The resulting Welfare Reform Bill was introduced to Parliament for consideration in July 2006. On 3 May 2007, the bill received royal assent.

Blair appointed David Freud as an advisor on out-of-work benefit reform in December 2006. Freud wrote the report: Reducing dependency, increasing opportunity: options for the future of welfare to work in 2007. It called for the greater use of private sector companies who would be paid by results, for substantial resources to be made available to help people on Incapacity Benefit back into work, and for a single working age benefit payment to replace Housing Benefit, Jobseekers Allowance and all other working-age benefits.

In July 2008 a Green Paper was published. It declared that "between 2009 and 2013, all Incapacity Benefit claimants will be reassessed using a medical assessment called the Work Capability Assessment" that would divide them into three groups: fit for work; unfit for work but fit for "work-related activity"; or fit for neither.

==== ESA introduced ====
In October 2008, ESA and its eligibility test, the Work Capability Assessment, were introduced for new claims. The Welfare Secretary wrote that these and other planned changes would ensure that "only those who are genuinely incapable of work" would get full ESA - other sickness benefit recipients would have to comply with plans drawn up with the DWP's private partners to get them back to work. The Department for Work and Pensions (DWP) contracted Atos to perform the WCA when it introduced ESA. In December 2008, Paul Gregg published a report that recommended that most people on ESA should have to undertake work-related activity.

=== Coalition 2010–2015 ===
In early 2011, the Incapacity Benefit reassessment programme got underway using a more stringent version of the WCA and the caseload's falling trend resumed - until the middle of 2013, when the caseload began to grow again after fresh guidance had to be issued on how to judge fitness for work. By 2015, in the absence of the huge fall in recipients prophesied by the architects of ESA, and in spite of the broadly downward natural long-term trend, the total caseload was little different from when ESA was introduced.

Maximus took over the contract – worth £170million a year to the US firm – from Atos in March 2015.

=== 2016–present ===
In 2016, Stephen Crabb, who was the secretary of state for the DWP, declared that there would be no new welfare policies, other than those set out in the Conservative Party manifesto of 2015, in that parliamentary term. In October 2016, Damian Green announced a consultation exercise on reforming the WCA.

==== Underpayments ====
Roughly 70,000 claimants were paid between £5,000 and £20,000 too little from 2011 to 2016 because the DWP miscalculated their entitlement when they were moved from incapacity benefit on to employment and support allowance. A Public Accounts Committee report accused the DWP of haste over the transfer while failing to take legal advice or make basic checks. Evidence that people were underpaid was disregarded and warnings from its own policy advisors that it should delay and sort out the issues before proceeding were ignored. The report said the DWP's lack of urgency – it took six years to start to deal with the error – showed "a culture of indifference" to people being paid too little. Meg Hillier said the affair demonstrated "weakness at the highest levels" of the DWP. "Thousands of people have not received money essential for living costs because of government's blinkered and wholly inept handling of ESA" she said.

== Criticism ==
ESA has been criticised for numerous reasons, including claims that the WCA was poorly designed, that WCA and the criteria used to determine fitness for work did not offer a realistic perspective on a claimant's ability to work, that eligibility did not consider a claimant's personal circumstances when deciding if a claimant is fit for work, the number of decisions that were being overturned on appeal, that assessors were pressured to find claimants fit for work when they did not feel they were, that ESA is being used to conceal unemployment levels, that some people were too sick or disabled to work but could not claim because they had not paid enough National Insurance contributions but their household income was too high, the decision to limit contribution-based ESA claimants who were placed in the WRAG to claiming for one year, that ESA failed to make predicted savings, the cost of outsourcing the contract for conducting the WCA, the cuts made to the amount people on ESA received, difficulties with appealing a decision on eligibility, that claimants were not incentivised to work, that claimants struggled with the application process, the use of sanctions for people in the WRAG who may be too unwell to participate in their work-related activities, that the government had unrealistic expectations for disabled people to find work, that some claimants did not receive enough money to cover their living costs, and that ESA WCAs and claims ending were associated with claimant deaths. A United Nations report has been written, which is highly critical of Employment Support Allowance.

== See also ==
- Work Capability Assessment
- Criticism of the Work Capability Assessment
- Disability pension
- Social Security Disability Insurance
