= Severe Disablement Allowance =

Welfare benefit in the United Kingdom

Severe Disablement Allowance (SDA) was a United Kingdom state benefit intended for those below the state pension age who cannot work because of illness or disability. It was replaced by Incapacity Benefit in April 2001, which itself was replaced by Employment and Support Allowance. However, although it is no longer possible to make a claim for SDA, individuals who are already receiving the benefit have continued to do so. The benefit is administered by Jobcentre Plus (an executive agency of the Department for Work and Pensions).

== Eligibility ==
An individual could have been eligible for Severe Disablement Allowance if:

- they were assessed as being at least 80 per cent disabled and:
  - they were incapable of work because of illness or disability for at least 28 weeks in a row
  - they were between 16 and 64 years old

It was also possible for claimants of Severe Disablement Allowance to receive a 'top-up' of Income Support payments before that benefit was discontinued. For customers under State Pension age, SDA is now being withdrawn and those claimants are being asked to claim ESA instead which requires a fresh application for benefit. Customers over State Pension age are allowed to continue claiming SDA, as long as their circumstances have not changed.
