= Supplementary Benefit =

Welfare benefit in the United Kingdom

Supplementary Benefit was a means-tested benefit in the United Kingdom, paid to people on low incomes, whether or not they were classed as unemployed, such as pensioners, the sick and single parents. Introduced in November 1966, it replaced the earlier system of discretionary National Assistance payments and was intended to 'top up' other benefits, hence its name.

To qualify a claimant had to demonstrate that their capital was below the limit, £6,000, and that their weekly income was less than their requirements, as calculated in accordance with the benefits regulations.

The Supplementary Benefits Commission was established alongside the Ministry of Social Security by the Ministry of Social Security Act 1966 to work to administer the new benefits. Richard Titmuss was appointed vice-chair of the commission.

In 1968 the Ministry of Social Security was incorporated into the new Department of Health and Social Security (DHSS).

The benefit was paid weekly, through giro cheques and order payment books, or fortnightly by the Unemployment Benefit Office by giro and cashed at local post offices.

== Supplementary benefit appeal tribunals ==
Appeals went to supplementary benefit appeal tribunals. In 1984, supplementary benefit appeal tribunals and National Insurance local tribunals were merged into the Social Security Appeal Tribunal.

== Abolition ==
The benefit was abolished and replaced by Income Support on 11 April 1988, as part of a wider overhaul of the benefits system.
