= Fuel Direct =

Fuel Direct is a United Kingdom government policy whereby an individual on certain income related benefits can have a certain amount of their benefit money deducted in order to pay off fuel debts.

== See also ==
- Welfare state in the United Kingdom
