= Paul Gregg (economist) =

Paul Gregg CBE is a British academic, and expert on labour markets and welfare reform. He is currently chair of the Labour Market Advisory Board (a group of experts that advises the Secretary of State for Work and Pensions) and a Commissioner on the Social Mobility and Child Poverty Commission.

== Academic career ==
Paul Gregg is Professor of Economic and Social Policy at the University of Bath and Senior Research Fellow in Labour Markets at the Centre for Economic Performance at the London School of Economics.

He is a programme director at the Centre for Market and Public Organisation at the University of Bristol covering Families, Children and Welfare, and former Professor of Economics at the University of Bristol, and Director of the Centre for the Analysis of Social Policy at the University of Bath.

He is a member of the Governing Board of the New UK Birth Cohort Study, and is affiliated to the Centre for Economic Performance at HM Treasury.

He has published widely on employment and household issues, and is joint editor of “The labour market in winter: the state of working Britain 2010” (Oxford: Oxford University Press, 2011).

He was appointed CBE in the 2018 New Year Honours for services to children and social mobility.

== Welfare reform ==
From 1997-2006, he was a member of the Council of Economic Advisors at HM Treasury, where he worked on unemployment, welfare reform and child poverty.

He was appointed to a CBI steering group on Getting the UK Working, and a commission on youth unemployment run by AVECO and headed by David Miliband. He was a member of the London Child Poverty Commission 2006-2010.

In 2009, Professor Gregg completed a review of 'Personalised Support and Conditionality in the Welfare System' for the Department for Work and Pensions. This helped the government to draw up plans to require many Incapacity Benefit recipients to participate in work-related activity - but not work itself - as a condition of receiving their benefit.

Having helped in the design of Employment Support Allowance (ESA), Professor Gregg has since criticised the tests for fitness for work - the Work Capability Assessment - that is a key part of its implementation.

In July 2012, Professor Gregg featured on the BBC Panorama programme titled 'Disabled or Faking It?'
