= Capital rule =

British rule for determining eligibility for aid

The capital rule is a British rule for determining eligibility for social security benefits. The means tested social security system in the United Kingdom has always operated an eligibility test for savings. The Poor law required claimants to be destitute but there does not appear to be any documentation about how the test of destitution was applied. The great increase in home-ownership during the twentieth century in the UK necessitated detailed rules about how a claimant's capital should be treated. Since at least 1948 the value of a claimant's home has been disregarded in assessing their resources.

Capital has always been assessed on a household basis, that is jointly for a couple, whether or not married. The capital of any dependent children is normally disregarded.

The National Assistance Act 1948 (11 & 12 Geo. 6. c. 29) established that the value of the claimant's home should be disregarded, as were war savings and up to £375 in savings. Capital in excess of £50 but below £375 was treated as generating an income of six pence per week for each £25.

Under the Supplementary Benefit scheme, introduced in 1966, the detailed rules were not published, but in 1980 it was put on a statutory footing with the publishing of detailed regulations. The capital cut off was originally established as £2000.

== Income Support ==
With the change to Income Support in 1988 the capital rules were largely the same as those for Supplementary Benefit. The capital cut off was set at £6000, and capital between £3000 and £6000 was treated as generating income of £1 per week for each £250.

The rules about capital generally apply to Housing Benefit and other means tested benefits but there are some differences between the rules for different benefits.

The value of the home was completely ignored if the claimant normally lived in it as was money deposited with a Housing Association. The value of any other property in which the claimant did not live was ignored for six months or longer if it was reasonable and the claimant had:

- bought a home and not yet moved in particularly if they were doing repairs or alterations so they can live in it,
- separated from a former partner,
- moved into residential care,
- started legal proceedings to regain possession, or
- taken steps to sell it.

Money from the sale of a home, money given or borrowed for repairs, replacements or improvements, property for sale which they are taking reasonable steps to sell, were all ignored for six months and sometimes longer. If they started legal action to enable them to live in a property the value of the property might be disregarded while the legal action goes on if they cannot live in it.

Any premises occupied by an elderly or incapacitated relative or by a former partner are disregarded. Money held in trust which the claimant is entitled to is counted, unless it is money for a personal injury or a discretionary trust in which case it is ignored.

Other personal possessions are normally ignored unless they had been acquired in order to avoid the capital rules. The assets of a business are ignored so long as the claimant continues to work in that business, or intends to return to the business when their health permits. There are special rules if a claimant's business is registered as a limited company.

Any payment of arrears of benefit are generally ignored for 12 months, and if more than £5000, paid to rectify or compensate for an official error, indefinitely.

The value of a personal pension scheme, life insurance or annuity is ignored, together with a long list of compensation and charitable payments.

== Universal Credit ==
Under Universal Credit the first £6000 is ignored. Capital over £16000 disqualifies the claimant. Capital between those limits if treated as giving tariff income of £4.35 per month for each £250, or part of £250.

== Notional capital ==
A person may be treated as having capital which they do not actually possess. This most commonly happens if they are considered to have deprived themselves of capital in order to evade the capital rules. It can also happen if they do not apply for money which is theirs, or if someone makes a payment on their behalf to a third person, or if they get a payment on behalf of another person but fail to pass it on.

== Valuation of capital ==
10% is allowed against the valuation of capital if there are expenses involved in realising it. Otherwise capital is valued at current market value. The value of any debt or mortgage secured on a property is deducted. Apart from that there is no provision for counting debts against assets. Jointly owned property is normally divided by the number of joint owners.
