= Welfare state in the United Kingdom =

A pie chart of UK central government expenditure, 2009–10. Social protection is shown in orange, health in red, education in grey, and personal services in light blue. The welfare state represents around two-thirds of total government spending.

The welfare state of the United Kingdom began to evolve in the 1900s and early 1910s, and comprises expenditures by the government of the United Kingdom of Great Britain and Northern Ireland intended to improve health, education, employment and social security. The British system has been classified as a liberal welfare state system.

== History ==
Before the official establishment of the modern welfare state, clear examples of social welfare existed to help the poor and vulnerable within British society. A key date in the welfare state's history is 1563; when Queen Elizabeth I's government encouraged the wealthier members of society to give to the poor, by passing the Poor Act 1562.

The welfare state in the modern sense was anticipated by the Royal Commission into the Operation of the Poor Laws 1832 which found that the Poor Relief Act 1601 (a part of the English Poor laws) was subject to widespread abuse and promoted squalor, idleness and criminality in its recipients, compared to those who received private charity. Accordingly, the qualifications for receiving aid were tightened up, forcing many recipients to either turn to private charity or accept employment.

Opinions began to be changed late in the century by reports drawn up by men such as Seebohm Rowntree and Charles Booth into the levels of poverty in Britain. These reports indicated that in the massive industrial cities, between one-quarter and one-third of the population were living below the poverty line.

A 2022 study linked trade shocks during the first globalization (1870–1914) with increased support for a welfare state and reduced support for the Conservative Party.

=== Liberal reforms ===
The late nineteenth century saw the emergence of New Liberalism within the Liberal Party, which advocated state intervention as a means of guaranteeing freedom and removing obstacles to it such as poverty and unemployment. The policies of the New Liberalism are now known as social liberalism.

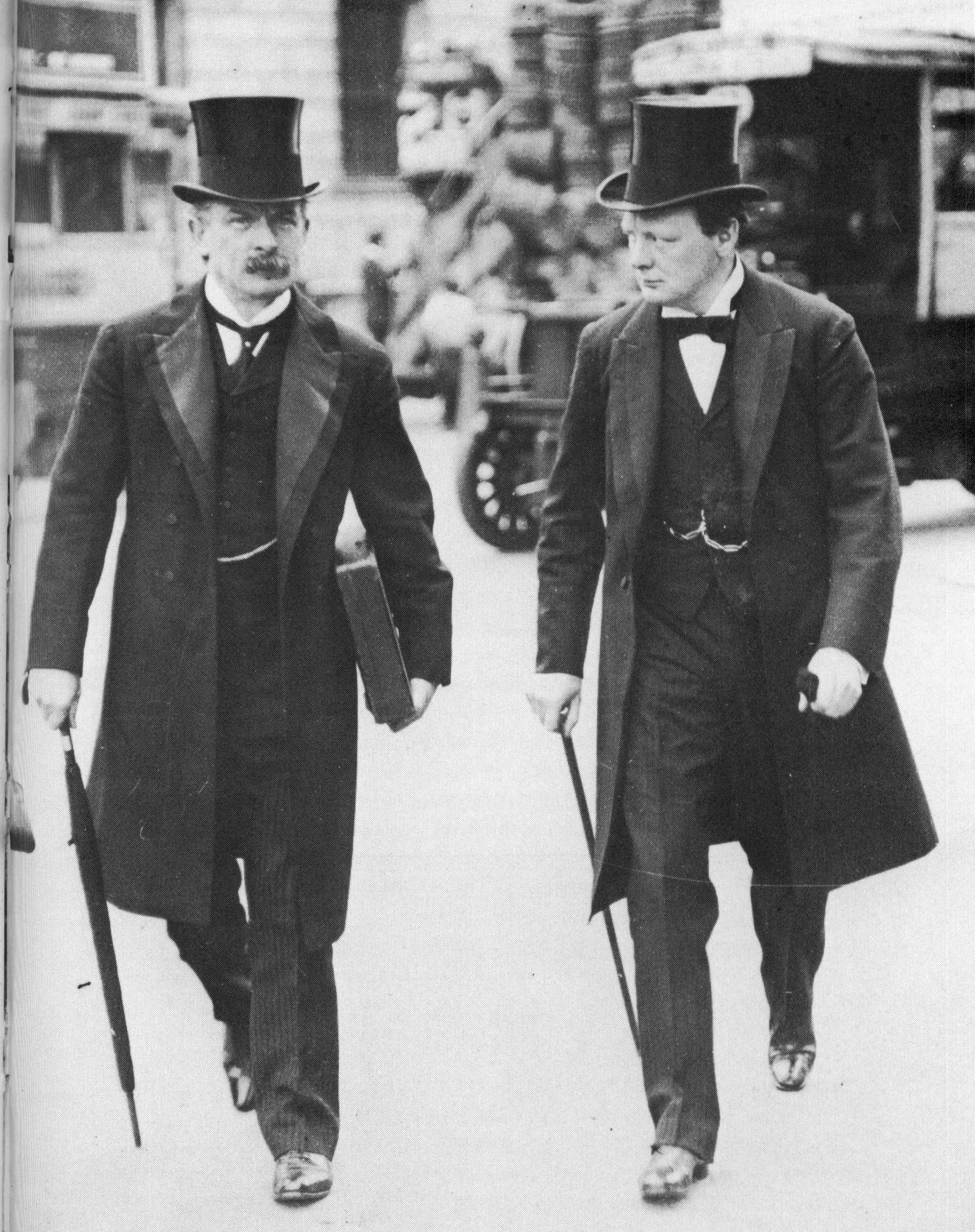
Liberal politicians David Lloyd George and Winston Churchill enacted the 1909 People's Budget which specifically aimed at the redistribution of wealth.

The New Liberals included intellectuals like L. T. Hobhouse, and John A. Hobson. They saw individual liberty as something achievable only under favourable social and economic circumstances. In their view, the poverty, squalor, and ignorance in which many people lived made it impossible for freedom and individuality to flourish. New Liberals believed that these conditions could be ameliorated only through collective action coordinated by a strong, welfare-oriented, and interventionist state.

After the historic 1906 victory, the Liberal Party launched the welfare state with a series of major reforms in 1906–1914. The reforms were greatly extended over the next forty years. The Liberal Party introduced multiple reforms on a range of issues, including health insurance, unemployment insurance, and pensions for elderly workers, thereby laying the groundwork for the future British welfare state. Some proposals failed, such as licensing fewer pubs, or rolling back Conservative educational policies. The People's Budget of 1909, championed by David Lloyd George and fellow Liberal Winston Churchill, introduced unprecedented taxes on the wealthy in Britain and radical social programmes to the country's policies. In the Liberal camp, as noted by one study, "the Budget was on the whole enthusiastically received." It was the first budget with the expressed intent of redistributing wealth among the public. It imposed increased taxes on luxuries, liquor, tobacco, high incomes, and land – taxation that fell heavily on the rich. The new money was to be made available for new welfare programmes as well as new battleships. In 1911 Lloyd George succeeded in putting through Parliament his National Insurance Act, making provision for sickness and invalidism, and this was followed by his Unemployment Insurance Act.

The minimum wage was introduced in Great Britain in 1909 for certain low-wage industries and expanded to numerous industries, including farm labour, by 1920. However, by the 1920s, a new perspective was offered by reformers to emphasise the usefulness of family allowance targeted at low-income families was the alternative to relieving poverty without distorting the labour market. The trade unions and the Labour Party adopted this view. In 1945, family allowances were introduced; minimum wages faded from view.

The experience of almost total state control during the Second World War had encouraged the belief that the state might be able to solve problems in wide areas of national life.

The Liberal government of 1906–1914 implemented welfare policies concerning three main groups in society: the old, the young and working people.

Young	Old	Working
In 1906 local authorities were allowed to provide free school meals.; The Children and Young Persons Act 1908 introduced a set of regulations that became known as the Children's Charter. This imposed severe punishments for neglecting or treating children cruelly. It was made illegal to sell cigarettes to children or send them out begging. Separate juvenile courts were set up, which sent children convicted of a crime to borstals (a forerunner to modern youth detention centres), instead of prison.	In 1908 pensions were introduced for the over 70s.	In 1909 Labour Exchanges were set up to help unemployed people find work.; The National Insurance Act 1911 was passed, ensuring free medical treatment, and sick pay of 10 shillings a week for 26 weeks. An estimated 13 million workers came to be compulsorily covered under this scheme.

=== Beveridge Report and Labour ===
The aftermath of the First World War boosted demands for social reform, and led to a permanent increase in the role of the state in British society. The end of the war also brought a period of unemployment and poverty, particularly in northern industrial towns, that deepened into the Great Depression by the 1930s.

During the war, the government became much more involved in people's lives via governmental organisation of the rationing of foodstuffs, clothing and fuel and extra milk and meals being given to expectant mothers and children. The wartime coalition, and the introduction of family allowances. Many people welcomed this government intervention and wanted it to go further.

The Beveridge Report of 1942, (which identified five "Giant Evils" in society: squalor, ignorance, want, idleness and disease) essentially recommended a national, compulsory, flat rate insurance scheme which would combine unemployment, widows benefit, child benefit and retirement benefits into one central government support scheme. In regards to healthcare Beveridge preferred the contemporary healthcare system of voluntary and private hospitals "more than that of a taxpayer funded healthcare" believing more people would access healthcare when they need it if they were voluntarily involved in their own healthcare. But it is key to note Beveridge still emphasised that healthcare should be accessible for everyone in the United Kingdom and that people should give what they can according to their means when receiving healthcare in voluntary hospitals. Beveridge himself was careful to emphasise that unemployment benefits should be held to a subsistence level, and after six months would be conditional on work or training, so as not to encourage abuse of the system. That was however predicated on the concept of the "maintenance of employment" which meant 'it should be possible to make unemployment of any individual for more than 26 weeks continuously a rare thing in normal times' and recognised that the imposition of a training condition would be impractical if the unemployed were numbered by the million. After its victory in the 1945 general election, the Labour Party pledged to eradicate the Giant Evils, and undertook policy measures to provide for the people of the United Kingdom "from the cradle to the grave." While the original intention of the report was to abolish these Giant Evils, the implementation of these suggested policies aimed to reduce income, health, and educational inequalities. However, the lack of real follow-through on Beveridge's recommended strategies meant that the Labour government ultimately failed to abolish poverty with their reforms.

Included among the laws passed were the National Assistance Act 1948 (11 & 12 Geo. 6. c. 29), National Insurance Act 1946, and National Insurance (Industrial Injuries) Act 1946.

== Impact ==
This policy resulted in increased expenditure and a widening of what was considered to be the state's responsibility. In addition to the central services of education, health, unemployment and sickness allowances, the welfare state also included the idea of increasing redistributive taxation, and increasing regulation of industry, food, and housing (better safety regulations, weights and measures controls, etc.)

The foundation of the National Health Service (NHS) did not involve building new hospitals, but nationalisation of existing municipal provision and charitable foundations. The aim was not to substantially increase provision but to standardise care across the country; indeed William Beveridge believed that the overall cost of medical care would decrease, as people became healthier and so needed less treatment.

However, instead of falling, the cost of the NHS has risen by 4% annually on average due to an ageing population, leading to a reduction in provision. Charges for dentures, and spectacles were introduced in 1951 by the same Labour government that had founded the NHS three years earlier, and prescription charges by the successive Conservative Government were introduced in 1952. In 1988, free eye tests for all were abolished, although they are now free for the over-60s.

After 1979, Margaret Thatcher had laid the post-war Keynesian consensus to rest, in favour of an individualist and Monetarist welfare policy, guided by the economy. This Thatcherite consensus was characterised by policies such as privatisation, driven by her belief in individualism and competition. Therefore, her main focus was to attempt to control public spending, privatisation, targeting and rising inequality, so much of the 1980s was focused on cutting public spending in the UK.

Policies differ in different regions of the United Kingdom, but the provision of a welfare state is still a basic principle of government policy in the United Kingdom today. The principle of health care "free at the point of use" became a central idea of the welfare state, which later Conservative governments, although critical of some aspects of the welfare state, did not reverse.

Working-age social security funding dropped by £37 bn under the United Kingdom government austerity programme of 2010 - 2019, cuts to benefits that disabled people receive were significant: Personal Independence Payments and Employment and Support Allowance dropped by 10%. Over half of families living below the breadline have at least one relative with a disability. Cuts included tax credits (£4.6bn), Universal Credit (£3.6bn), Child Benefit (£3.4bn), disability benefits (£2.8bn), Employment and Support Allowance and Incapacity Benefit (£2bn) and Housing Benefit (£2.3bn). Frank Field said, "A £37bn attack has been mounted on the living standards of many of our fellow citizens to such an extent that possibly millions struggle to keep on top of their rent, pay the bills and buy adequate food. Likewise, an unknown number are unable to clothe their children properly before sending them to school where all too many of these children not only rely on free school dinners as a cornerstone of their diet, but on breakfast and supper clubs as well."

== Expenditure ==
In the financial year 2014/15, state pensions were overwhelmingly the largest governmental social protection expense, costing £86.5bn, followed by housing benefit, which accounted for over £20bn. Expenditure in 2015–16 on benefits included: £2.3bn paid to unemployed people and £27.1bn to people on low incomes, and £27.6bn for personal tax credits.

UK Government welfare expenditure 2011–12 (percent)
1. State pension (46.0%)
2. Housing Benefit (11.0%)
3. Disability Living Allowance (8.00%)
4. Pension Credit (5.00%)
5. Income Support (4.00%)
6. Rent rebates (3.00%)
7. Attendance Allowance (3.00%)
8. Jobseeker's Allowance (3.00%)
9. Incapacity Benefit (3.00%)
10. Council Tax Benefit (3.00%)
11. Other (11.0%)

In 2023/24, it is expected that government health spending, which is the biggest element of public spending, will reach £176.2bn. Other welfare expenses include education, which is predicted to reached £81.4bn, and state pensions, for which expenditure will be £124.3bn.

UK Government welfare expenditure 2014–15
Benefit	Expenditure (£bn)
State pension	86.5
Tax credits (Working tax credits and Child tax credits)	29.7
Housing Benefit	23.5
Disability Living Allowance	15.4
Incapacity benefits	14.1
Child benefit	11.6
Pension Credit	6.6
Attendance Allowance	5.4
Jobseeker's Allowance	3.1
Income Support	2.6
Maternity and paternity pay	2.4
Carer's Allowance	2.3
Winter fuel payments	2.1
War pensions	0.8
Universal Credit	0.1
Other	5.9
Total	213.9

== Criticisms ==
Conservative thinkers have debated the structural incompatibility between liberal principles and welfare state principles. Certain sectors of society have argued that the welfare state creates a disincentive for working and investment. Also suggesting that the welfare state at times does not eliminate the causes of individual contingencies and needs. Economically, the net losers of the welfare state are often more against its values and role within society.

In 2010, the Conservative-Lib Dem coalition government led by David Cameron argued for a reduction of social-security spending in the United Kingdom as part of their programme of austerity. Government ministers have argued that a growing culture of benefits dependency is perpetuating social security spending, and claim that a cultural change is required to reduce the social protection bill. Public opinion in the UK appears to support a reduction in social protection spending, however commentators have suggested that negative public perceptions are founded on exaggerated assumptions about the proportion of spending on unemployment benefit and the level of benefit fraud.

Figures from the Department for Work and Pensions show that benefit fraud is thought to have cost taxpayers £1.2 billion during 2012–13, up 9% on the year before. This was lower than the £1.5 billion of benefit underpayment due to error.

In some cases, relatives who bring up a child when the parents cannot bring up the child face sanctions and financial penalties, they can be left poor and homeless. There are also widespread complaints from church groups and others that the UK welfare state does insufficient work to prevent poverty, deprivation and even hunger. In 2018, food bank usage in the UK reached its highest point on record, with the UK's main food bank provider, The Trussell Trust, stating that social security benefits do not cover basic living costs. The Trussell Trust's figures showed that 1,332,952 three-day emergency food supplies were delivered to people from March 2017 to March 2018. This represented a 13% increase from the previous year.

In 2018 support for raising taxes to finance more provision on health, education and social benefits was the highest it had been since 2002 according to NatCen Social Research. Two-thirds of Labour supporters favoured tax rises and 53% of Conservatives also favoured that.

In 2018 the House of Commons library estimated that by 2021, £37bn less would be spent on working-age social security than in 2010. Cuts to disability benefits, Personal Independence Payments (PIP) and employment and support allowance (ESA) are noteworthy, they will have fallen by 10%, since 2010. Over half of families with income below the breadline include at least one person with a disability. There are also cuts to tax credits Universal Credit child benefit disability benefits ESA and incapacity benefit and housing benefit. Alison Garnham of the Child Poverty Action Group said, "Cuts and freezes have taken family budgets to the bone as costs rise and there is more pain to come as the two-child limit for tax credits and universal credit, the bedroom tax, the benefit cap and the rollout of universal credit push families deeper into poverty."

Social security payments in 2019 were the lowest they had been since the welfare state was started and food bank use had increased. The Institute for Public Policy Research (IPPR) found £73 per week, (which is standard for Universal Credit that 2.3 million people claim) amounted to 12.5% of median earnings. When unemployment benefit was introduced in 1948 it amounted to 20%. Millions of people in 2019 were "excluded from mainstream society, with the basic goods and amenities needed to survive let alone thrive increasingly out of their grip". The IPPR urged all parties to add an emergency £8.4bn into the social security system, which has become harder than previous systems because debt deductions are made from payments, there is increasing underpayment and strict sanctions are applied. One in three universal credit claimants are working.

Numerous negative consequences have been attributed to benefit sanctions imposed by the Department for Work and Pensions (DWP), the UK Government department that oversees the majority of social security provision in the UK. These include "increased debt and rent arrears, food poverty, crime and worsening physical and mental health. Statistics indicate that in the period of 2011 to 2015 benefit sanctions on people with mental health problems increased by 668%. 19,259 people with mental health problems had benefits stopped in the period of 2014 to 2015, compared to 2,507 people in the period of 2011 to 2012. In 2020, the UK Government admitted that it had made no assessment of the impact that benefit sanctions made on mental health. At the same point in time the Government also refused to assess the impact benefit sanctions have on people's mental health, which came after repeated warnings on the long-term damage they can cause to people supported by those payments and to those people's families. Also in 2020, it was reported that at least 69 suicides were linked to the DWP's handling of benefit claims. The National Audit Office (NAO) said the actual number of deaths linked to claims could be much higher than this. It was also reported that the DWP was not looking into information from coroners or families, nor investigating all the reports of suicide of which it had been made aware. In the same year, the DWP was accused of a "cover-up" due to destroying approximately 50 reports connected to benefits being stopped. Officials blamed data protection laws for the actions, though the data watchdog denied there was any requirement to destroy the documents by any date. In March 2022, an academic study into whether benefit sanctions are linked to claimant ill-health, including mental illness and suicide was stopped after the DWP and Government ministers refused to release their recorded data on sanctions.

From a contemporary perspective, in practice, social welfare in the United Kingdom is very different from the ideal version of the welfare state that people may carry. Coverage is extensive, but benefits and services are delivered at a low level. The social protection provided is patchy, and services are tightly rationed." This opinion appears to be growing in popularity amongst the general population of the UK. Evidence adduced to support this criticism is that the UK has tax revenue, as a share of GDP, of 35.3% compared with France's 45.6%, Germany's 40.3%, and Italy's 41.7%. It was also found, in a 2021 study by The Health Foundation, that Britain spends the 6th most money on health care amongst "developed countries". This figure sits below the EU average and explains why some believe the welfare state is not so successful. In 2019, the UK dedicated roughly one-fifth of its GDP to social spending. That placed "[the UK] 17th – roughly in the middle – of OECD countries" (Whiteford, 2022).

Over the course of the COVID-19 pandemic, it became clear that there was a distinct shortage of provisions available to support public health, including a lack of beds in the NHS and a lack of personal protective equipment (PPE). In the closing statement of the British Medical Association (BMA) in July 2023, it was noted that this lack of pandemic preparedness manifested in four key areas; failure to protect healthcare workers, lack of capacity and resources, failings of the test and trace system, and failings in government structures and processes. The statement also claimed that the "UK was bottom of the table on numbers of doctors, nurses, beds, intensive care units, respirators and ventilators", and that funding of healthcare has been inadequate since 2010, suggesting that the state the NHS found itself in at the outbreak of the pandemic had not been an overnight shift, but rather the effect of the past decade's funding issues.

The UK has seen a drastic increase in the usage of foodbanks nationwide: 2.17m food bank users in 2021/22 in comparison to the 41,000 in 2009/10. During the COVID-19 crisis, food insecurity affected 16% of the population, and some critics argue that government food aid was instigated too late for the elderly and vulnerable. There have also been criticisms of the food parcels given, as reports stated that the parcels lacked nutritional food and instead contained an abundance of processed foods.

== Historical statistics on social security trends ==
=== Benefit rates as a percentage of industrial earnings ===
Benefit rates as a per cent of industrial earnings of male manual workers aged 21 and over (1948–1971)
Year (month)	Single pension	Supplementary Benefit for single person	Family Allowance for four children
1948 (October)	18.9	17.5	10.9
1961 (April)	19.1	17.8	9.3
1962 (April)	18.4	17.1	8.9
1963 (May)	20.8	19.5	8.6
1964 (April)	19.2	18.1	8.0
1964 (October)	18.7	17.6	7.7
1965 (April)	21.2	20.1	7.4
1965 (October)	20.4	19.4	7.1
1966 (April)	19.8	18.8	6.9
1966 (October)	19.7	20.0	6.9
1967 (April)	19.4	19.7	6.8
1967 (October)	21.0	20.1	7.7
1968 (April)	20.2	19.3	11.9
1968 (October)	19.6	19.8	12.6
1969 (April)	18.8	19.3	12.1
1969 (November)	20.0	19.2	11.7
1970 (April)	19.0	18.3	11.3
1970 (November)	17.6	18.3	10.2
1971 (March) (est.)	17.3	18.0	10.0

Note on source, as quoted in the text: "based on statistics of weekly earnings, Employment and Productivity Gazette."

=== Changes in National Assistance/Supplementary Benefit ===
Changes in National Assistance/Supplementary Benefit scale (1963–1969) (a)
Date of change	Real value single pensioner	Real value married man with three children (b)	Real take home pay for average worker
May 1963	100	100	100
March 1965	111	112	106
November 1966	117	110	106
October 1967	122	115	108
November 1969	122	115	110

Notes

- (a) As quoted in the text: "the scale is calculated using the average discretionary addition (adjusted to spread winter fuel costs throughout the year) for retirement pensioners. It does not include any allowance for rent. The price index used for the single pensioner is that in the Employment and Productivity Gazette."
- (b) As quoted in the text: "it is assumed that the children are aged four, six, and eleven."

=== Increases in National Insurance benefits ===
Increases in National Insurance benefits (1963–1969):
Date of increase	Real take home pay for average worker (a)	Real value of single pension (b)	Real value of unemployment benefit (man with wife and three children) (c)
March/May 1963	100	100	100
January/March 1965	106	111	110
October 1967	108	114	113
November 1969	110	114	116

Notes

- (a) As quoted by text: "Based on average earnings for adult male manual workers in manufacturing, allowing for income tax and national insurance contributions."
- (b) As quoted by text: "Calculated on the special price index for single pensioner households published by the Employment and Productivity Gazette adjusted for housing expenditure using the housing component of the retail price index. Since a disproportionate number of pensioners have controlled tenancies, this may overstate the increase in prices."
- (c) This column is deflated by use of the Retail Price Index

=== Social security benefits as a percentage of average earnings ===
Social security benefits as a percentage of average earnings for last increases of various governments, 1951–1979
Government	Sickness/unemployment benefit a	a plus earnings related supplement	Retirement pensions c	Supplementary allowance/benefits d	Family allowance/child benefit e
Labour (1951)	25.7	25.7	30.4	30.4	8.0
Conservative (1963)	33.8	33.8	33.0	31.6	5.3
Labour (1969)	32.4	52.3	32.4	31.4	3.8
Conservative (1973)	29.1	46.2	30.5	28.5	3.0
Labour (1978)	30.5	44.4	37.4	30.2	3.7

- a,b Man plus dependent wife.
- c Man plus dependent wife on his insurance.
- d Married couple.
- e For one child.

=== Social policy benefits and earnings under the Labour Government 1964–1969 ===
Social policy benefits and earnings under Labour 1963–1969:
Year	Unemployment, sickness, and retirement benefits (single)	Retirement pension (married)	National assistance/supplementary benefit (married couple)	Adult male manual workers (weekly earnings)	Adult male administrative, technical, and clerical employees (weekly earnings)
1963	100	100	100	100	100
1969	148	149	150	154	148

=== Supplementary benefits rates as a proportion of income ===
Supplementary benefit rates as a proportion of gross and net income at average earnings, married couple:
Year	End of year (a)	
	As % of gross average earnings	
	Ordinary rate	Long term rate
1973	28.5	31.4
1974	28.1	33.6
1975	29.8	36.2
1976	30.8	37.1
1977	32.3	38.9
1978	30.6	37.8
	As % of net income (b) at average earnings	
	Ordinary rate	Long term rate
1973	37.9	41.8
1974	38.8	46.5
1975	42.4	51.5
1976	43.9	52.9
1977	44.1	53.1
1978	41.6	51.4

Supplementary benefit: long term scale rate as proportion of ordinary rate (%)
Date of introduction	Single	Married couple
1973	14.0	10.3
1974	23.8	19.8
1975 (April)	25.0	20.4
1975 (November)	25.7	21.4
1976	23.6	20.3
1977	23.4	20.4
1978	28.0	23.5

=== Households dependent on Supplementary Benefit ===
Numbers in households dependent on supplementary benefit or with estimated incomes below SB level, 1974 and 1976 (thousands)
Year	Pensioners		Under pensionable age family head or single parent			
Year		(as % of total)	Unemployed	Normally in full-time work	Sick or disabled	Others
1974	2,680	(52%)	450	360	480	1,170
1976	2,800	(44%)	1,080	890	280	1,300

=== Changes in real terms in social security benefits ===
Changes in real terms in social security benefits, 1964–1979 (in 1981 prices, 1951= 100):
Year	Supplementary benefits (a)	Sickness/unemployment benefit (b)	Retirement pensions (c)	Family allowance/child benefit (d)
1964	146	176	149	85
1965	166	199	168	85
1966	165	199	168	82
1967	173	318	173	80
1968	173	318	173	77
1969	172	329	172	72
1970	173	329	172	69
1971	178	354	177	80
1972	187	356	183	75
1973	186	342	191	68
1974	191	345	216	78
1975	187	327	215	69
1976	189	323	219	72
1977	190	326	221	69
1978	189	321	228	82
1979	190	308	232	102

Notes

- (a) Refers to married couple.
- (b) Refers to man plus dependent wife.
- (c) Refers to man plus wife on his insurance. After 1971 refers to recipients under 80 years old.
- (d) Includes family allowance and tax allowance combined for second child up to 1977, when these were unified into the child benefit.

=== Percentage change in social security benefits, prices and earnings ===
Percentage change in social security benefits, prices, and earnings since previous updating (1974–1978):
Date	Unemployment and sickness benefit (a)	Retirement pension (b)	Prices (c)	Average earnings (d)
July 1974	17.0	29.0	13.5	12.9
April 1975	14.0	16.0	17.7	17.4
November 1975	13.3	14.7	11.7	10.7
November 1976	16.2	15.0	15.0	12.8
November 1977	14.0	14.4	13.0	9.6
November 1978	7.1	11.4	8.1	14.6
Total increase October 1973 – 1978	114.3	151.6	109.6	107.9

- (a) Single person.
- (b) Single pensioner under age 80.
- (c) General index of retail prices.
- (d) Average gross weekly earnings of full-time adult male manual workers. For November 1978, October 1977 to October 1978 increase used.

=== Unemployment and sickness benefits as a percentage of income ===
Unemployment or sickness benefits as percentage of net income (a) at average earnings (b):
Year	Single person		Married couple		Married couple with two children	
Year	Excl. ERS	Inc. ERS (c)	Excl. ERS	Inc. ERS (c)	Excl. ERS	Inc. ERS (c)
1965	27.0	27.0	41.2	41.2	49.3	49.3
1970	25.0	53.3	38.4	65.2	48.3	72.7
1973	24.8	48.4	38.7	61.5	49.5	70.6
1974	25.6	48.6	39.5	61.6	50.2	70.3
1975	24.5	45.9	38.0	58.4	48.3	67.0
1976	24.9	46.7	38.3	59.1	48.4	67.3
1977	25.8	47.9	39.1	59.9	49.7	68.8
1978	25.4	45.1	38.8	57.4	49.6	66.9

- (a) After allowing for income tax and national insurance contributions.
- (b) Average earnings of adult male manual workers.
- (c) Earnings Related Supplement calculated using average earnings in October of the relevant tax year.

=== The real value of social security benefits, 1948–1975 ===
Value of social security benefits in £1981 s
Date	Unemployment benefit	Retirement pension	Supplementary benefit	Child support: one child	Child support: three children
1948, July	19.64	19.64	17.93	4.87	17.60
1961, April	26.88	26.88	25.31	4.36	16.62
1971, September	34.96	34.96	33.39	4.27	15.36
1975, November	36.47	42.96	35.10	3.67	13.81

== See also ==
- History of poverty in the United Kingdom
- History of the welfare state in the United Kingdom
- Social welfare
- Universal basic income in the United Kingdom
- Welfare reform
- Workfare in the United Kingdom

Housing

- Public housing
- Housing estate
- Council house

== Bibliography ==
- Béland, Daniel, and Alex Waddan. "Conservatives, partisan dynamics and the politics of universality: reforming universal social programmes in the UK and Canada." Journal of Poverty and Social Justice 22#2 (2014): 83–97.
- Bruce, Maurice. The Coming of the Welfare State (1966) online
- Calder, Gideon, and Jeremy Gass. Changing Directions of the British Welfare State (University of Wales Press, 2012).
- Esping-Andersen, Gosta; The Three Worlds of Welfare Capitalism, (Princeton University Press (1990).
- Ferragina, Emanuele and Seeleib-Kaiser, Martin. "Welfare Regime Debate: Past, Present, Futures?" Policy & Politics 39#4 pp. 583–611 (2011). online
- Forder, Anthony, ed. Penelope Hall's Social Services of England and Wales (Routledge, 2013).
- Fraser, Derek. The evolution of the British welfare state: a history of social policy since the Industrial Revolution (2nd ed. 1984).
- Häusermann, Silja, Georg Picot, and Dominik Geering. "Review article: Rethinking party politics and the welfare state–recent advances in the literature." British Journal of Political Science 43.01 (2013): 221–40. online
- Heclo, Hugh. Modern Social Politics in Britain and Sweden. From Relief to Income Maintenance (Yale UP, 1974) online
- Hill, Michael J. The welfare state in Britain : a political history since 1945 (1993) online
- Jones, Margaret, and Rodney Lowe, eds. From Beveridge to Blair: the first fifty years of Britain's welfare state 1948–98 (Manchester UP, 2002). online
- Laybourn Keith. The Evolution of British Social Policy and the Welfare State, c. 1800–1993 (Keele University Press. 1995). online
- Slater, Tom. "The myth of "Broken Britain": welfare reform and the production of ignorance." Antipode 46.4 (2014): 948–69. online
- Sullivan, Michael. The development of the British welfare state (1996)
- Welshman John. Underclass: A History of the Excluded, 1880–2000 (2006) excerpt
