= Invalidity Benefit =

Former UK welfare benefit

Invalidity Benefit was a benefit from the United Kingdom's National Insurance scheme that was introduced in 1971 by Edward Heath's government. It was paid to people who had been invalided out of their trade or occupation after sustaining an injury or developing a long-term illness. Claimants were considered eligible if the average employer would be disinclined to employ them when compared with a fully fit person. The benefit was handled by the Department of Health and Social Security and was replaced by Incapacity Benefit in 1995.

== History ==
In September 1971, Keith Joseph, then Secretary of State at the Department of Health and Social Security, introduced Invalidity Benefit in the National Insurance Act 1971. The founding of the benefit has been praised for "helping establish a civilised welfare state" where the sick citizens can feel secure in times of ill health.

Tania Burchardt from the London School of Economics has described the 1970s and 1980s as decades that were notable for an "improvement of the coverage of earnings-replacement benefits", and produced data showing that a disabled person who was unable to work would be receiving more money in real terms than they would have done in the 1950s and 1960s.

=== Rise in number of claimants ===
The number of claimants of sickness benefits increased rapidly from the 1970s onwards. In the late 1980s, unemployment levels fell without a corresponding rise in the number of jobs created, while Invalidity Benefit claims continued to rise without any indications that the population's health was declining. The National Audit Office published a report in 1990, which found that between 1983–84 there were 760,000 claimants, at a cost of £4 billion. By 1987–88 there were just over 1 million claimants, with costing more than £4 billion.

A number of reasons have been proposed for this rise:

==== Growth in Structural Unemployment ====
A study published in the British Medical Journal suggested that the decline in manual employment was the main reason for rising levels of Invalidity claims, as men who had been in a manual occupation were the most likely to be claiming Invalidity Benefit. The authors of the study also suggested that people who had lost their job found claiming Invalidity Benefit preferable to claiming Unemployment Benefit because it paid more and did not carry the same stigma as being unemployed.

==== Changes to the Benefit System ====
A paper published in the Economic Journal suggested that changes to the benefits system encouraged claimants to go onto Invalidity Benefit rather than Unemployment Benefit. It argues that changes to the criteria for receiving Unemployment Benefit made it harder to receive. The paper also says that people who were near retirement age were possibly incentivised to stay on Invalidity Benefit because they could claim the benefit for five years after their retirement, and unlike the state pension, it was not taxed. However, critics of this theory argued that claimants often had to undergo a medical examination by a Benefits Agency doctor and cases were reviewed regularly, sometimes leading to benefits being withdrawn from valid claimants.

==== Use of Invalidity Benefit to conceal unemployment levels ====
There have been claims that the government was using Invalidity Benefit to lower the unemployment statistics. A report by Sheffield Hallam University showed that Invalidity Benefit claims started to rise when unemployment rose in the late 1970s and early 1980s, and argued that this indicated that many claimants were not too unwell or disabled to work, as the number of people with serious illnesses and disabilities would be expected to be constant. An earlier paper by two of the same authors made a similar argument, and showed that people living in areas where there had been a high number of job losses (such as traditional industrial areas) had the biggest growth in people claiming Invalidity Benefit. As well as this, a paper published in the Journal of Public Health Medicine argued that people with mild mental disorders were increasingly likely to claim Invalidity Benefit, and showed that the rate of people claiming Invalidity Benefit where their main disability was depression or anxiety had grown rapidly between 1985 and 1995, but that there was a much smaller increase in claims over the same period for potentially more disabling mental disorders, such as psychosis. The author claimed that this supported the view that the government was using Invalidity Benefit to conceal unemployment levels.

=== Role of GPs in assessing fitness to work ===
Applicants to Invalidity Benefit were required to provide a sick note from their GP, which would describe why the claimant was unable to work. For the first 6 months of the claim, the GP was required only to consider if they could return to their usual occupation. However, after six months they had to consider if the claimant was unfit for any other kind of work and therefore eligible for long term invalidity benefits.

An editorial in the British Journal of General Practice published in 1990 argued that GPs felt pressured into giving patients sick notes because they did not have time to fully assess the patient's fitness to work, which was contributing to the rise in Invalidity Benefit claims.

=== Reforms ===
In October 1992, the Conservative Secretary of State for Social Security, Peter Lilley, delivered a speech at the Tory conference where he promised to "close down the something for nothing society". He delivered this through a parody of Gilbert and Sullivan's "little list" song from The Mikado.

I've got a little list / Of benefit offenders who I'll soon be rooting out / And who never would be missed / They never would be missed. /
There's those who make up bogus claims / In half a dozen names / And councillors who draw the dole / To run left-wing campaigns / They never would be missed / They never would be missed. /
There's young ladies who get pregnant just to jump the housing queue / And dads who won't support the kids / of ladies they have ... kissed / And I haven't even mentioned all those sponging socialists / I've got them on my list / And they'll none of them be missed / They'll none of them be missed.

In June 1993, The Independent obtained leaked documents where Lilley laid out plans to cut eligibility to Invalidity Benefit, cutting the amount paid out, and making the benefit taxable. The change in eligibility was expected to exclude around 30,000 - 60,000 claimants.

In November 1994, Lilley announced in Parliament that due to an increase in Invalidity Benefit claims there would be a tightening of the administration of the benefit and that claimants may be subject to stronger action when found unfit for work.

=== Abolishment ===
In 1995, Lilley closed Invalidity Benefit to new claims and replaced it with Incapacity Benefit. The Prime Minister of the day, John Major, had complained about the burgeoning caseload, saying: "Frankly, it beggars belief that so many more people have suddenly become invalids, especially at a time when the health of the population has improved".

== Eligibility ==
Men under the age of 65 and women under 60 were entitled to claim Invalidity Benefit. To be eligible for Invalidity Benefit, claimants needed to have claimed a short-term sickness benefit, such as Statutory Sick Pay for 28 weeks prior to the claim and have paid National Insurance contributions. The claimant's age and qualifications were taken into consideration when deciding if the claimant was capable of working.

== Payment ==
Invalidity Benefit consisted of three components:

- Invalidity Pension, which was paid at the same rate as the state pension.
- Invalidity Allowance, which was an additional payment for people under 50 years old. This was only available to people who started claiming the benefit before 1985.
- Additional Pension, which was for people who belonged to an occupational pension scheme or State Earnings-Related Pension Scheme (SERPS) and related to their earnings since the 6 April 1978.

Invalidity Benefit was paid at a higher rate than the unemployment benefit paid to people without disabilities. People who had been on Invalidity Benefit for more than one year were paid the long-term scale rate. The table below shows the amount claimants were paid.

Invalidity Benefit payment rates per week in the 1990-1991 financial year
	Invalidity Pension	Invalidity Allowance	Additional Pension
Claimant	£46.90	£10 (under 40 years old) £6.20 (between 40 and 50 years old)	Varied according to earnings prior to April 1978 and membership of SERPs or occupational pension
Spouse	£28.20 (only paid if the spouse earned less than £37.35 per week)		
Dependent Children	£9.65 per child		
