= Criticism of Employment Support Allowance =

UK social security controversy

Criticism of the Work Capability Assessment, used by the Department for Work and Pensions in the United Kingdom, to assess and reassess claimants of Employment and Support Allowance or enhanced rate Universal Credit, has been wide-ranging, from the procedure itself, to the financial cost of using both Atos and Maximus to assess claimants. Other criticisms discuss the level of deaths, suicides and high overturn rates at tribunals that the WCA has caused.

== Criticism of Atos ==
=== Quality issues with Atos ===
On 22 July 2013, the DWP announced that it had recently "directed" Atos to "put in place a quality improvement plan following a DWP audit which identified an unacceptable reduction in the quality of written reports produced following assessments."

The statutory independent report for parliament on the operational performance of the WCA in 2013 dealt with the 'quality improvement plan' in one sentence:

Following a recent audit which showed an unacceptable reduction in the quality of assessment reports, the Department agreed a quality improvement plan...

The DWP said it had carried out an unscheduled and "urgent" audit in "April/May [sic] 2013" that looked at reports written over the six months to March, in which time Atos had furnished the DWP with more than 300,000 reports. The DWP said it had found 164 reports that its in-house medical staff had said had scored only a 'C' for quality. However, during the period in question, the 164 reports had been deemed adequate by the department's on-the-ground decision-makers, who had used them to decide on claimants' entitlement to ESA — unacceptable reports are returned to the outsourcer for what the DWP calls "a rework".

The department's press release tried to explain the paradox:

A 'C' grade report does not mean the assessment was wrong, and the recommendation given in a 'C' grade report may well be correct, but, for example, their reasoning for reaching that recommendation may lack the level of detail demanded by the DWP.

=== High cost of Atos contract ===
The Public Accounts Committee of MPs chaired by Margaret Hodge heard evidence that over the previous financial year, Atos had been paid £112 million to carry out 738,000 assessments. At that time, 38% of appeals to tribunals were successful and the committee's view was that too many wrong decisions were being made, only for the decisions to be overturned later (while Atos was paid by the DWP, it was the Ministry of Justice that paid for the tribunal appeals, with £500 million being the potential cost of these appeals over ten years). Hodge said that the DWP got "far too many decisions wrong on claimants' ability to work...at considerable cost to the taxpayer" and added that this can "create misery and hardship to the claimants themselves". She also remarked: "We saw no evidence that the Department was applying sufficient rigour or challenge to Atos given the vulnerability of many of its clients, the size of the contract and its role as a near monopoly supplier. We are concerned that the profitability of the contract may be disproportionate to the limited risks which the contractor bears" and concluded: "The Department's got to get a grip of this contract!".

The Office for Budget Responsibility found that between 2011 and 2014, no savings at all had been made in the sickness benefit budget, which remained at more than £13 billion a year. Furthermore, because many more claimants than forecast were being placed in the Support Group, the government's fiscal watchdog raised its estimate for spending on ESA from 2014 by one billion pounds a year.

== Criticism of Maximus ==
=== Failure to meet volume targets ===
Within six months of taking over the contract, the DWP expected Maximus to have the capacity to carry out one million assessments a year. This was intended to clear the backlog and then allow the department to order hundreds of thousands of reassessments of people who had already been granted ESA, in the belief that many would have recovered from their illness and so could be taken off benefits. Repeated assessments were one of four key tenets of ESA from the very beginning, but the programme had to be put on hold in early 2014.

At the end of October 2015, the DWP's director-general of finance was bullish about hitting this higher target when he appeared before a parliamentary committee, saying: "We are confident that [Maximus] will over-achieve the amounts of work over and above the forecast that was set".

But at the start of November, Maximus's senior management team warned its shareholders that certain performance metrics, most notably volume targets, were not being met and the challenges with the WCA contract resulted in reduced earnings outlook for fiscal year 2016. For fiscal year 2015, the contract had generated at least 35 million dollars less than expected. The company additionally stated that although recruitment of healthcare professionals had improved, their training and retention was still a problem, with a shortfall of assessors expected to last until the autumn of 2016.

On the same day, the price of shares in the company fell sharply, losing more than 20% of their value.

=== High cost of Maximus contract ===
In January 2016, the National Audit Office (NAO) published its evaluation of the DWP's health and disability assessment contracts. It said the cost of each WCA had risen from £115 under Atos to £190 under Maximus.

The report went on to say that Maximus was facing "significant challenges with staff failing to complete training requirements" and revealed that in July 2015 - less than six months into the new contract - the DWP had been obliged to draw up a 'performance improvement plan' with Maximus because "volume targets were not being met".

The NAO also declared that the DWP had "allowed bidders to make assumptions about staff training that it knew were overly optimistic and difficult to achieve" and implied that the target set by the DWP of one million assessments a year was too ambitious, saying: "One experienced bidder withdrew from the process because it could not meet the required number of assessments". The next month, the most senior official in the DWP told a parliamentary committee that of all the bidders for the WCA contract, only Maximus and one other unnamed firm had submitted bids that anticipated hitting the DWP's ambitious new target.

== Criticism of assessment credibility ==
Apart from questions arising from the substantial proportion of 'fit for work' recommendations that have been disregarded by decision-makers or overturned by tribunals or by the DWP itself, concerns about the reliability of the WCA as an indicator of fitness for work have arisen from a number of other sources. The Work Programme firms responsible for training people in the Work-Related Activity Group said they had "ongoing concerns about the accuracy of the WCA" and rated earlier improvements to the WCA as only "4 or 5 out of 10".

=== Outcome targets ===
Professor Malcolm Harrington, the first external reviewer of the operation of the WCA, was asked by a parliamentary committee whether he had ever found any evidence that Atos assessors had been put under pressure to reach targets. He replied:

They say not, and whenever I have gone anywhere, they say not. This is purely anecdotal, but there was one Atos assessment centre I went to where the bosses walked out and I was left with a couple of assessors having a cup of coffee at the end of the session, and they told me they were under pressure.

In 2012, a GP posed as a trainee Atos assessor and recorded undercover video footage that was later broadcast by Channel 4's investigative current affairs programme Dispatches. In the film, trainers warned the NHS doctor that if on average he were to recommend more than one disabled person per day for the Support Group, he would be subject to an increased level of management scrutiny through a mechanism known as "targeted audit". The undercover doctor was told:

If it's more than I think 12% or 13%, you will be fed back 'your rate is too high'

An assessor on "targeted audit" would also no longer be allowed to recommend a claimant for the Support Group without asking an authorised colleague for permission to do so. When the doctor asked an experienced assessor where these rules had come from, she replied: "DWP".

Both the DWP and Atos categorically denied ever having had any target for getting claimants off sickness benefits. However, both eventually admitted that Support Group "norms" were being used nationwide, though they both denied that the purpose of "targeted audit" was to limit the number of claimants placed in the Support Group. Atos said that the audit process triggered by the breach of a "norm" was intended to ensure consistency across the firm's UK team: if the assessor's reports met the DWP's expectations, the healthcare professional would not be asked to change their recommendations.

In the phase from the inception of the WCA in October 2008 to November 2010, only new claims for ESA were assessed. A 'norm' of 1 in 8 or 12.5% was in use as the benchmark for targeted audit during the Incapacity Benefit reassessment programme, suggesting that the DWP was expecting a very similar proportion of claimants to be recommended for the Support Group overall. However, Professor Harrington has described the set of people making fresh claims as "a completely different group of people" from long-term recipients, who generally have a significantly higher level of disability than new claimants. Moreover, studies of long-term Incapacity Benefit recipients carried out by the DWP before the 'roll out' of the Incapacity Benefit reassessment programme suggested that 31% of established recipients - almost 1 in 3 - would be suitable for the Support Group. Despite this, the 'norm' does not appear to have been adjusted upwards to reflect the more severe disabilities experienced by the people being tested from 2011 onwards.

In 2013, the Work Programme's training providers - outsourcing companies who coach and train people put into the Work-Related Activity Group after their WCA - complained that claimants who were "clearly unfit for any type of work-related activity" were nonetheless being put in the Work-Related Activity Group rather than the Support Group, and that "claimants with terminal cancer, whose life expectancies were shorter than the work-ready prognosis" had been referred to them for pre-employment training.

Much later, a Green Paper provided more evidence that a de facto outcome target had been in use. In 2016 the government conceded that:

At the time Employment and Support Allowance was implemented in 2008 it was assumed that less than 10% of those having a Work Capability Assessment would go into the Support Group and that, as a result of [the extra help to find work given to people in the Work-Related Activity Group], there was an aspiration that one million fewer people would be on incapacity benefits by 2015. In practice, over the last 12 months, we have seen on average 50% of people going into the Support Group.

In December 2016, the DWP released data on outcomes covering the first quarter of that year: then, for the small number of Incapacity Benefit recipients undergoing a WCA for the first time, the percentage being placed in the Support Group after their assessment was 87%, while 39% of new claimants qualified for the Support Group immediately after their WCA.

=== Expert opinion ===
When Atos gave its reasons for seeking to exit the contract to carry out the assessment, the firm announced that it had come to the conclusion that "in its current form, the WCA is not working for claimants, for DWP or for Atos Healthcare".

Conversely, Dr Paul Litchfield, who advised the DWP on the performance of the WCA in 2013 and 2014, described the test he had helped to design as "by no means perfect" but nevertheless adequate. However, in 2014 he cautioned that: "We have taken the WCA about as far as it can sensibly go in terms of modification and adjustment".

Professor Dame Carol Black advised the government on back-to-work policy between 2006 and 2016. She said of the WCA: "I don't think anyone thinks it has been a success", describing it as "badly placed" and too far from when the first sick note or fit-note is penned.

=== United Nations report ===
In November 2016, the United Nations Committee on the Rights of Persons with Disabilities published its report on the situation facing disabled people in the United Kingdom. Of the WCA, it said:

Evidence indicates several flaws in the processes related to the Employment and Support Allowance. In particular, the Committee notes that, despite several adjustments made to the Work Capability Assessment, the assessment has continued to be focused on a functional evaluation of skills and capabilities, and puts aside personal circumstances and needs, and barriers faced by persons with disabilities to return to employment, particularly those of persons with intellectual and/or psychosocial disabilities.

The DWP responded by saying that promoting and enabling work for persons with disabilities was a high priority and it described the various ways it was trying to bring this about. The department emphasised its hopes for the future, especially the aspirations outlined in its recent Green Paper.

=== Politicians' assessments ===
In 2015, Iain Duncan Smith complained that the system gave doctors a "binary choice", not an opportunity to deliver a more nuanced opinion on claimants' fitness for work.

In April 2016, the new Welfare Secretary, Stephen Crabb, said that the WCA had "never worked as intended. The WCA was a mess, it didn't recognise mental health issues and other types of disability".

Later the same year, the Shadow Secretary of State for Work and Pensions, Debbie Abrahams, said the test her party had described as "tough but fair" in 2010 had been "discredited".

In late October 2016, when appearing on Question Time, the president of the Liberal Democrats, Baroness Sal Brinton, described the WCA as "not fit for purpose", adding "this process absolutely fails" and "we need to get rid of it". On the same BBC programme, Keir Starmer QC, a former director of public prosecutions, said:

It is time for a real review of how these assessments are actually working.

In September 2016, Damian Green, the latest welfare secretary, was asked by the BBC's Andrew Marr about the deaths of specific benefit claimants:

You know these cases, they must be on your desk, you've been [at the DWP] over the summer, when you look at them, are you completely satisfied yourself that the government has done this right in the past? Do you want to look again at any of these cases and think again about the way disabled people are assessed for work?

In reply, the Secretary of State acknowledged that "obviously there are individual cases where it looks as though the system is not working". Marr asked once more: "Are you going to look again at the way people have been assessed generally to see if it has been as fair and humane as [...] you would like it to be?" Green replied:

I am permanently looking at all these systems. And of course, there are tens of thousands of these assessments going on all the time. There will, I dare say, be individual cases that are wrong and as they are brought to the attention of ministers we look at them.

== High overturn rate in independent tribunals ==
Between 2011 and 2013 around 40% of claimants found 'fit for work' appealed to a tribunal and around 40% of those appeals were successful. The number of external appeals dropped markedly over the course of 2013, although most appellants who do reach the tribunal stage now see their 'fit for work' decision overturned.

During 2012, a parliamentary committee heard evidence from welfare advisors that, in nearly two out of three successful appeals to tribunals against fit-for-work decisions, appellants were seeing their points rise from zero in the original assessments – meaning that the original WCA had detected no relevant disabilities at all – to at least 15 points after the tribunals had independently assessed their claims. Parliament's Office of Science and Technology analysed the WCA's performance and found that "the number of fit-for-work decisions being overturned on appeal has led to questions about the reliability of the assessment process".

=== Confusion between successful appeal figures ===
Critics of the WCA often say that more than 50% of appeals are successful, while the DWP suggests that only 15% of decisions are overturned. Both are technically correct. Independent tribunals do now overturn more than half of the appeals that come before them. However, even in the busy years for tribunals — 2011 to 2013 — this only represented 15% of all the 'fit for work' decisions ultimately made by the DWP. The apparent discrepancy arises because some people don't launch an appeal to a tribunal and because some of those who do appeal are unsuccessful.

The tribunal is the very end of the process. Some 'fit for work' recommendations are disregarded by the DWP and some initial decisions are overturned on formal reconsideration by the DWP, which leaves a smaller proportion of lingering 'false negatives' to be overturned by independent tribunals.

A 2012 study of 28,000 tribunal hearings analysed the reasons for overturning the DWP's decisions:

- In almost two-thirds of successful appeals, the tribunals found the appellants' descriptions of their difficulties, given in person on the day of the tribunal, sufficiently convincing for them to be awarded the benefit — known as presenting "cogent oral evidence" in legal jargon. By implication, in these cases, the tribunal found the oral evidence more persuasive than had the assessor who had conducted the original face-to-face assessment
- In nearly a quarter of successful appeals, the tribunals agreed with the DWP on the facts of the case but decided that the DWP had come to the wrong conclusion based on those facts
- In 13% of cases, documentary evidence was provided that had not been available at the initial assessment
- In under 1% of cases, the assessment report was found to contain important technical errors.

== Potential bias ==
In May 2013, a doctor who had recently resigned from Atos blew the whistle on biases in the testing process, telling the BBC:

These assessments need to be done independently, impartially, considering all the evidence and with proper use of medical knowledge – and that's just not happening at the moment. Pressure is being put on healthcare professionals in many cases to come up with a particular outcome, really regardless of the facts of the case

He claimed that:

- At the face-to-face assessment, the strength of a case was often not weighed as it should have been — on the balance of probabilities — but to a loosely defined and higher standard of proof, so claimants faced "an uphill struggle" to establish legitimate claims
- Atos made too little effort, before an assessment, to obtain clinical information that could have a bearing on the case
- The DWP was "skewing" the WCA in its favour — "pulling strings behind the scenes" by manipulating the training curriculum and the audit protocols it stipulated for the medical assessors who furnished the department with recommendations on claimants' fitness for work

The news report drew particular attention to misleading interpretations of the test's eligibility criteria that the doctor claimed were being taught to new assessors as off-the-record rules of thumb during their initial classroom training (and used as benchmarks when assessors' reports were audited). An Atos executive interviewed by the BBC acknowledged that the guidance referred to "might seem somewhat odd" but said it had been "taken out of context" and was part of a much bigger set of questions considered during assessments.

On the same day, an Atos spokesperson made it clear that the training curriculum was set by the DWP and duly followed by Atos, stating: "We do not deviate from government guidelines in our training".

=== Ministerial response ===
The Employment Minister was asked by the BBC about the allegations of bias but he replied with a general explanation of the principles underpinning the Incapacity Benefit reassessment programme. Tom Greatrex MP wrote to the Prime Minister to bring to his attention the whistleblower's allegations that the core assessment was "skewed against the claimant". Downing Street made no reply but simply passed the letter back to the DWP, which issued a non-specific statement.

In July, the former assessor gave an interview to The Guardian. In it, he described how he had first heard trainers advocating the "bogus" interpretations of the test's descriptors in 2011 during a one-day conversion course covering the new version of the WCA and its new criteria. In response to the article's description of auditors instructing assessors — at the point when a report of a face-to-face assessment had been written, but had not yet been sent to the DWP — to alter their reports and reduce the number of points awarded, Atos said:

There is no ethical conflict in advising a doctor that aspects of their work require further attention to meet the standards expected

=== Reaction from Atos auditors ===
Some assessors with several years' experience of carrying out disability assessments were chosen by Atos to audit the work of their colleagues. Their main role was to give feedback to new recruits who had passed their initial classroom training but who had not yet been accredited by the DWP and allowed to 'fly solo'. Auditors would also check the reports of accredited assessors, if the assessors were putting more claimants than expected into the Support Group - a process known as "targeted audit".

Although the whole of a report would be broadly scrutinised, the thrust of an audit was to ensure that the report had been written according to the standards stipulated by the firm's customer - the DWP - and largely focussed on three things:

- The report should include as many examples as possible of activities taken from the claimant's description of their day-to-day life that corroborated the points score awarded by the assessor
- The summary should be an overview of the whole report and should try to explain how the recommendation on fitness for work had been reached
- The assessor's interpretation of the test's criteria should match that taught in training.

=== Explanation ===
In August, the whistleblower expanded on his allegations in a first-hand account published by the British Medical Journal. He suggested that the DWP's alleged actions might have been at least partly driven by pressure to "reduce government debt". The DWP's senior doctors made no reply but the clinical director of Atos did respond. In relation to the claim that some Atos assessors had been led to interpret the test's criteria too harshly, she did not deny that the "bogus rules of thumb" had been used in training talks but she said that assessors were expected to follow the written guidance contained in the 255-page instruction manual issued to all assessors:

All reports must fully comply with the Department for Work and Pensions guidance contained within the WCA Handbook; all our practitioners are expected to be fully aware of this guidance and are responsible for ensuring that the advice they offer complies with it.

The foreword to the WCA Handbook states:

This Handbook is not a stand-alone document, and forms only a part of the training and written documentation that a Healthcare Professional receives. As disability assessment is a practical occupation, much of the guidance also involves verbal information and coaching.

== Lack of appropriateness for Incapacity Benefit reassessment ==
The reassessment programme was dogged by problems: handling of the contract was criticised by the National Audit Office and by the Public Accounts Committee, which described the DWP's project management style as "complacent"; the overhaul of the WCA by medically qualified civil servants produced what seemed to be a more stringent version of the test, but outside experts warned it was flawed; thousands of appeals were launched each month, swamping the tribunals service and leading to long delays; in 2013, accusations of bias, questions about quality and a contractual dispute caused the process to stall; and the DWP's attempts to restart the reassessment programme in 2015 were hampered by a shortage of healthcare professionals willing and able to carry out the test.

During the reassessment programme, more than 50,000 vulnerable people successfully appealed to independent tribunals after wrongly being declared fit for work. The number of people choosing to appeal fell dramatically in 2013, although the summer of that year saw a cluster of well-documented deaths of people who had recently had their benefits cut after being declared fit for work. At inquests, coroners have raised concerns about information-gathering prior to face-to-face assessments, and there is epidemiological evidence to indicate that the 'roll out' of the WCA has been associated with hundreds of deaths.

An independent review undertaken by occupational heath expert Professor Malcolm Harrington, a small team from the DWP, along with an Independent Scrutiny Group that included the National Clinical Adviser to the Care Quality Commission and the chief executive of the mental health charity MIND, gave a negative report of the WCA's usability, with The Guardian summarising Professor Harrington's opinion as being that the test was "impersonal", it "lacked empathy" and it was too reliant on "computer systems and drop-down menus". In the executive summary of his report, he wrote that he "found that the WCA is not working as well as it should. There are clear and consistent criticisms of the whole system and much negativity surrounding the process...[but] I do not believe the system is broken or beyond repair. I am proposing a substantial series of recommendations to improve the fairness and effectiveness of the WCA. If adopted, I believe these changes can have a positive impact on the process."

He made 25 recommendations, with his changes he advised to the core assessment being:

- The criteria for judging mental function and cognitive ability should be refined
- "Champions" should be identified within Atos to spread best practice for gauging mental and cognitive disabilities
- Each report should be summarised in plain English
- The claim form should be redrafted.

== Deaths and suicides blamed on WCA ==
The DWP accepts that being found fit for work and ineligible for sickness benefit can, in some circumstances, harm a recipient's physical or mental health. For this reason, one of the WCA's eligibility criteria — the non-functional descriptor Substantial Risk — applies where there is, on balance, more than a small risk of harm if the claimant were to be declared 'fit for work'. In these circumstances, the at-risk person should be given the benefit.

=== Post-mortem case reviews ===
The DWP has looked into the deaths of at least 49 benefit claimants. Most died after undergoing a WCA. The department was compelled to publish their findings in May 2016 after a campaign by Disability News Service. The conclusions of the heavily redacted reports included:

1. A "persistent area of possible concern" was "a dislocation between policy intent and what actually happens to claimants who may be vulnerable"
2. The Incapacity Benefit reassessment programme lacked a clear system for identifying vulnerable recipients
3. DWP staff did not always check the DWP's database for indicators that claimants were at risk
4. The WCA's medical criteria for identifying risk were not properly applied
5. Claimants with cognitive problems were not filling in their claim forms in the manner that the DWP had envisaged (or at all)
6. Requests by claimants for a reconsideration of the department's initial decision - while waiting for which, the claimant receives no sickness benefit - were not prioritised in a "common sense" way
7. Appeal dates for tribunals took too long
8. The failure to apply the department's Six Point Plan for dealing with people with suicidal ideas was "a recurring theme"

=== Inquests and media reports ===
There have been several media reports of unexpected deaths after assessments where the claimants seem to have been at risk of harm if found fit for work. The most widely reported deaths followed assessments that took place in the seven months from December 2012 to June 2013. The deaths themselves were clustered around the summer of 2013:

- Tim Salter (assessed December 2012; deceased September 2013)
- Linda Wootton (assessed February 2013; deceased April 2013)
- Mark Wood (assessed March 2013; deceased August 2013)
- Michael O'Sullivan (assessed March 2013; deceased September 2013)
- David Barr (assessed June 2013; deceased August 2013)

==== Tim Salter ====
Tim Salter was visually impaired as a result of brain damage from a previous suicide attempt. He killed himself after being found fit for work. At his inquest, the coroner said: "A major factor in his death was that his state benefits had been greatly reduced, leaving him almost destitute and with threatened repossession of his home".

==== Linda Wootton ====
Linda Wootton had undergone two heart-and-lung transplants and was left with a weakened immune system caused by the immunosuppressant therapy she was taking to prevent her body rejecting the transplanted organs. She died days after the DWP upheld its decision to declare her 'fit for work' (neither the assessor, the first decision-maker nor the second official who reviewed her case had deemed her to be at substantial risk of harm).

==== Mark Wood ====
Mark Wood was receiving Incapacity Benefit and Disability Living Allowance because of long-term mental health problems, including a "phobia" of some types of food and overvalued concerns about his food's freedom from contamination. He had been losing weight for many months before his WCA. He died, weighing 35 kg, after he was declared fit for work and his Incapacity Benefit and Housing Benefit were stopped (the DWP continued to pay him Disability Living Allowance). His family believes that the stress of his forthcoming WCA and then afterwards the loss of the bulk of his income damaged his already fragile mental state, worsened what the DWP called his "eating disorder" and so contributed to his death.

The Oxfordshire Coroner delivered a narrative verdict in which he said the final pathological event was "unascertained", but he saw no significant evidence of neglect or self-neglect (neglect has a very precise legal definition), suicide, or unlawful killing (for which a high evidence threshold must be crossed before a coroner can deliver it as a verdict).

The DWP carried out a post-mortem case review then admitted that the decision to declare him fit for work had been wrong, but the department denied that its decision had contributed to his death.

In response to the case, Tom Pollard of the mental health charity Mind said:

Unfortunately this tragic case is not an isolated incident. We hear too often how changes to benefits are negatively impacting vulnerable individuals, who struggle to navigate a complex, and increasingly punitive, system. We know the assessment process for those applying for employment and support allowance is very stressful, and too crude to accurately assess the impact a mental health problem has on someone's ability to work. This leads to people not getting the right support and being put under excessive pressure which can make their health worse and push them further from the workplace. We urgently need to see a complete overhaul of the system, to ensure nobody else falls through the cracks.

==== Michael O'Sullivan ====
Michael O'Sullivan had long-term depression and anxiety and was receiving sickness benefit in the form of Income Support until it was stopped by the DWP following a WCA. He committed suicide after being on Jobseekers Allowance for six months. After the inquest, the coroner said: "The intense anxiety that triggered his suicide was caused by his recent assessment...as being fit for work". The assessor — a former orthopaedic surgeon — admitted during the inquest that he had not fully explored the risk of suicide at the face-to-face assessment, despite suicidal ideation being described on the claim form.

The coroner wrote to the DWP in January 2014. She was concerned that neither the Atos doctor nor the DWP decision-maker had sought information from Michael O'Sullivan's own doctors. The DWP wrote back, referring to the guidance issued to the Atos healthcare professionals who, before face-to-face assessments, scrutinised the paperwork submitted by claimants — guidance called the Training and Development ESA Filework Guidelines. The DWP confirmed that suicidal thoughts had been described on Michael O'Sullivan's application form but said "further evidence was not requested in line with the stated policy [in the Training and Development ESA Filework Guidelines] where the claimant has referred to suicidal ideation". These policy guidelines say: "Where there is evidence of a previous suicide attempt, suicidal ideation, or self-harm expressed in the [information on the claim form], the healthcare professional must request further medical evidence".

The DWP said the specific action it would take in response to the coroner's concerns was to issue a reminder to the relevant members of staff. Michael O'Sullivan's daughter's MP said:

The coroner said there was a causal link between his intense anxiety, the assessment and the consequences. His daughter has been asking for answers to how that happened, what went wrong...and she hasn't got answers for three years...it really deserves to be looked at.

The case had many similarities with an earlier death following a WCA, where a coroner had also written to the DWP about the lack of an attempt to contact the psychiatrist who had been treating a person with mental health problems who went on to commit suicide.

==== David Barr ====
David Barr had paranoid delusions and had a history of self-harm. He was taking anti-psychotic medication prescribed by his psychiatrist. He jumped from a bridge to his death after a risk assessment — by a physiotherapist — that led the DWP to deny his claim for ESA. The department later admitted that its decision was wrong; it said he should have been categorised as being at substantial risk of harm.

=== Epidemiology ===
A study published in the Journal of Epidemiology and Community Health in November 2015 found an independent correlation between the deployment of the Incapacity Benefit reassessment programme in England and an increase in reported mental health problems, higher levels of antidepressant prescribing and 590 additional suicides. The DWP responded by pointing out that association does not imply causation: the rise in mental health issues when the WCA was deployed after 2010 could have been caused by something else entirely and the temporal association with the reassessment programme could just have been a coincidence. The researchers said they had found no other explanation for the rise.

=== Deaths after WCAs ===
In response to a campaign using the Freedom of Information Act, the Information Commissioner ordered the DWP to disclose the number of people who had died in the 12 months after their WCA since May 2010 – the DWP had sought to withhold this information, arguing variously that it was too time-consuming, the department was about to publish it anyway or it would not be in the public interest because the data might be misinterpreted. But in August 2015, the DWP was forced to reveal that between December 2011 and February 2014, 2,380 claimants had died after being declared fit for work. However, as Dr Ben Goldacre has explained, an imprecise question in the original FOI request and an unhelpful DWP response — which Goldacre characterised as "essentially a PDF and an excel spreadsheet full of red herrings" — meant that no firm conclusion could be drawn from these figures alone about whether the death rate of people found fit for work is any higher or lower than expected.

=== Deaths and claims ending ===
DWP figures show that, between January and November 2011, 10,600 sick and disabled people died within six weeks of their benefit claim ending; many disability campaigners believe that these deaths occurred after — and even because — the claimants were declared fit for work. The Daily Telegraph has questioned this: it posits that the 10,600 deaths include people who happened to die from natural causes, after which their benefit payments ceased. The newspaper said that when the DWP states "within six weeks", this "does not mean 'within the following six weeks': it means 'within six weeks either side'. What that means is that the large, presumably overwhelming, majority of those 10,600 people died, and then their claims ended because they were dead."

=== United Nations report ===
In November 2016, the United Nations Committee on the Rights of Persons with Disabilities published its report on the situation facing disabled people in the United Kingdom. Of deaths after WCAs, it said:

The [DWP] initially stated that it did not monitor deaths that occurred after assessments. Evidence gathered during the inquiry indicated that, in 2012 and 2015, such information was released by the Department for Work and Pensions following freedom of information requests. Additionally, information originated from official sources indicated that 33 deaths of claimants who died after being assessed were examined. The [DWP] claims there is no causal link. The Committee is not aware of any attempts at objective, thorough, open and impartial investigation regarding those deaths by an independent body.

The DWP responded by confirming that it did not systematically monitor or investigate deaths following WCAs. It admitted that it had reviewed the deaths of at least 49 claimants, but said it only did this a): when formally notified of a death by "a family member or solicitor", and b): where a link between the death and the DWP's actions has been alleged by the family member or their legal advocate. The department said that an internal review might "make recommendations for possible improvements" but would not "seek out or apportion blame" (internal reviews have though been used by the DWP to deny any culpability for deaths following WCAs).

The DWP drew the committee's attention to the role of the coroner in England and Wales.

== Inappropriate assessment cases ==
As the backlog shrank towards zero and the programme to reassess established ESA claimants got going again, the WCA process attracted more negative headlines in February 2016 after the DWP initiated reassessment proceedings against a military veteran in the advanced stages of Alzheimer's disease.
