= Social Security Appeal Tribunal =

The Social Security Appeal Tribunal was a tribunal in the United Kingdom which heard appeals from decisions made by the Department for Work and Pensions, HM Revenue and Customs and local authorities regarding entitlement to various forms of social security benefits.

== History ==
In 1984, supplementary benefit appeal tribunals and National Insurance local tribunals were merged into Social Security Appeal Tribunal.

The Tribunal was abolished in November 2008 and its functions transferred to the First-tier Tribunal.
