= Work Capability Assessment =

Assessment for disability welfare in United Kingdom

The Work Capability Assessment (WCA) is used by the British Government's Department for Work and Pensions (DWP) to decide whether and to what extent welfare benefit claimants are capable of doing work or work-related activities. The outcome of the assessment also determines whether claimants are entitled to "new style" Employment and Support Allowance (ESA) and potentially additional elements of Universal Credit (UC).

== Assessment process ==
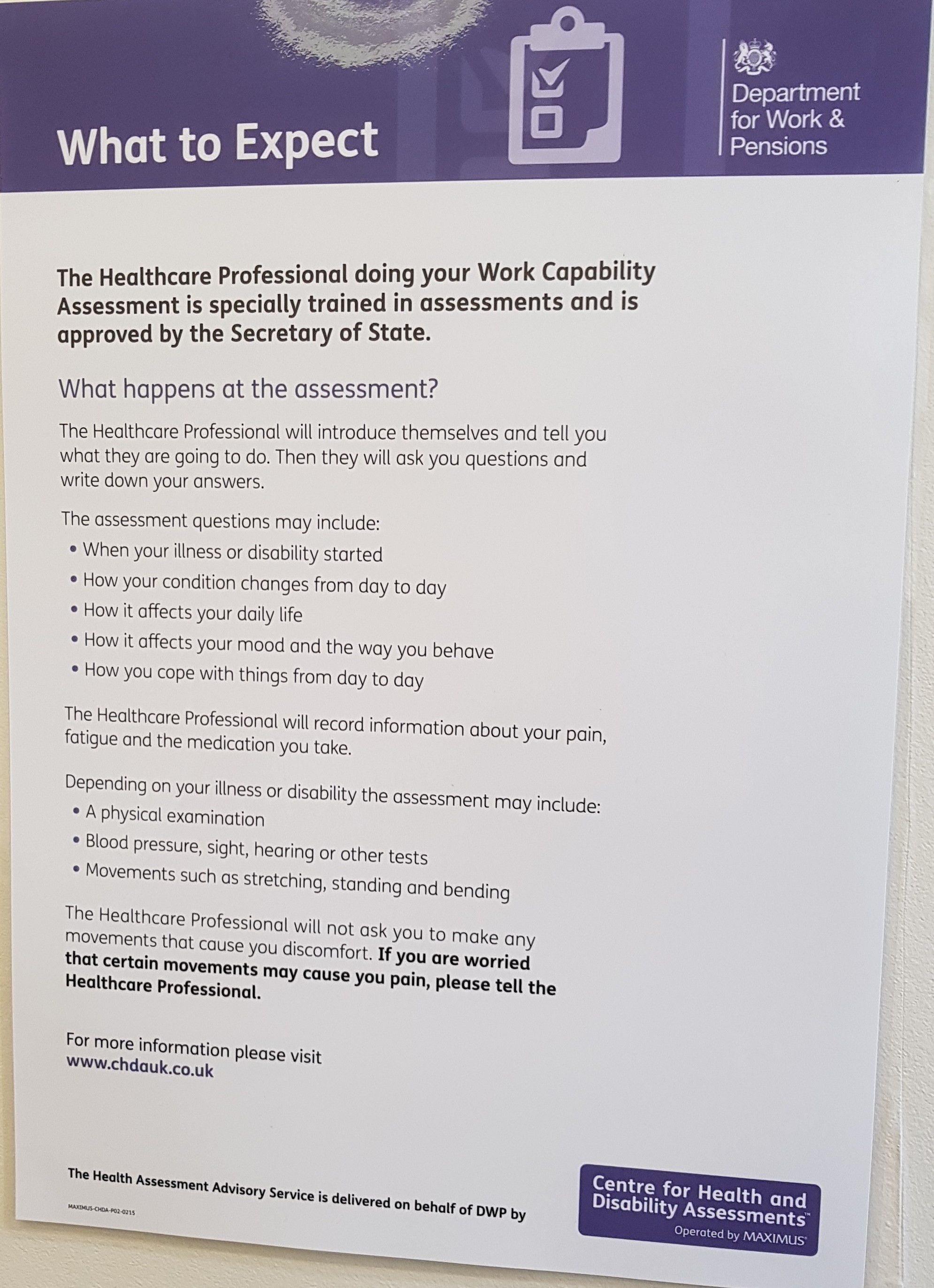
Work Capability Assessment – What to expect

The process is ultimately a legal one that uses social security legislation as its main reference point (which is why appeals are made to tribunals overseen by the Ministry of Justice). The standard of proof used is 'the balance of probabilities': a claim should be accepted if it is more likely than not that the claimant has a significant disability.

The main assessment process starts as soon as can be arranged after 13 weeks from the initial claim, when a healthcare professional approved by the DWP scrutinises the claim form and decides whether to seek further evidence from the claimant's GP or another appropriate source. From July 2022 nurses, occupational therapists, pharmacists, and physiotherapists as well as doctors can legally certify fit notes across England, Scotland and Wales.

If the evidence shows that, on balance, according to the legally defined criteria of the test, the claimant could not reasonably be expected to work or prepare for work, then a face-to-face assessment should not be necessary, the claimant should be recommended for the Support Group, and the higher rate of ESA usually granted. Otherwise, the healthcare professional arranges a face-to-face assessment – usually in an examination centre, but occasionally in the claimant's home.

Since 2015, testing has been performed by the US outsourcing firm Maximus. The DWP pays Maximus £200 for each report.

At the face-to-face assessments, the assessors – who are nurses, doctors or physiotherapists – are guided and prompted by a computer programme, designed by Atos in conjunction with the DWP, called the 'Logic-integrated Medical Assessment' or 'LiMA'. A large amount of lifestyle data and some clinical information is obtained from the claimant and is entered into the computer by the assessor, mostly by selecting pre-determined 'one click' options from an on-screen menu. As the assessment progresses, LiMA tries to gauge both the impact of the disability on the person's daily life and the person's fitness for work – but while LiMA suggests options to the assessor, it is ultimately the healthcare professional who is responsible for making the recommendations. The healthcare professional also draws on their medical knowledge gained from working in a clinical environment earlier in their career to:

- Answer factual questions that have a bearing on eligibility, such as: "Is the claimant receiving intravenous therapy?"
- Explore the medical history
- Deliver clinical judgements, such as on whether the claimant is at substantial risk or terminally ill
- Estimate the date of any future recovery

The strength of a claim is largely determined by comparing the claimant's problem with a framework of set criteria, known as 'descriptors', which are divided into 'functional' and 'non-functional' descriptors.

The healthcare professional's main role is to select the most appropriate descriptor for each activity printed on the ESA claim form that the claimant has marked as being difficult for them in their day-to-day life. To do this, assessors draw on their training in the field of 'functional assessment' – a subspecialty concerned with gauging the practical impact of an impairment on a person's daily life and, in the context of the WCA, on their ability to work.

As well as taking a clinical history and exploring the claimant's 'Typical Day', the healthcare professional will make general observations of the claimant's hearing, mobility and posture, etc. and there may be a short physical examination. The claimant's mental state will to a large degree become apparent as the interview progresses, but specific questions might be asked in order to elucidate any disordered thinking, abnormalities of perception or cognitive impairment. If assessors are unsure how to apply the test's criteria in specific cases, telephone advice is available.

During the face-to-face assessment, if it becomes clear that the claimant qualifies for the Support Group on the grounds of severe functional disability, the interview should be brought to an early close and the finding recorded as a short note on the claimant's file as a recommendation to the DWP decision-maker.

=== Functional descriptors ===
Each functional descriptor comes with a score of 6, 9 or 15 points that is intended to reflect the relative severity of the disability. A total score of 15 points or more will qualify the claimant for ESA. If the healthcare professional deems that none of the functional descriptors apply, the total score will be zero.

Descriptors are grouped into 17 activities. For example, the activity 'Manual Dexterity' – hand function – comes with the following descriptors for the assessor to choose from:

- The claimant cannot use a computer keyboard or mouse (9 points)
- The claimant cannot use a pen (9 points)
- The claimant cannot pick up a small object (15 points)
- The claimant cannot press a button or turn a page (15 points and a place in the Support Group)

Only one descriptor may be chosen for each activity, and it should be the highest-scoring option that still accurately describes the loss of function. Someone who can pick up a small object like a coin but cannot use a pen to make a simple mark will score 9 points for that activity.

If a claimant is capable of carry out a particular action but cannot do so reliably, repeatedly, in a timely manner, safely and without significant pain, they should be treated as being incapable of carrying out that action.

The physical functional descriptors cover these activities:

- Mobilising
- Standing and sitting
- Reaching
- Picking up and moving an object
- Manual dexterity
- Making yourself understood
- Understanding others
- Finding your way around
- Continence
- Consciousness

The mental functional descriptors cover:

- Learning tasks
- Hazard awareness
- Planning and problem-solving
- Coping with change
- Getting about
- Coping with other people
- Behaviour

A 'top score' in one activity will usually qualify the claimant for the Support Group.

=== Non-functional descriptors ===
The non-functional descriptors have no points attached but instead have a simple 'yes' or 'no' answer:

- Is the claimant unable to eat or drink?
- Is the medical condition life-threatening and uncontrollable?
- Will the claimant probably die within 12 months?
- Would the claimant's health be at substantial risk if they were found fit for work or for work-related activity?

Other factors that might be taken into account here include:

- The claimant is pregnant
- There is a risk to others
- Intravenous therapy is being administered
- The claimant has cancer

A 'yes' answer to a non-functional descriptor question will usually lead to the claimant being treated as though they were in the Support Group.

=== Outcomes ===
After the interview and any examination the findings are summarised in free text using Standard English prose and the report, constructed mainly from the LiMA options selected by the assessor during the interview phase of the assessment, is sent electronically to the DWP. The whole report attempts both to record all the findings and to justify the recommendation on fitness for work. It shows the total points score and ends with a statement on whether significant disability is likely or unlikely, and a prognosis. After the assessment, a report from an official at the DWP decides on entitlement to Employment and Support Allowance (or to an enhanced rate of Universal Credit). The process also decides whether a successful claimant is able to take part in 'work-related activity'. In this way, the process sorts claimants into three groups:

- Fit for work
- Unfit for work, but fit for 'work-related activity' (the Work-Related Activity Group)
- Fit for neither work nor 'work-related activity' (the Support Group)

== Results ==
The core WCA generated high volumes of 'fit for work' recommendations from its inception. As the reassessment programme gathered steam, the proportion disregarded by decision-makers grew: 8% of 'fit for work' recommendations were disregarded in 2012; this almost doubled to 15% in 2013 and then increased again in 2014 to 20%.

With initial decisions, almost two-thirds of claimants were declared 'fit for work' by the DWP in 2009 and 2010. This dropped to around half once the reassessment programme got underway in 2011; by 2013, it was a third; by 2014, only a quarter of claimants were declared 'fit for work' by the DWP at the first stage of the decision-making process.

DWP data for the first quarter of 2016 showed that 9% of WCAs carried out at that point in time were reassessments of old Incapacity Benefit claims, while 21% were reassessments of successful ESA claims and the remaining 70% were new assessments of fresh claims. The outcomes, before any reconsiderations or appeals, were:

- After Incapacity Benefit reassessments, 93% of claimants were found to be unfit for work
- After ESA reassessments, 89% of claimants were found to be unfit for work
- After assessments of new claims, 54% of claimants were found to be unfit for work

== History ==
The WCA was introduced in 2008. Prior to this, only a small number of Incapacity Benefit claimants were required to undergo assessment. In its last term of office New Labour began to phase out Incapacity Benefit and replace it with a new benefit: Employment and Support Allowance. The policy objectives for the new test were: to accentuate the positive by "looking at what you can do, not what you can't do"; to take into account new disability legislation, changes in the workplace and developments in occupational health; to make the test more stringent; to assess most new claims in person rather than on paper; and, once the new test had bedded in, to use it to re-evaluate virtually every established sickness benefit recipient. To facilitate these last two objectives testing capacity was increased fivefold by employing nurses and physiotherapists to work alongside doctors, and a semi-structured interview technique based on a computer-generated template was used for the first time.

Initially, only fresh claims for ESA were assessed, but the sickness benefit caseload increased – partly a consequence of the banking crisis and its effect on the economy and on jobs. An overhaul of the test began soon afterwards. The Labour Welfare Secretary at the time, James Purnell, wrote that these and other changes would ensure that "only those who are genuinely incapable of work" would get full ESA. The DWP's in-house medical experts piloted the new criteria in 2010 and parliament gave them legal force in March 2011. Some of these changes would make it easier for some claimants with specific conditions to receive ESA, but most were intended to toughen up the test. The WCA then became the fulcrum for a reassessment of all recipients of Incapacity Benefit and all disabled people on Income Support.

In 2011, after an external review by Professor Malcolm Harrington, Atos designated some of their assessors as 'mental function champions', who would provide mainly telephone advice to other assessors on mental health issues as they related to the WCA's criteria As well as this, in 2011 the DWP began to send decision-makers justifications to the claimants, which explained how the decision was made in plain English.

In 2017, the DWP said that henceforth claimants placed in the Support Group after their WCA who have a "severe, lifelong disability" (as judged by the DWP) would no longer have to undergo periodic reassessment.

== See also ==
- Employment Support Allowance
- Criticism of Employment Support Allowance
