= Income Support =

British social security benefit

Income Support was an income-related benefit in the United Kingdom for some people who were on a low income, but had a reason for not actively seeking work. Claimants of Income Support could be entitled to certain other benefits – for example, Housing Benefit, Council Tax Reduction, Child Benefit, Carer's Allowance, Child Tax Credit and help with health costs. A person with capital over £16,000 could not get Income Support, and savings over £6,000 affected how much Income Support can be received. Claimants had to be between 16 and the age in which eligible for State Pension, work fewer than 16 hours a week, and have a reason why they were not actively seeking work (caring for a child under 5 years old or someone who receives a specified disability benefit).

== Lone parents ==
Claimants could receive income support if they are a lone parent and responsible for a child under five who is a member of their household. A claimant is considered responsible for a child in any week if receiving child benefit for the child. However, if a claimant arranged for their child benefit to be paid to someone else, for example, an ex-partner, the claimant would still be treated as receiving the child benefit.

== Studying ==
If the claimant is at school or in higher education, the claimant may be able to get Income Support if they are:

- Looking after the claimant's own child
- An orphan and nobody is looking after the claimant
- Unlikely to be able to get a job because of a severe disability.
- Not living with the claimant's parents or being supported by them
- Not in touch with the claimant's parents
- Separated from the claimant's parents for reasons that cannot be avoided and nobody is looking after the claimant.

If the claimant is aged 18 to 24 and is attending an unwaged Work Based Learning Programme (England) or Skillseekers (Scotland) course, the claimant may be able to get Income Support.

If the claimant is aged 16 or 17, the claimant may get Income Support only if in one of the categories of persons who can get Income Support whilst studying.

In Scotland, claimants received Income Support for up to 6 months if deemed to be 'estranged' from immediate family.

== Sickness ==
On 27 October 2008, the Employment and Support Allowance replaced Income Support claimed on grounds of sickness or disability. Claims for Income Support made before that date were transferred to ESA.

Prior to this, claimants could be entitled to Income Support if they were unable to work due to sickness and had no or reduced entitlement to Incapacity Benefit. Normally, a claim for both benefits was made and the amount of Incapacity Benefit due was calculated according to the claimant's past National Insurance contributions. If too few contributions had been made for the full rate of Incapacity Benefit to be paid, Income Support may have been paid to top up the amount the claimant received to Income Support rates.

== Parental Leave ==
Customers were able to get Income Support when on unpaid statutory parental leave if, when working, they were getting any of the following.

- Working Tax Credit
- Child Tax Credit
- Housing Benefit

== Amount ==
The weekly personal allowances for 2016/17 are shown in the table below.

Weekly allowance	Amount
Single aged 16–24	£57.90
Single aged 25 or over	£73.10
Lone parent aged 16–17	£57.90
Lone parent aged 18 or over	£73.10
Couple both under 18	£57.90
Couple both under 18 – Higher rate	£87.50
Couple one under 18, other 18–24	£57.90
Couple one under 18, other 25 or over	£73.10
Couple one under 18, one over – Higher rate	£114.85
Both 18 or over	£114.85

Higher rates are set for eligible couples where either one of the couple is responsible for a child, or if each member of a couple is eligible for one of the following benefits if they weren't a couple:

- Employment and Support Allowance
- Income Support
- Jobseeker's Allowance

To this basic amount may be added amounts for qualifying claimants:

- carer premium
- disability premium
- enhanced disability premium
- severe disability premium
- pensioner premium
- family premium (obsolete - no new entitlements)
- family premium lone parent rate (obsolete - no new entitlements)
- disabled child premium (obsolete - no new entitlements)

Existing income from benefits or other sources may be taken into account and deducted from any Income Support entitlement awarded to a claimant.

== Premiums ==
The carer premium applied if a person is entitled to Carer's allowance, even if they were not actually paid it because they received another benefit. This premium is payable for each person who qualifies.

Disability premium was applicable to people getting one of the following qualifying benefits:

- Attendance Allowance
- Disability Living Allowance
- long-term Incapacity Benefit
- Severe Disablement Allowance
- the disability element or severe disability elements of Working Tax Credit
- War pensioner's Mobility Supplement
- Constant Attendance Allowance
- Personal Independence Payment
- Armed Forces Independence Payment

Or if the claimant had been incapable of work or entitled to Statutory sick pay during the qualifying period of 52 weeks (or 28 weeks if terminally ill) and is still incapable of work, or is registered as blind, or taken off that register in the past 28 weeks.

Enhanced disability premium applied if the claimant or partner is in the Employment and Support Allowance support group or is under the qualifying age for Pension Credit and receiving the higher rate care component of Disability Living Allowance, the enhanced rate of the Personal Independence Payment daily living component or Armed Forces Independence Payment.

There are limited circumstances when the pensioner premium would apply. From May 2019 it was only paid when the claimant was above Pension Credit age and their partner had not yet reached that age, but they are unable to claim another benefit (e.g. if the claimant is currently receiving a Severe Disability Premium). Since Pension Credit has features that make it more attractive than Income Support (in particular the way savings are treated) this is unlikely to occur frequently.

Severe disability premium applies if all of the following conditions are met:

- The claimant gets the care component of Disability Living Allowance (middle or higher rate), Attendance Allowance, the daily living component of the Personal Independence Payment or armed forces independence payment
- lives alone (there are exceptions to this rule)
- no one claims Carer's Allowance for looking after them

== Mortgages ==
For home-owners with a mortgage, Income Support may, depending on various qualifying conditions, help pay towards mortgage interest costs. There can be a waiting period of thirteen to thirty-nine weeks.

== Older people ==
Claimants reaching the retirement age, and with an older partner who is that age, may apply for Pension Credit to replace their Income Support payments. They should contact The Pension Service four months before that time.

== Appeal ==
A refusal to grant Income Support may be appealed to the First-tier Tribunal. This should be done working one month of the date of any decision under dispute. If the appellant has good cause, this deadline can be extended a further 12 months (making a total of 13 months from the date of decision).

== See also ==
- Guaranteed minimum income
- Social Fund (UK)
- Supplemental Security Income, a similar programme offered by the United States Social Security Administration
- Welfare state
