= Maximus Inc. =

Healthcare, governmental, and business services provider

- Type: Public
- Traded as: NYSE: MMS; S&P 400 component
- Industry: Healthcare, business services Government contractor
- Founded: 1975
- Headquarters: Tysons, Virginia
- Areas served: Canada, Saudi Arabia, United Arab Emirates, United Kingdom, United States
- Key people: Bruce Caswell (president and chief executive officer); David Mutryn (chief financial officer)
- Revenue: ▲US$5.43 billion (2025)
- Net income: ▲US$319 million (2025)
- Number of employees: 39,600 (2023)
- Website: maximus.com

Maximus Inc. is an American government services company, with operations in countries including the United States, Canada, and the United Kingdom. Maximus provides administration and other services for Medicaid, Medicare, health care reform, welfare-to-work, and student loan servicing, among other government programs. The company is based in Tysons, Virginia, has 39,600 employees and a reported annual revenue of $5.3 billion in fiscal year 2024.

== History ==
Maximus was founded in 1975 by David V. Mastran, initially operating as a consulting firm for the federal government, including information technology services.

The history of Maximus follows the trajectory of significant government policy changes.

The government service reform policies in the '80s and early '90s which were enacted by the Reagan administration and continued in the Bush and Clinton administrations, led to the US government increasing private-sector contracting of administration program functions operated under the control of government. In 1988, Maximus was awarded its first contract for social welfare from Los Angeles County, and began shifting focus towards business process outsourcing and providing state-based consulting services.

Passage of the Personal Responsibility and Work Opportunity Reconciliation Act (PRWORA) of 1996 under President Clinton granting states greater latitude in administering social welfare programs, and the Balanced Budget Act of 1997 amending certain eligibility, enrollment, and beneficiary protections in Medicaid further increased government use of public / private partnerships for the administration of certain program functions.

In 1997, the company went public, trading on the New York Stock Exchange under the symbol MMS.

The G.W. Bush Administration saw reauthorization and expansion of PRWORA, cementing the government's use of private sector contracting of administrative functions associated with Federally funded, state administered, entitlement programs.

In 2006, Richard Montoni, former chief financial officer for Maximus, was named CEO. From 2008 to 2010, Maximus engaged in a number of divestitures that included its Security Solutions, Justice Solutions, Education Systems, Asset Solutions and Enterprise resource planning (ERP) divisions, focusing the firm on providing health and human services core program solutions.

Passage in 2010 of the Patient Protection and Affordable Care Act (ACA) during the Obama Administration further expanded the use of private sector contracting of government administrative functions associated with the ACA, Medicaid, and Medicare, in conjunction with other human services related programs.

From 2010 to 2013, Maximus acquired Denver-based Policy Studies Incorporated (PSI) to increase its capacity to serve government clients in the US and expanded into clinical assessment services with the acquisition of Ascend. From a global perspective, Maximus acquired UK based Health Management Ltd. On April 6, 2015, the company completed the $300 million acquisition of Falls-Church-based technology contractor, Acentia, expanding the Maximus federal technology business.

In 2018, after twelve years as CEO, Richard Montoni announced his retirement and the company appointed President Bruce Caswell to the position of chief executive officer. Caswell articulated a strategic plan focusing the company's activities on helping governments advance digitally-enabled customer service, modernizing technology capabilities and expansion of clinical services delivery. In November 2018, Maximus acquired U.S. Federal citizen engagement center assets from another government contractor (GDIT) for $400 million in cash.

In September 2020, Maximus hired Dr. Arvenita Washington Cherry as Senior Director of DE&I to lead diversity and inclusion activities in its workforce.

In 2021, Maximus completed three additional transactions. Maximus and Navient announced the two companies signed a definitive agreement to transfer the loan servicing for 5.6 million U.S. Department of Education-owned student loan accounts through a contract novation, creating a new operating entity, Aidvantage. Maximus acquired Attain, a technology integration company, and Veterans Evaluation Services (VES), a clinical assessments company. In January 2025, the Department of Veterans Affairs re-awarded VES, a Maximus company, contracts through 2026 for domestic regions 1 – 4 which collectively span the continental U.S. to continue providing medical disability exams services through the Veterans Benefit Administration.

In May 2022, Maximus relocated its headquarters to Tysons, Virginia in new office space that was reported to incorporate "many of the post-pandemic office designs that architects and companies are emphasizing."

In September 2022, after a 3-year long competitive procurement process, the Centers for Medicare & Medicaid Services (CMS) awarded Maximus a 10 year contract that extended its existing role as lead operator of citizen contact centers, including 1-800-MEDICARE. In December 2023, US Department of Health and Human Services Secretary Xavier Becerra announced it would be recompeting this contract for the express purpose of inserting a labor harmony agreement. In November 2024, CMS decided to halt efforts to rebid its contract with Maximus. Some observers, including 17 state attorneys general, noted that there was little precedent for ending an ongoing contract and introducing new labor harmony provisions. Sen. Bill Cassidy, the incoming chairman of the Senate Health, Education, Labor, and Pensions Committee, stated, 'The Maximus contract should never have ended in the first place,' and expressed concerns that the administration's actions were aimed at promoting unionization among call-center employees.

== Structure ==
Maximus’ operations are divided into three segments: U.S. Services, U.S. Federal Services, and outside the U.S.

- U.S. Services: business process services (BPS), appeals and assessments, and consulting work for U.S. state and local governments. This work has included supporting programs associated with Medicaid, the Affordable Care Act, Medicare, the Children's Health Insurance Program (CHIP), the Supplemental Nutrition Assistance Program (SNAP), Refugee Support Services, and Temporary Assistance for Needy Families (TANF)
- U.S. Federal Services: end-to-end solutions, appeals and assessments, system and application development, IT modernization, and maintenance services
- Outside the U.S.: business process services (BPS) for international governments and commercial clients. This includes health and disability assessments, program administration for employment services, wellbeing solutions, and other services related to work-support programs.

== Services ==
Maximus is one of the largest providers of government services. The company provides business process management, technology integration and implementation, and consulting services in policy and program areas that include Health and Wellness, Welfare and Safety Net, Citizen Services, and Federal/National Agencies.

=== Health and Wellness ===
Maximus provides services for government health programs including Medicaid and workers' compensation independent medical review, the Children's Health Insurance Program (CHIP), Medicare and health insurance exchanges as required under the Affordable Care Act. Maximus serves on the Enroll America advisory council.

In September 2012, the Illinois Department of Healthcare and Family Services awarded Maximus Health Services a two-year, $76.8 million contract to help the state with its Medicaid program. That same month, Maximus announced a $23.5 million contract with the State of Oklahoma to operate a customer relationship management system for SoonerCare, the state's Medicaid program, and Insure Oklahoma, a program that provides employers with subsidies to help buy private market health insurance for their low- to moderate-income employees.

Maximus is also the largest provider of privatized health insurance appeals to Medicare. In 2012 it expanded its growing Federal operations, bringing 500 local jobs to upstate New York and Pennsylvania, including more than 325 jobs in Pittsford, NY and more than 125 jobs to Scranton, PA.

The company offers services in the health insurance exchange marketplace and in July 2012, the Minnesota Department of Commerce awarded Maximus a two-year, $41 million contract to create the state's new health insurance exchange. In February 2013, Connecticut awarded Maximus a $15 million contract to run the customer contact center operations for the state's health insurance exchange, Access Health CT.

=== COVID-19 Response ===
In March 2020, Maximus began working with government agencies in the United States at the federal, state, and local level to assist with the COVID-19 pandemic response. This work initially included providing testing results and conducting contact tracing, in states such as Arizona and Indiana. In September 2020, Maximus announced the creation of Maximus Public Health to establish citizen engagement centers and support “efforts to contain the spread of COVID-19 and toward the purchasing and distribution of vaccines."

In 2021, Maximus shifted its focus to vaccine distribution. The company worked directly with states, like Colorado, to provide information to residents and schedule vaccine appointments. In May 2021, the Center for Disease Control (CDC) announced it had selected Maximus to “support a national hotline program" for vaccine distribution.

=== Welfare and Safety Net ===
National governments, state agencies, and local governments administer and deliver programs that address complex social challenges like poverty and health equity. Maximus supports agencies in this area, offering services such as welfare-to-work programs, including Ticket to Work, as well as support for the Supplemental Nutrition Assistance Program (SNAP), Temporary Assistance for Needy Families (TANF), and Refugee Support Services.

In 2012, the company launched its first welfare-to-work program in Canada and expanded its Australia operations with a five-year contract to help people with disabilities find employment.

Maximus also provides child support enforcement and other child support services. In 2009, the company won a five-year contract to collect and enforce child-support collections in Shelby County, Tennessee. Maximus launched Project NOW (Negotiating Outstanding Warrants), an initiative that collected more than $35,000 to help nearly 100 parents in Shelby County get back on track after missing child support payments.

Maximus provides support for the UK’s Department of Work and Pensions. In 2011, Maximus was recognized as the top performing provider for welfare-to-work services under the United Kingdom's Flexible New Deal programme, helping job seekers into long-term sustained employment. Following the Flexible New Deal, the United Kingdom government unveiled a replacement program, called the Work Programme, that created welfare reform changes. Maximus serves as a contractor in three regions under the UK's Work Programme initiative. Its subsidiary, Centre for Health and Disability Assessments Ltd., runs Work Capability Assessments with a contract which began in 2014 and runs until July 2021.

In 2012, the company launched its first welfare-to-work program in Canada and expanded its Australia operations with a five-year contract to help people with disabilities find employment.

Maximus provides support for the U.S. Department of Education’s student debt management and collection system and student loan counseling for the Federal Student Loan program. Maximus Federal Services is a contractor to FSA for DMS (Default Management System) one of the systems used to process student loan defaults.

=== Citizen services ===
Governments offer a variety of other services – passports and drivers licensing, disaster and recovery administration, travel assessments, census administration, etc. – for citizens. Maximus’s services in this area have included support for:

- The Federal Emergency Management Agency (FEMA)
- The 2020 Census

=== Federal/National Agencies ===
Maximus supports federal/national agencies in the design, implementation, and management of business processes and enabling technologies to achieve specific programmatic missions. This includes support for the Defense Information Systems Agency, Energy Department and the Securities and Exchange Commission (SEC). Maximus also contracts with the Internal Revenue Service (IRS) to modernize the agency's technology infrastructure and provides NextGen Business Process Operations Support Services for the Department of Education.

== Awards and recognitions ==
Gartner selected Maximus as the winner of its 2011 Business Process Management (BPM) Program of the Year. The same year, Gartner recognized Maximus for business performance management.

In 2015, Maximus was recognized as one of the Top Companies to work in the Washington, D.C. area by the Washington Post. In 2017, Fortune Magazine named Maximus to its annual World's Most Admired Companies list. Military Times honored Maximus as a Top Employer for veterans in 2020.

In 2022, Maximus was recognized for the second year in a row and ranked #3 in the United States Enterprise segment by Hired.

In 2023, Maximus was ranked 13th nationally by Forbes on its list of America's Best Employers for Diversity and was recognized as a company with The Best Diversity And Inclusion Initiatives To Apply To After Graduation. Also in 2023, Maximus was rated for the third consecutive year as having one of the 100 best corporate internship programs in the United States by WayUp & Yello and was recognized as a top employer for Gen Z careers in the Handshake 2023 Early Talent Awards.

In 2023, Maximus received two Platinum Hermes Creative Awards. One award recognized the company's work on the Pennsylvania Independent Enrollment Broker (PA IEB) project, which focused on improving Medicaid services. The second award was for the Maricopa County Job Seeker Initiative, which utilized social media to enhance employment support services.

In 2024, Maximus was named one of The Washington Post’s Top Workplaces in the Greater Washington region. Maximus was recognized as a VETS Indexes 5 Star Employer in the 2024 VETS Indexes Employer Awards, for the third consecutive year. Additionally, Maximus was recognized as a Top Veteran Employer by Military.com in 2024.

Maximus was awarded the 2024 Disability Matters North America Award for successful outreach, recruitment, engagement and retention of candidates, employees and customers with disabilities.

Maximus was featured in TIME Magazine’s list of America’s Best Mid-Size Companies for 2024 and was also included in Fortune Magazine’s Fortune 1000, which ranks companies by revenue.

Additionally, Washington Technology ranked Maximus among the top 20 federal contractors in 2024.

== Sponsorships and charity ==
=== Corporate giving ===
In 2010, Maximus and other Northern Virginia companies digitized mislabeled and unaccounted-for graves, on a pro bono basis, and upgraded a paper record-keeping system for Arlington National Cemetery.

In 2011, Maximus helped fund No Kid Hungry Texas, to reduce childhood hunger through existing nutrition plans.

Maximus provided financial support to the National Hispanic Health Foundation (NHHF) scholarship program for health services students and to the Urban League of Middle Tennessee in 2012.

=== The Maximus Foundation ===
The Maximus Foundation is a non-profit 501(c)(3) charitable organization incorporated in the Commonwealth of Virginia. Funding is provided by charitable gifts from Maximus employees and supplemented by grants from the company. The foundation contributes to programs helping disadvantaged individuals achieve self-sufficiency, particularly programs serving children. The Chairman of the Foundation is president and General Manager of Maximus Federal Services, John Boyer.

In 2009, the Maternity and Early Childhood Foundation used a grant from the Maximus Foundation to upgrade aging computer equipment and build its capacity to promote quality services and provide required reports to New York State. In 2011, EMQ FamiliesFirst, a California-based non-profit agency that helps children in crisis and their families, received a grant from the Maximus Foundation. In 2012, the South Bronx Overall Economic Development Corporation (SoBRO) used grant money from the Maximus Foundation to start the Greenhouse Roof Operation (GRO), a program to teach disadvantaged youth vocational skills through the construction and operation of a hydroponic farm. That same year, the Maximus Foundation awarded over $100,000 in grants for Washington D.C non-profit organizations benefitting children.

In 2013, the Maximus Foundation contributed $29,000 to Nepal Earthquake Relief through Project HOPE and in 2015, provided back-to-school supplies to 2,000 low-income children in Austin, Texas, such as socks and a brand-new backpack with school supplies.

In 2015, the Foundation announced that it distributed approximately $390,000 in grants to 121 nonprofit organizations in 22 states. Grantees included CASA of Los Angeles and the Community Health Centers of Burlington.

The Maximus Foundation helped fund the work of four high school students at Thomas Jefferson High School for Science and Technology in Alexandria, Virginia, to develop Atheia, a new technology to assist those with vision problems.

== Controversies ==
November 1997: The Hartford Courant reported that Maximus "gets minimal results" when it was hired by the State of Connecticut to manage a child care program for recipients of welfare. According to the Record-Journal, Maximus "hired too few people, installed an inadequate phone system and fell weeks or months behind in making payments to day care providers." The Connecticut Department of Social Services (DSS) asked Maximus to meet improvement goals and by December, DSS Commissioner Joyce A. Thomas noted improvements on several fronts commenting, "The good news for Connecticut's child care providers and the families we all serve is that the situation is rapidly improving. Maximus has come a long way, and we are confident that current efforts are paving the way to long-term improvements."

December 1998: The Sarasota Herald Tribune reported that the State of Florida had paid Maximus $4.5 Million for a Child Support Recovery contract. Maximus was only able to collect $162,000. "On average taxpayers paid Maximus $25 for every 3 cents collected."

1999: Then-mayor of New York, Rudy Giuliani held his first meetings in May 1999 introducing the city's welfare reform programs which would require adult welfare recipients to either work or train for work. Mid-June was set as the deadline for the competition for the contracts. However, the Giuliani administration began to consult with Maximus executives on how the company could "reshape, consolidate and run" the programs, as early as January 1999. Starting in January, Maximus was awarded contracts worth $500 million, which represented the "largest share" to assess and train as many as 200,000 welfare recipients and to provide job placement. New York city's comptroller said that this gave Maximus an "unfair advantage".

October 2000: Six state lawmakers in Wisconsin called for the termination of Maximus' W-2 contract, saying the firm has "broken faith with the state and poor people the agency serves in Milwaukee County."

June 2001; The Milwaukee Journal Sentinel reported that two Maximus employees filed discrimination complaints against the company. The employees stated that Maximus is so lacking in diversity that the companies minority employees referred to it as "White Castle".

2004: In 2004, British Columbia became the first province in Canada to outsource a large quantity of its health administration services—which included Medical Services Plan and PharmaCare—to the private sector, when BC Health signed the ten-year $324-million contract with Maximus. A campaign was launched in the province to protect private and personal health information. Concerns included the risk of disclosure of confidential date accessed under the Homeland Security Act.

July 2007: Maximus settled a lawsuit brought against it by the United States government for involvement in falsifying Medicaid claims for $30.5 million. Maximus did not admit or deny the government's allegations in the legal case.

October 2010: The Los Angeles Times reported that 146 medical workers, including doctors, nurses and pharmacists were allowed to keep working despite failing drug tests. Maximus was awarded a $2.5 Million a year contract to run California's confidential "diversion programs". Maximus contracted the work out to a subcontractor who in turn subcontracted the work to another company. The drug testing company was using the wrong standard of drug test from December 2009 to August 2010, resulting in medical workers who tested positive for drugs to continue working.

June 2011: A Maximus manager on the MassHealth project and had access to the personal information of enrollees in the MassHealth program, who had passed the Massachusetts-required CORI background check, was revealed to have pleaded no contest to a Florida felony by Boston-based Fox25. A subsequent review by Maximus found “no reason to believe that anyone’s personal information was used inappropriately” and terminated the employee.

September 2011: Maximus Inc. was sued by U.S. Equal Employment Opportunity Commission (EEOC) for disability discrimination for failure to promote a female employee because it regarded her as disabled. Maximus settled the lawsuit in August 2012.

June 2012: Through an internal privacy audit, Maximus discovered that a worker in Canada illegally viewed personal health records of 43 Canadians. The worker involved was immediately suspended and later fired.

January 2013: A Maximus employee based in Boston MA was indicted for allegedly stealing more than $490,000 from the Massachusetts Medicaid program. The theft had occurred over a period of nine years. She was convicted in December 2013.

February 2013: In his February 2013 report, the British Columbia auditor general said that Maximus 10-year contract with BC Health lacked adequate monitoring and had not brought the "expected benefits" it had promised. Major deadlines were not met and no penalties were laid. Desktop and laptops were not replaced as often as agreed upon. Even after almost a decade, privacy issues had not been dealt with adequately. BC Health relies solely on the company to self-report breaches. Subcontractors were not given security audits. As well, auditing does not “provide assurance that data access and storage are limited to Canada and that the data can be segregated from the service provider’s parent companies.”

April 2021: An investigation by NPR and The Marshall Project found that many U.S. states were involved in the following practice, using Maximus as enabler and facilitator:

"Social Security pays benefits to children who have significant disabilities, when their parents are disabled, or if a parent has died. When the check goes to a minor, someone is designated as the representative payee, trusted to use that money in the best interest of the child. States routinely take that money to cover the cost of foster care, even though there are already state and federal sources to pay for it and even though other impoverished children and youth who don't get Social Security checks aren't responsible for paying for their foster care."

Maximus was found to be among the consulting companies that were hired by states—including Alaska, California, Florida, Illinois, Iowa, Nebraska, New York, Maryland, and South Carolina—to locate foster children eligible to receive disability and other checks from Social Security and register them, for the sole purpose of generating revenue for the states. Even after these foster children aged out of the foster care program, they were not able to get the Social Security funds to which they were entitled. Law professor Daniel L. Hatcher criticized the practice in his book The Poverty Industry.

March 2022: A report by the Student Borrower Protection Center and the Communications Workers of America noted consumer complaints filed against Aidvantage in relation to federal student loans, and accused Maximus, its parent company, of mismanagement.

In 2022 and 2023, Maximus workers were involved in actions to demonstrate against labor conditions and for improved pay, following employee layoffs.
