= Incapacity Benefit =

Welfare benefit in the United Kingdom

Incapacity Benefit was a British social security benefit that was paid to people facing extra barriers to work because of their long-term illness or their disability. It replaced Invalidity Benefit in 1995. The government began to phase out Incapacity Benefit in 2008 by making it unavailable to new claimants, and later moved almost all the remaining long-term recipients onto Employment and Support Allowance.

== History ==
=== 1995 ===
In 1995, the Conservative Secretary of State for Social Security, Peter Lilley, abolished Invalidity Benefit for fresh claims and replaced it with Incapacity Benefit after the Prime Minister of the day, John Major, had complained about the burgeoning caseload, saying: "Frankly, it beggars belief that so many more people have suddenly become invalids, especially at a time when the health of the population has improved".

A new feature of Incapacity Benefit was that officials could ask for claimants' disabilities to be confirmed using a bespoke testing procedure – the All Work Test – carried out by doctors working for the government. Another feature was that claimants would be assessed on their ability to do any job, not just their old trade. And unlike its predecessor, Incapacity Benefit was taxable. Nevertheless, the caseload continued to rise.

After 2000, some recipients underwent a Personal Capability Assessment to establish whether their condition had improved: if it had, benefit payments could be withdrawn; otherwise, a Capability Report was drawn up by the examining doctor and used by Job Centre staff to plan ways to boost recipients' employability, in the hope of returning them to work. This new test was also used to assess some fresh claims for Incapacity Benefit.

=== 2008 ===
In late 2008, Gordon Brown’s Labour government replaced Incapacity Benefit with Employment and Support Allowance (ESA) for new claims and brought in another gateway health test largely carried out by nurses: the Work Capability Assessment.

Following the introduction of ESA, the number of remaining Incapacity Benefit recipients dwindled, largely as they came off the benefit upon reaching the State Pension age. By early 2011, the Incapacity Benefit caseload had shrunk by more than 500000, and the ESA caseload had grown by the same amount.

=== 2011 to 2016 ===
David Cameron and Nick Clegg’s coalition government decided to implement the plan to reassess most remaining Incapacity Benefit recipients. This reassessment programme, which began in early 2011 and was effectively completed in 2016, used an updated version of the Work Capability Assessment. Recipients confirmed as having limited capability for work were transferred onto ESA; any found fully capable of work had their Incapacity Benefit payments stopped and were invited to apply for Jobseekers Allowance (JSA).

== Eligibility ==
To be eligible for Incapacity Benefit claimants had to meet one of two criteria:

- Have paid National Insurance contributions in the past
- Be over 16 but under 20 and were unable to work because of illness or disability that began before they turned 20 (or under 25 if the claimant had been in education or vocational training for at least three months immediately before they reached the age of 20) and been unable to work for at least 28 weeks.

For the first 28 weeks of the claim, eligibility was based on whether the claimant could do their normal occupation. From the 29th week onwards, eligibility was based on whether the claimant was able to do any type of work. People over state pension age who were claiming Incapacity Benefit before they reached this age were eligible to receive Incapacity Benefit for up to one year after they became eligible for the state pension.

== Payment ==
Weekly Rates for Incapacity Benefit (2018-2019)
	Short Term(under state pension age)	Short Term(over state pension age)	Long Term
Lower Rate	£82.65	£105.15	£109.60
Higher Rate	£97.85	£109.60	£109.60

The short term rate was paid to people who had claimed Incapacity Benefit for less than 52 weeks. After 52 weeks, claimants would be paid the long term rate, however, claimants who had a terminal illness or got the highest rate care component of Disability Living Allowance were able to be paid the long term rate after 28 weeks of claiming Incapacity Benefit. The short term rate was split into two other categories: lower rate and higher rate. The lower rate was paid to people who had been sick or disabled for more than four days but less than 28 weeks and who were not able to claim Statutory Sick Pay. The higher rate was paid to people who had been sick or disabled for more than 28 weeks but less than 52 weeks. Claimants who became unable to work as a result of sickness or disability before the age of 45 also were paid the Incapacity Age Addition.

== Criticisms ==
=== High number of claimants ===
The number of Incapacity Benefits rose dramatically in the 1990s. A study on this phenomenon argued that it was extremely unlikely that the number of people with serious disabilities had risen as rapidly as the number of Incapacity Benefit claimants. The study found that areas where a high number of jobs had been lost (for example, from the closure of coal mines in the 1980s) experienced the biggest rises in people claiming Incapacity Benefit, but that there was no comparable rise in Jobseeker's Allowance claimants.

In 2004, the caseload peaked at just under 2,500,000 then began to fall slowly, but caseloads never fell lower than they were in 1995.

=== Use to conceal unemployment levels ===
A report written by academics from Sheffield Hallam University argued that Incapacity Benefit had been used to give the appearance that unemployment levels were lower than they genuinely were. The report's author's claimed that because Incapacity Benefit claimants were not counted as unemployed in official data on employment levels, unemployed people with disabilities that did not necessarily prevent them from working were allowed to claim Incapacity Benefit so that unemployment figures would appear lower. The report cites data from the DWP that show that the number of Incapacity Benefit in relation to the number of JSA claimants rose considerably between the 1990s and the 2000s. As well as this, an article in the Telegraph argued that the number of former Incapacity Benefit claimants found fit for work when assessed for ESA showed that Incapacity Benefit had been used to hide unemployment levels

=== Lax eligibility testing ===
In 2008, the then health secretary, Alan Johnson complained about a "sick-note culture" that allowed people to drift onto Incapacity Benefit. In some cases, the claimant's recorded main disabling conditions were conditions that were not necessarily disabling, such as acne or a chronic cough. A medical certificate from a GP is the first step onto sickness benefits; although a government-run eligibility test was brought in alongside Incapacity Benefit in 1995, said that officials still accepted too many claims using information supplied by the claimants themselves and their GPs without asking for an All Work Test to be performed, partly because the pool of medical assessors was relatively small and partly because doctors' time was costly - which was why large numbers of nurses were brought in to perform the new test introduced in 2008.

=== Welfare trap ===
In 2014, Iain Duncan Smith said that once claimants had been granted Incapacity Benefit they were caught in a welfare trap, where it was not worth coming off the benefit and going to work.

=== High cost ===
In 2011, out-of-work sickness benefits had an annual cost of £13 billion: the Chancellor, George Osborne, called this "a very large budget". The total annual budget of the Department for Work and Pensions in the 2011/2012 financial year was £166.98 billion, with the largest slice by far - almost half - being spent on the State Pension, followed by Housing Benefit at slightly under £30 billion. Tax Credits, administered by the Treasury, cost roughly the same as Housing Benefit.

=== Number of people found fit for work during ESA re-assessment programme ===
After many Incapacity Benefit claimants were reassessed, some news reported that only a very small number of Incapacity Benefit claimants were genuinely unable to work. The Guardian claimed that 75% of Incapacity Benefit claimants who were reassessed for ESA were fit to work. This figure that had been arrived at by combining the number of claimants who withdrew their claim during the assessment phase, those who were found fit for work after the WCA and those who were placed in the work-related activity group. 25% of Incapacity Benefit claimants who attended a WCA were found fit for work.
