= Welfare Reform Act 2012 =

Act of the Parliament of the United Kingdom

Welfare Reform Act 2012 (Note: Section 151.)
- Act of Parliament
- Parliament of the United Kingdom
- Long title: An Act to make provision for universal credit and personal independence payment; to make other provision about social security and tax credits; to make provision about the functions of the registration service, child support maintenance and the use of jobcentres; to establish the Social Mobility and Child Poverty Commission and otherwise amend the Child Poverty Act 2010; and for connected purposes.
- Citation: 2012 c. 5
- Introduced by: Iain Duncan Smith (Commons); Lord Freud (Lords)
- Territorial extent: England and Wales; Scotland (in part); Northern Ireland (in part); (Note: Section 149.)

Dates
- Royal assent: 8 March 2012
- Commencement: Various (Note: Section 150.)
Other legislation
Amends	Registration Service Act 1953; House of Commons Disqualification Act 1975; Northern Ireland Assembly Disqualification Act 1975; Ministers of the Crown Act 1975; Limitation Act 1980; Vaccine Damage Payments Act 1979; Social Security Contributions and Benefits Act 1992; Social Security Administration Act 1992; Social Security (Consequential Provisions) Act 1992; Social Security Administration (Northern Ireland) Act 1992; Value Added Tax Act 1994; Jobseekers Act 1995; Education Act 1996; Scotland Act 1998; Immigration and Asylum Act 1999; Capital Allowances Act 2001; Public Audit (Wales) Act 2004; Work and Families Act 2006; National Health Service (Consequential Provisions) Act 2006; Tribunals, Courts and Enforcement Act 2007; Child Maintenance and Other Payments Act 2008
Amended by	Pensions Act 2014; Sentencing Act 2020; Dissolution and Calling of Parliament Act 2022; Universal Credit (Removal of Two Child Limit) Act 2026

Status: Amended

Text of statute as originally enacted

Revised text of statute as amended

The Welfare Reform Act 2012 (c. 5) is an act of the Parliament of the United Kingdom which makes changes to the rules concerning a number of benefits offered within the British social security system. It was enacted by the Parliament of the United Kingdom on 8 March 2012.

Among the provisions of the act are changes to housing benefit which came into force on 1 April 2013. These changes include an "under-occupancy penalty" which reduces the amount of benefit paid to claimants in social housing if they are deemed to have too much living space in the property they are renting. (This already applied to tenants in private rental accommodation). Although the Act does not introduce any new direct taxes, this penalty has been characterised by the Labour Party and some in the media as the "Bedroom Tax", attempting to link it with the public debate about the "Poll Tax" in the 1990s. Advocating the Act, the Chancellor of the Exchequer (George Osborne) stated that the changes would reduce welfare dependency and support working families.

== Provisions ==
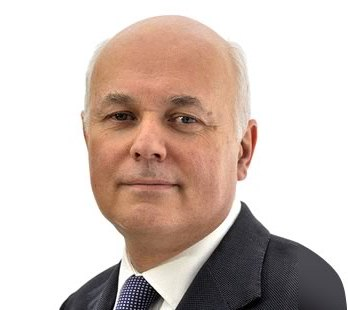
Iain Duncan Smith, sponsor of the Welfare Reform Act 2012

The main elements of the legislation are:

- the introduction of Universal Credit
- stronger penalties for fraud and error
- new "claimant commitment"
- phasing out of Disability Living Allowance and replacement with Personal Independence Payment
- reform of Housing Benefit, including introduction of under-occupancy penalty, referred to by its opponents as a "bedroom tax".
- changes to the Social Fund, including greater power to local authorities
- reform of Employment and Support Allowance
- changes to child support

=== Universal Credit ===
The Welfare Reform Act introduces a new welfare benefit called Universal Credit which is to replace six of the main means-tested benefits and tax credits:

- income-based Jobseeker's Allowance (from the Jobseekers Act 1995)
- income-related Employment and Support Allowance (Part 1 of the Welfare Reform Act 2007)
- Income Support under section 124 of the Social Security Contributions and Benefits Act 1992
- Housing Benefit (section 130 of the 1992 Act)
- Council Tax Benefit (section 131 of the 1992 Act)
- Child Tax Credit and Working Tax Credit (Tax Credits Act 2002)

The benefit is to operate as a single payment to claimants and will be available to working people on a low income and the unemployed. Its stated aim is to improve the incentive to work by making it easier for people who have temporary, low-paid work to move in and out of employment without losing benefits, and to simplify the benefits system by bringing together several benefits into a single payment. Through this scheme, it is envisaged that unemployed people will be encouraged to take on more work for any period of time that is available. The system has some similarities to a negative income tax but it is not the same as a basic income guarantee as payments are conditional on availability and means-tested.

Universal Credit was launched in selected areas of North-West England with a UK-wide rollout in 2013.

=== Council Tax Support ===
As of April 2013, Council Tax Benefit is replaced with a new system of Council Tax Reduction schemes. Prior to this change, councils (local authorities) provided Council Tax Benefit to certain individuals who were otherwise unable to pay meet the cost of Council Tax, due to unemployment or certain other circumstances, using nationally set rules; the funding for this was provided by central government.

Under the reformed system, councils are required to design their own local Council Tax Reduction schemes, under which council tax bills will be reduced for certain categories of people, instead of paying out a virtual benefit to cover the cost of a standard bill. Schemes must be based on a claimant's income, or their status as the only adult in the property, and old-age pensioners must continue to receive at least the same reduction to their net council tax bill as they would have done under the Council Tax Benefit system. Frequently, councils have marketed these schemes as council tax support, and continue to portray them as a payment rather than as a reduction in tax owed.

The cost of providing Council Tax Benefit was covered by a central government grant to councils, and on the introduction of the replacement tax reduction schemes, central government continued to supply a grant contributing towards the cost of the schemes. However, the grant was reduced by 10%; requiring councils to limit reductions under the scheme, make cuts elsewhere, or increase council tax. Although many councils have opted for schemes that keep reductions to the minimum allowed under law (87%) for people on low income, others have implemented schemes that continue to provide 100% discounts, while others are means tested in a more granular manner.

Existing exemptions for council tax continue to apply.

=== Housing Benefit ===
Under the Act, Housing Benefit criteria now take into consideration the number of rooms and number of people occupying a property and restrict payments to allow for one bedroom per person or per couple; all children under 10 years of age are expected to share a room; children under 16 of the same gender expected to share. This had already been the case, for over a decade, for people living in private sector tenancies (and hence is a key part of calculating Local Housing Allowance), but is new to tenants of social housing. If it is deemed that there are too many rooms in a rented dwelling for the number of occupants, an "under-occupancy penalty" is applied to the housing benefit payment, reducing it by 14% for one extra room, and by 25% for two or more extra bedrooms.

Since their landlord continues to charge the same rent, affected tenants must make up the shortfall. Housing benefit was historically paid directly to landlords of social housing, so that the tenant was essentially uninvolved in the rent payment; having to make up a shortfall, under the new arrangements, has therefore often been perceived as a tax. This perception has been used for propagandistic purposes by opponents of the government, who have referred to the under-occupancy penalty as the "Bedroom Tax"; conversely (and in response) the government prefers to call the previous arrangements a "spare room subsidy". A number of exemptions apply to the rule:; carers of disabled tenants who need to stay overnight are permitted to have one extra bedroom.

The care system, historically operated by local councils, has been augmented to include discretionary housing payments to cover the cost of the under-occupancy penalty (and the equivalent effect in private sector tenancies), where a need for an extra bedroom arises from disability, or for other reasons at the discretion of the council.

Housing Benefit is to be phased out, and equivalent housing payments under similar rules will form a component of Universal Credit payments, and Pension Credit payments.

=== Benefit Cap ===
The Act limits the total amount of money available to social security claimants. As of 2013 – the year that the cap was first introduced – total benefits paid to a single person could not exceed £350 per week; the maximum available to families (single parents and couples with children) was £500 per week. The benefits limited by this cap include:

- Housing benefit
- Income Support (IS), Jobseeker's allowance (JSA) and Employment and Support Allowance (ESA)
- Child benefit and Child tax credits
- Guardian's allowance
- Carer's allowance
- DWP maternity benefits and widows benefits
- Severe Disablement Allowance.

Council Tax support and free school meals do not count towards the benefit cap. Families in receipt of working tax credits are exempt from the cap, as are pensioners and claimants of certain other disability benefits (including Personal Independence Payment and Attendance Allowance).

The benefit cap did not initially apply in Northern Ireland (as implementation of the Act was subject to partisan negotiations within the Stormont Assembly, which impinged on the viability of that assembly). It was introduced gradually into the rest of the UK; at first, from 15 April 2013 it only applied in the London boroughs of Bromley, Croydon, Enfield and Haringey, but reached the whole of Great Britain by the end of September 2013.

A study published in November 2014 by New Policy Institute and Trust for London found there to be 46,000 households affected by the introduction of the overall benefit cap in April 2013, of which 46% have been in London. When the cap was brought in, London had a disproportionately high amount of social housing, while also having disproportionately high housing prices.

=== Personal Independence Payment ===
Benefits available to people with disabilities are changed by the Act. The Personal Independence Payment (PIP) is to replace Disability Living Allowance gradually, first with an initial pilot in selected areas of north west and north east England which began in April 2013, with a full roll-out across Great Britain by October 2015. Claimants are required to undergo assessments to prove their eligibility for the benefit. The tests must be passed three months prior to claiming and claimants must be able to satisfy the requirements of the test for a period of at least nine months after their claim. Payments are varied according to the severity of disability as decided by the tests and relate to ability to carry out daily living activities and level mobility. Claimants are also required to undergo periodic re-assessments to ensure ongoing eligibility for the benefit; depending on the type of disability, a person may be given a short award of up to two years or longer PIP award which would last for up to five or ten years. PIP is not available to children under sixteen and PIP claimants must apply before they turn sixty five years old as new PIP claims cannot be made after that age. Responsibility for the tests has been outsourced by the DWP to two private companies, Atos Healthcare in the north of England, London, southern England and Scotland, and Capita Business Services Ltd in central England, Wales and Northern Ireland.

== Context ==
The Act was introduced by the Government of David Cameron as part of the programme of austerity with the aim of reducing the amount of welfare spending in the United Kingdom. In 2011–12, the Department for Work and Pensions reported a welfare expenditure of over £159 billion, approximately 22.8% of total government spending. The government heading of Welfare Expenditure covers payments made by the Department for Work and Pensions only, and does not include the cost of the tax credit system (covering in-work benefits) or child benefit, which are both paid by HMRC, making the total amount significantly larger.

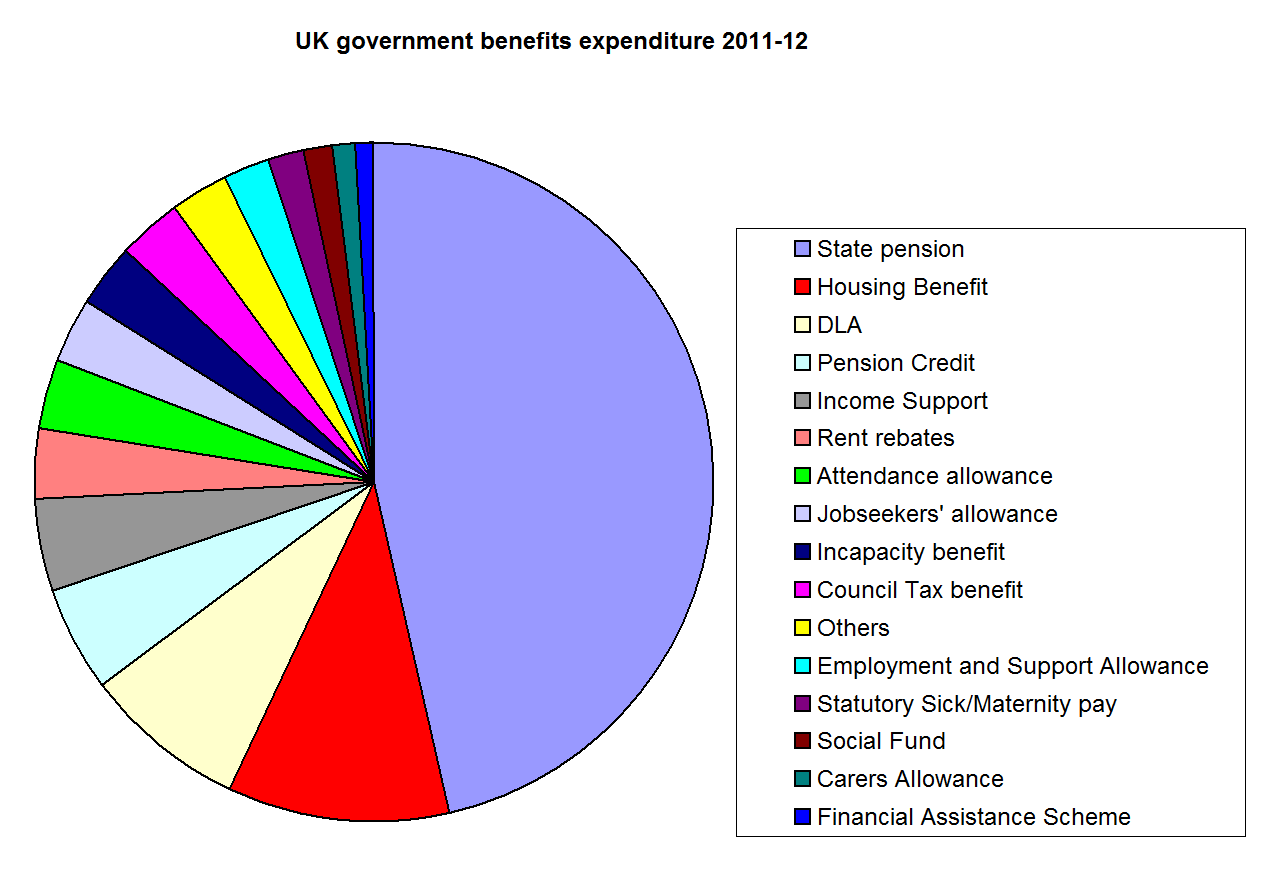
Pie chart of government expenditure on benefits in the United Kingdom, 2011-12

UK Government welfare expenditure 2011–12
Benefit	Expenditure (£bn)
State pension	£74.2
Housing Benefit	£16.9
Disability Living Allowance	£12.6
Pension Credit	£8.1
Income Support	£6.9
Rent rebates	£5.5
Attendance Allowance	£5.3
Jobseeker's allowance	£4.9
Incapacity Benefit	£4.9
Council Tax Benefit	£4.8
Others	£4.7
Employment and Support Allowance	£3.6
Statutory Sick/Maternity pay	£2.5
Social Fund	£2.4
Carer's allowance	£1.7
Financial Assistance Scheme	£1.2
TOTAL	£160.2

== Reaction and analysis ==
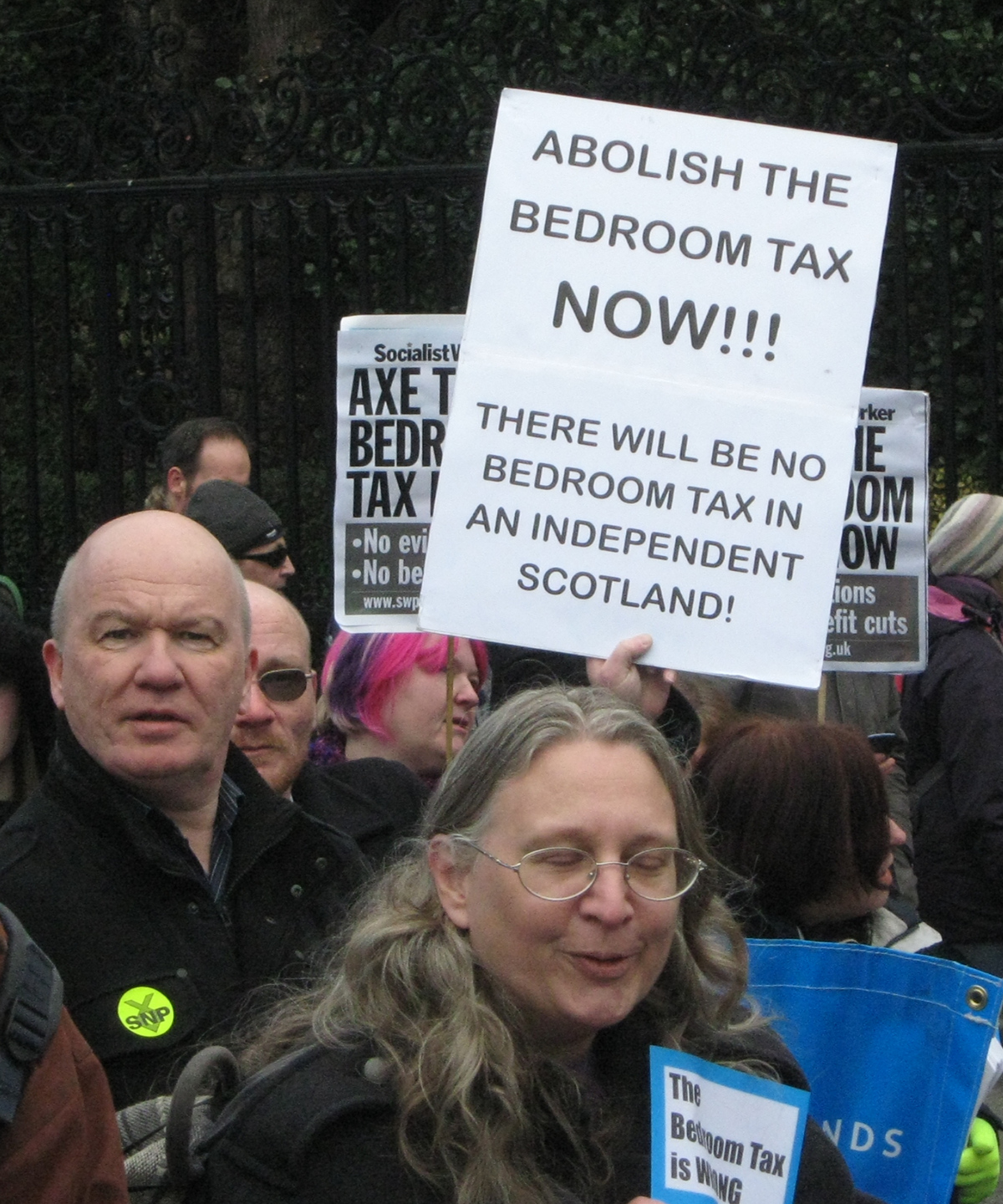
Protesters in Edinburgh demonstrate against the "Bedroom Tax", March 2013

Elements of the Welfare Reform Act 2012 have been subjected to critical scrutiny in the UK Parliament and in the media. Debate about the changes to Housing Benefit has mostly focussed on the under-occupancy penalty. Detractors have widely referred to the penalty as a "bedroom tax", while government advocates of the scheme have used the term "spare room subsidy". In Prime minister's questions on 27 February 2013, Prime Minister David Cameron remarked that the under-occupancy penalty was not a form of taxation as it did not involve deducting money from personal earnings. He also cited figures that indicated a 50% increase in national housing benefit spending over a ten-year period, and asserted that the new policy would encourage reallocation of accommodation and thereby reduce overcrowding and council housing waiting lists.

Some media commentators have expressed opinions that the benefit rules may lead to a UK-wide housing crisis.

Critics of the new benefit rules have commented on situations where tenants who are affected by the under-occupancy penalty will be forced to move to smaller properties to avoid losing money, and have drawn attention to a shortage of housing. According to the Scottish Labour Party, an estimated 78,000 tenants across Scotland will be expected to move into one-bedroom accommodation while only 20,000 single-occupancy social housing properties are available. In some smaller communities where no single-bedroom dwellings are available, it has been claimed that tenants may be forced to move to a different town; Scottish broadcaster STV reported on the case of a Coatbridge woman who may have to leave the town which has been her home for fifty one years. According to the then-leader of the Labour Party Ed Miliband, an estimated 5000 people in Kingston upon Hull are to be affected by penalties, but only seventy three council properties are available in the city.

In an interview on BBC Radio 4's Today Programme on 1 April 2013, the sponsor of the bill Iain Duncan Smith defended the welfare changes with the argument that the new benefits system would encourage people to be in work and reduce overcrowding whilst reducing benefit costs. His statement in the interview that it was possible to live on £53 per week attracted considerable media attention; he made the claim in response to a complaint by a member of the public in a telephone interview, who stated that he was supplementing his low income as a market trader with state benefits and claimed that, after benefit cuts, he would have to live on £53 per week. The accuracy of the caller's account was later called into question in the media.

The UK disability rights organisation Scope was critical of the changes and, while it expressed support in principle for assessing claimants more carefully, took the view that the assessment criteria were flawed, would cause undue hardship to disabled people and were too strongly focused on cutting welfare budgets. Work capability assessments carried out by the private contractor Atos Healthcare were subjected to critical scrutiny in Parliament following a number of controversial decisions in which disabled individuals were denied benefits and required to look for work. In a few cases, the individuals concerned were reportedly driven to suicide by their experience.

On 21 February 2014 five disabled tenants of social housing lost a Court of Appeal case against the benefit reforms. The group claimed that the effects of the welfare reforms did not take into account the accommodation needs of disabled people and that it was in breach of the European Convention on Human Rights. The Court of Appeal decided they could not intervene in the benefit changes.

In June 2014, a Trust for London-funded report by Child Poverty Action Group found there to be sixteen London boroughs that have more households claiming housing benefit than there are affordable properties, with families relying heavily on short term discretionary housing payments from councils to stay in their homes. The report concluded that London councils are struggling to find local housing for local families as a result of reform.

In July 2014, a report was published by the DWP that said only one in twenty claimants affected by the change had downsized their property. In response to this, the Liberal Democrats signalled a change in their support for the policy, with both Nick Clegg and Danny Alexander stating that they would like to see changes to the way it is implemented.

A report published in January 2015 by the London School of Economics and Political Science, partly funded by Trust for London, presented modelling to suggest changes to direct taxes, tax credits and benefits from May 2010 to 2014/15 were together fiscally neutral, rather than contributing to deficit reduction.

== Protests ==
=== Scotland ===
In Scotland, there were two major demonstrations on 30 March 2013 against the changes to welfare:

- Around 3,000 demonstrators took to the streets of Glasgow
- Around 1,000 demonstrators assembled outside of the Scottish Parliament in Edinburgh

Participants in the protests include the Scottish Socialist Party and the Radical Independence Campaign. There were Yes Scotland and Scottish Green Party banners present at both events. Some parliamentarians from the Scottish National Party and the Scottish Labour Party issued statements of support.

=== North West England ===
On Monday, 22 July 2013, a man in Runcorn benefits advice office cut his own throat in protest of the bedroom tax. The injuries were not fatal.
