= Bedroom tax =

United Kingdom welfare policy

The bedroom tax is a United Kingdom welfare policy whereby tenants living in public housing (also called council or social housing) with rooms deemed "spare" experience a reduction in Housing Benefit, resulting in them being obliged to fund this reduction from their incomes, move home, or face rent arrears and potential eviction by their landlord (be that the local authority or a housing association). The policy was introduced as part of the Welfare Reform Act 2012 passed during the Premiership of David Cameron. Bedroom tax is the most commonly used term for the policy, especially by critics of the changes who argue that they amount to a tax because of the lack of social housing (or in some areas, any rented accommodation) for affected tenants to downsize to (and the refusal to accept the risk of taking in lodgers). The bedroom tax is also referred to as the under-occupancy penalty, under occupation penalty, under-occupancy charge, under-occupation charge or size criteria.

In 2016 it was announced that the penalty would be extended to pensioners. Caroline Abrahams of Age UK said: "Imposing the cap on older tenants will not only cause them anxiety and distress, it is also pointless given the lack of affordable housing options available to them". It has not been applied to pensioners.

Supporters of the changes have referred to the unreformed system as a "spare room subsidy" whereby tax-payers are said to have been subsidising social-housing tenants living in houses larger than they needed. The stated intention of the under-occupancy penalty policy was to reduce these costs and to ease housing shortages and overcrowding.

A similar policy was enacted by the preceding New Labour government during the decade beforehand in private-sector housing, as the Local Housing Allowance, without attracting controversy. The 2012 legislation essentially represented an equalisation of treatment of benefit claimants, regardless of whether they live in private tenancies or social housing. The reforms formed one part of the 2010–2015 Coalition Government's wide-ranging welfare-reform agenda – sometimes known as the United Kingdom government austerity programme – which included the introduction of Universal Credit, the introduction of a welfare cap to limit the total size of the welfare bill, reform of the Council Tax and the introduction of Personal Independence Payments to reform of disability benefits.

== Policy ==
The under-occupancy rules apply, from 1 April 2013, to all those of working age. The policy applies to working-age social housing tenants who receive housing benefit and are deemed to have more bedrooms than they need. If a tenant has one spare bedroom, their housing benefit is reduced by 14% of the eligible rent, and if they have two or more spare bedrooms, it is reduced by 25%. The stated aim of the policy was to encourage social housing tenants to downsize to smaller properties, freeing up larger homes for families who need them.

Critics argue that the policy has had a disproportionate impact on disabled people and other vulnerable groups, as well as increasing poverty and homelessness. Supporters of the policy argue that it is a fair way to manage social housing and encourage efficient use of housing resources.

The rules for calculating allowed bedrooms are the same as for Local Housing Allowance introduced by the Labour government in 2008 for benefit claimants in private sector tenancies, except for the rules involving disability or the armed forces.

One bedroom is allowed for each of the following:

- An adult couple
- Each other person aged 16 and over
- Two children of the same sex under 16
- Two children who are under 10 regardless of sex
- Any other child (other than a foster child whose main home is elsewhere)
- A non-resident carer (or group of carers) for a person in the house requiring overnight care
- Where a room is required by a disabled child who is unable to share a bedroom

=== Exemptions ===
A number of types of housing are exempt from the changes. These include those living in temporary accommodation, shared ownership accommodation and non-standard accommodation such as houseboats and mobile homes.

There is a further category of exempt accommodation defined as "accommodation provided by a housing association, a registered charity or voluntary association where that body, or a person acting on its behalf, also provides the claimant with care or support" (supported housing), "or supervision" (sheltered housing). The UK Supreme Court ruled in 2019 that failing to provide a bedroom for the partner of a severely disabled tenant was a breach of that partner's human rights to a home. A room is needed in that tenancy for the disabled partner's medical equipment.

If a "spare" bedroom is created following a death then a council tenant's housing benefit will not be reduced until a year after the death.

The Welfare Supplementary Payments (Amendment) Bill provides protection to around 37,000 households in Northern Ireland.

== Rationale ==
The official rationale of the policy is to encourage council tenants of homes that are supposedly too large for their needs to move to smaller homes so that the existing housing stock can be better used. A second rationale adopted by the Department for Work and Pensions is to reduce the overall housing benefit bill.

In 2012, speaking in the House of Lords, Lord Freud stated:

I remind noble Lords of the core argumentation. We do not think that taxpayers should be expected to meet the cost of somewhere approaching 1 million spare bedrooms, a cost of around £0.5 billion every year. Clearly this is unfair, or certainly different, to those in the private rented sector who receive benefits based on their household need.

== Public opinion ==
In a November 2013, opinion poll carried out by Ipsos Mori found that more of the public supported than opposed the reduction of housing benefit for under-occupying social housing tenants. The policy was most popular among owner occupiers and least popular among social renters. In July 2014, a YouGov poll found that 49% of people opposed "the bedroom tax" and 41% supported it.

== Positions of political parties ==
=== Conservatives ===
The Conservative Party has tended to refer to the under-occupancy penalty as the removal of a "spare room subsidy" (implicitly taking into consideration the entire housing benefit paid out for the tenancy, rather than the net payment made by the tenant). Writing in The Telegraph Conservative Minister Iain Duncan Smith has argued:

We need to put an end to the unfair situation where the taxpayer is subsidising people to have homes, paid for by the state, with spare rooms they do not need. This is effectively a spare room subsidy. Britain cannot afford it and nor can the taxpayer.

=== Liberal Democrats ===
As members of the Coalition government, the Liberal Democrats leadership supported the Welfare Reform Act 2012. However, of the party's 57 MPs, 38 voted in favour, 18 abstained and one, Manchester Withington MP John Leech, who was the first MP to speak out against the bill, voted against. At their 2013 Spring Conference, members voted to review the policy that looks at the "money saved, costs incurred and the effect on vulnerable tenants". In March 2014 Inside Housing reported that the Liberal Democrats plan to end the "bedroom tax" for all except those who refuse a suitable and reasonable offer of accommodation. This represents a change in position as the party voted against a similar amendment to the 2012 Welfare Reform Act. Liberal Democrat Tim Farron (at that time President of the party) has also criticised the distorting effect that the under occupancy changes have on the market. Following their change in policy, the Liberal Democrats voted with Labour on 5 September 2014, for Lib Dem MP Andrew George's private members bill to restrict the number of cases in which the penalty could be levied.

In their 2017 general election manifesto, the Liberal Democrats declared their intention to end the bedroom tax.

=== Scottish National Party ===
In their 2015 general election manifesto the Scottish National Party stated that: "We will vote for the immediate abolition of the unfair bedroom tax".

=== Labour ===
The Labour Party pledged to repeal the act had they been elected in 2015.

=== Other parties ===
The under-occupancy penalty is opposed by the Trade Unionist and Socialist Coalition, the UK Independence Party, the British National Party, the Green Party of England & Wales, Plaid Cymru, the Democratic Unionist Party, the Social Democratic & Labour Party (SDLP), the Alliance Party of Northern Ireland, the Ulster Unionist Party and Sinn Féin.

== Reaction ==
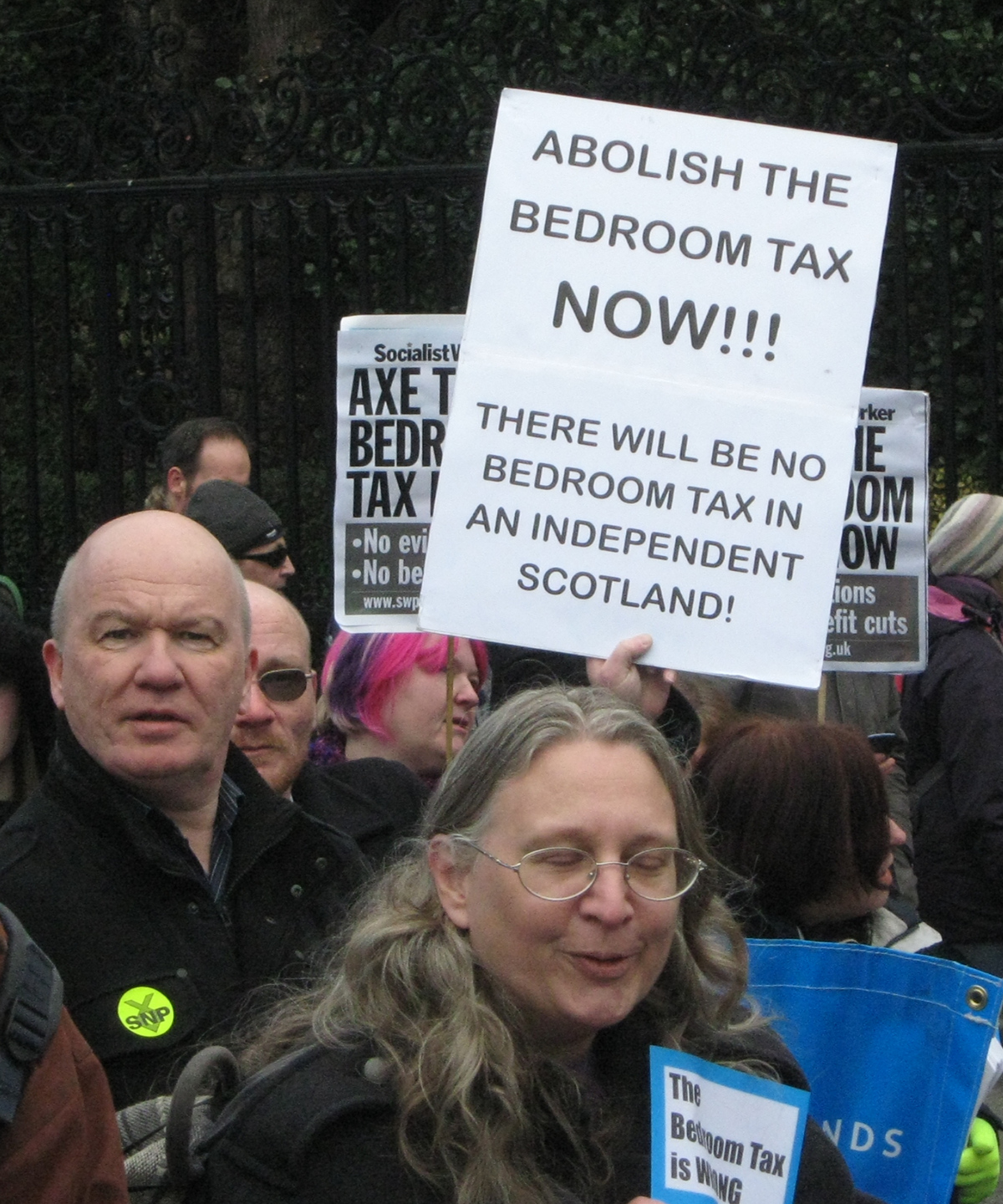
Protesters opposing the under occupancy penalty outside the Scottish Parliament. The term "bedroom tax" is used by critics to describe the changes to social housing occupancy rules.

In August 2013, The Independent newspaper released figures which (it argued) showed that 96% of the people who would be affected by the changes would be unable to move anywhere else due to the lack of available social housing. Although it is illegal to sub-let a social tenancy, it is legal for social tenants in this situation to take in lodgers, to cover the extra cost. This is encouraged by the government; potentially, this provides the tenant with a net profit, and reduces the total number of people seeking alternative accommodation.

The under-occupancy penalty has been criticised for potentially costing more than it saves by forcing individuals into the private rented sector, where rents are higher, thereby increasing the cost to the taxpayer. The National Housing Federation has estimated that the housing benefit bill could increase by £143 million if affected tenants were to downsize by moving into smaller privately rented accommodation. However the Government argues that freeing up social housing would also reduce the cost of housing people in expensive temporary accommodation; since those people would be more likely to find themselves in overcrowded accommodation as compared to those affected by the penalty, the combined impact should be to reduce net costs, and reduce net overcrowding.

=== Impact of death ===
Michael Rosen writing in The Guardian has criticised how, under government proposals, parents living in social housing could become liable for what he calls the bedroom tax after only three months following the death of a child, something that inadvertently causes the creation of a "spare" room. In March 2015, The Daily Mirror reported that a woman had become liable for the bedroom tax after her son's death from a brain haemorrhage following an assault.

=== Effect on disabled people ===
The changes in housing benefit have been criticised for having a disproportionate effect on disabled families. Two-thirds of individuals affected by the under-occupancy penalty are disabled. Historically, most care and support for disabled individuals was provided by local councils, and their predecessors, rather than central government; in consequence there is an expectation from the government that costs arising out of care needs, including extra bedroom space, should be met by local council budgets. However, over the 20th century, central government took over the cost of providing benefits that cover housing costs; therefore, the government provided a new annual grant to councils, so that they can make discretionary housing payments for disabled people in this situation. The government has recently merged this grant into the general funding provided to councils.

== Legal challenges ==
In July 2012, the High Court rejected the premise that the policy was a breach of Article 14 of the European Convention on Human Rights due to the effect on disabled people.

In January 2015, it was announced that the Supreme Court of the United Kingdom would rule in March 2016 on whether the "bedroom tax" was illegal on the basis that it unfairly discriminated against disabled adults.

In May 2015, a father successfully challenged the penalty at a tribunal. The father had separated from his partner but was able to argue that his "spare" room was occupied by his son who stayed with him three nights a week. However, it was believed that the Government would challenge the ruling.

In February 2016, a decision by the Upper Tribunal involving Stevenage Borough Council considered the question of what constituted a room for the purposes of the regulations. Judge Lloyd-Davies decided that a room "should be capable of accommodating a single adult bed, a bedside table and somewhere to store clothes, as well as providing space for dressing and undressing". This implies a minimum size of 65.81 square feet for a rectangular room.

On 13 November 2019, according to the Guardian, the Supreme Court ruled that "applying a 14% housing benefit reduction to a man, referred [sic] only as RR, was a breach of his right to home under the Human Rights Act. RR’s partner is severely disabled so 'it is accepted' that the couple need an extra bedroom for her medical equipment, Lady Hale said".

In 2019, the European Court of Human Rights ruled the bedroom tax discriminatory and incompatible with Article 14 in conjunction with Article 1 Protocol 1 of the European Convention on Human Rights.

=== Case law ===
- Lall v Westminster City Council
- SSWP v David Nelson and Fife Council
- Rutherford v Secretary of State for Work and Pensions
- Bolton Metropolitan Borough Council v BF (HB)
- RR v Secretary of State for Work and Pensions (2019)

== Effect ==
In 2015, Channel 4 reported that the Bedroom Tax lowered the quality of houses and created "ghost towns" in the North of England. A 2018 study found the bedroom tax "was not successful in encouraging residential moves", but "it did incentivise people who moved to downsize – suggesting some success in terms of one of the policy goals, namely reducing under-occupancy. The policy did not incentivise people to work more and we find no statistically significant effects on households' food consumption or saving behaviour".

The Centre for Housing Policy at the University of York concluded that the under-occupation policy has saved money, but that the potential savings forecast by the Department for Work and Pensions have been overestimated. The use of Discretionary Housing Payment has partly reduced the savings predicted for the penalty.

In July 2014, a report was published by the DWP that said only one in twenty claimants affected by the change had downsized their property. A study published four months earlier had similar results.

The report also showed that there has been great demand for downsizing properties but there has been nowhere near sufficient supply of suitable sized housing.

In response to this report, the Liberal Democrats signalled a change in their support for the policy, with both Nick Clegg and Danny Alexander stating that they would like to see changes to the way it is implemented.

== See also ==
- Welfare state in the United Kingdom
