= Benefit cap =

UK welfare policy

The benefit cap was a UK welfare policy which limited the amount in state benefits that an individual household could claim per year. It was introduced by the Cameron–Clegg coalition government in 2013 as part of the coalition government's wide-reaching welfare reform agenda which included the introduction of Universal Credit and reforms of housing benefit and disability benefits. The government cited wide public support for the measure, despite it being highly controversial. The benefit cap primarily affects families with children, high rents, or both. By 2024, two-thirds of the families affected by the cap were single-parent families, half of which had a child under five.

A two-child policy restricting child tax credit and universal credit was introduced in 2017. It limited these benefits to the first two children in most households, and was therefore referred to as the "two-child benefit cap". These two benefit caps formed part of a set of three benefits policies designed by the then Chancellor of the Exchequer, George Osborne, as part of the United Kingdom government austerity programme. The third policy, introduced in 2013, was known as the bedroom tax.

== History ==
The benefit cap was announced in the October 2010 Spending Review by the coalition government and was made law by the Welfare Reform Act 2012, The Benefit Cap (Housing Benefit) Regulations 2012 and The Universal Credit Regulations 2013. It began roll out in April 2013 and was fully implemented by September 2013. By 2014 a total of 36,471 households were having their payments reduced by the benefit cap, of which 17,102 were in London. When it was introduced in 2013 it was set at a level of £26,000 per year (£500 per week) which was the average family income in the UK. For single people with no children it was set at £18,200 per year (£350 per week).

The level of the benefit cap was subsequently lowered following an announcement in the July 2015 United Kingdom budget. From Autumn 2016 it was reduced to £20,000 (£13,400 for single adults without children), except in London where it was reduced to £23,000 (£15,410 for single adults without children). This change increased the number of households capped to 60,000. As the level of the cap did not increase over time the number of households affected by it rose, reaching 112,000 in 2022.

In April 2023 the benefit cap was increased for the first time since its introduction. The limits were raised by 10.1%, the same percentage as for inflation-linked social security benefits for that year. In the 2023 autumn statement presented by HM Treasury it was announced that, although inflation-linked social security benefits would rise by 6.7% in 2024, the benefit cap would not be raised in that year.

== Abolition ==
Chancellor Rachel Reeves announced in the November 2025 United Kingdom budget that the two child benefit cap would be scrapped in April 2026. The Universal Credit (Removal of Two Child Limit) Act 2026 was given royal assent on 18 March 2026, and came into effect on April 6. The change in policy was warmly welcomed in anti-poverty and social justice circles.

== Policy ==
=== Cap on household benefits ===
According to Iain Duncan Smith who was Secretary of State for Work and Pensions at the time of its introduction, the principle behind the household benefit cap was that "people who are on benefits should not be earning more than those, for example, on average earnings".

Affected benefits:

- Bereavement Allowance
- Child Benefit
- Child Tax Credit
- Employment and Support Allowance
- Housing Benefit
- Incapacity Benefit
- Income Support
- Jobseeker's Allowance
- Maternity Allowance
- Severe Disablement Allowance
- Widowed Parent's Allowance
- Universal Credit

=== Amounts ===
The following were the total benefits that individual households are limited to.

==== From April 2013 ====
	Annual	Weekly
Main rate	£26,000	£500
Single person rate	£18,200	£350

==== From November 2016 ====
London	Annual	Weekly
Main rate	£23,000	£442.31
Single person rate	£15,410	£296.35

Outside London	Annual	Weekly
Main rate	£20,000	£384.62
Single person rate	£13,400	£257.69

==== From April 2023 ====
London	Annual	Weekly
Main rate	£25,323	£486.98
Single person rate	£16,967	£326.29

Outside London	Annual	Weekly
Main rate	£22,020	£423.46
Single person rate	£14,753	£283.71

=== Exemptions ===
The initial regulations provided an exemption from the benefit cap for those who received Disability Living Allowance. Those who work enough hours to claim working tax credits are not subject to the benefit cap.

=== Northern Ireland ===
The benefit cap in Northern Ireland is set at the "Outside London" rates, and families with children can apply for Supplementary Payments to reduce its impact.

== Positions of political parties ==
=== Conservatives ===
The Conservative Party supported the benefit cap which was announced by George Osborne at the 2010 Conservative Party conference.

=== Labour ===
In 2012 the Labour Party expressed support for a regional cap on benefits rather than a national one without expressing a view on where the cap should be set and without stating whether the cap should be higher in London, where rents are highest. In 2015 the Labour Party leader Harriet Harman ordered Labour MPs to abstain during the House of Commons vote on the Welfare Reform and Work Act 2016, which reduced the benefit cap. Forty-eight of them rebelled and voted against the bill, including the future Shadow Chancellor John McDonnell.

The party remained divided on the issue, and in 2023 the party leader, Keir Starmer, ruled out scrapping the two-child limit. Following their victory in the 2024 UK general election, the Labour Party said that it would not scrap the two-child limit until fiscal conditions allow. The Resolution Foundation has said that abolishing the two-child limit would cost the government between £2.5 billion and £3.6 billion during the financial year 2024–25, and the charity Save the Children has estimated that doing so would take half a million children out of relative poverty. Scottish Labour have continued to demand that the two-child benefit cap be scrapped.

=== Liberal Democrats ===
The Liberal Democrats supported the introduction of the benefit cap but a notable rebel was Sarah Teather MP, a former Minister for Children and Families in the coalition government, who described the policy as "immoral and divisive" and voted against it in the House of Commons. The Liberal Democrats in their 2024 general election campaigning said they would abolish the two-child benefit cap if elected to government.

=== Green Party ===
The Green Party has said that it would abolish the two-child benefit cap.

=== Scottish National Party ===
In Scotland, the governing Scottish National Party announced in December 2024 that it intended to work with the UK government to abolish the two-child benefit cap in Scotland in 2026.

=== Reform UK ===
In 2025, Reform UK leader Nigel Farage supported lifting the two-child benefit cap, stating that "for lower paid workers this actually makes having children just a little bit easier for them".

In January 2026, Farage expressed concern that lifting the cap would "benefit huge numbers of foreign-born people".

In February 2026, Robert Jenrick stated that if Reform UK were to take power, they would reintroduce the two-child benefit cap.

== Public opinion ==
Opinion polling at the time of the benefit cap's introduction showed strong support for the policy. A poll carried out in July 2013 showed that 73% supported the policy and only 12% opposed the policy.

== Impact ==
Concern was expressed that the 2016 reduction in the cap would seriously increase poverty and homelessness among affected families and would affect over 300,000 children. Research by the Chartered Institute of Housing (CIH) indicated that the number of families affected would be higher than the government expected and warned that continuing the policy would make Theresa May’s promise of a "society fairer for families" harder to achieve. Terrie Alafat of the CIH feared that many families could face poverty following a redundancy or ill health. She said: “This could have a severe impact on these families, make housing in large sections of the country unaffordable and risk worsening what is already a growing homelessness problem”. Imran Hussain of the Child Poverty Action Group said: “A lower benefit cap is crueller and more damaging for children". Once the reduction had come into force, fears were expressed that children's life chances would be affected.

When the benefit cap was introduced in 2013, the coalition government predicted that it would reduce public expenditure by £225 million by April 2015. Half of those affected by the benefit cap between 2013 and 2016 lived in London where rents are 61% higher than the national average. Research by the housing charity Shelter in 2015 indicated that the reduction of the benefit cap in 2016 could affect at least 100,000 households, primarily in Southern England, and the charity expressed concerns that those affected might be subjected to homelessness and poverty. In 2017, the UK Council for Psychotherapy said that benefit cuts and sanctions were "having a toxic impact on mental health". Rates of severe anxiety and depression among unemployed people increased from 10.1% in June 2013 to 15.2% in March 2017. In the general population, the increase was from 3.4% to 4.1%.

Statistics published by the Department for Work and Pensions (DWP) indicated that by 2018, 70% of the households that had been subject to the cap were no longer subject to it, amounting to 54,000 households. In that year independent research was published examining 10,000 benefit-capped households. It estimated that the policy had increased the likelihood of moving into work by 21%. However, only 37% of those no longer subject to the cap had become so due to a higher income. For every child affected by the cap whose parents had moved back into work, eight others were living in worse financial circumstances. Over half of those households subject to the cap remained so for six months or more, and two-thirds of those experienced a shortfall between their monthly income and estimated costs. Overall the average gap between rent and housing benefit for families affected by the cap was £3,750 a year. A study of council tenants in England affected by the cap indicated that they were two-thirds more likely to be in rent arrears than other tenants claiming housing benefits, and that 28% of all households affected by the cap were receiving a discretionary housing payment.

Analysis of DWP figures published in November 2018 carried out by the Labour Party indicated that single women with one or more dependent children made up over 85% of the householders who had their benefits capped (114,337 of the total 134,044). Overall 120,297 single claimant women had their benefits capped, compared with 13,743 single claimant men.

A study published in 2023, which was funded by the Nuffield Foundation and carried out by the University of York, indicted that the benefit cap, in conjunction with the country's two-child policy, had contributed to rising levels of child poverty in the 2010s. A 2024 study by the London School of Economics found that the benefit cap typically traps people in poor quality privately rented housing, increasing their levels of poverty, and that it fails to persuade them to gain employment or move to cheaper housing as they usually already live in the cheapest homes in the local area. In consequence, the study says, they often have to use everyday living expenses to cover rental costs, leaving them without adequate clothing and reliant on food banks.

== Legal challenges ==
The benefit cap has been the subject of a number of legal challenges.

=== 2015 ===
The first attempt at a test case of the benefit cap was made in 2013 during the policy's pilot in four London boroughs. Permission was given for a judicial review of the policy on behalf of a number of families, two of the claims involving victims of domestic abuse. Papers submitted to the court suggested that these two families would have to choose between "risking losing their homes, or returning to their abusers in order to escape the imposition of the cap." In November 2013 the High Court dismissed the claim for the judicial review.

In 2015 the Supreme Court issued judgement on the case, R (on the application of SG and others) v Secretary of State for Work and Pensions, concerning an argument made on behalf of the two lone mothers that the benefit cap was discriminatory and unfair. The court ruled by a 3–2 majority verdict that the benefit cap was lawful but three of the five judges concluded that the benefit cap breached the United Nations Convention on the Rights of the Child, to which the UK is a signatory. Supreme Court judge Lord Carnwath recommended that the government review the policy. Deputy president of the court, Lady Hale, said that: "claimants affected by the cap will, by definition, not receive the sums of money which the state deems necessary for them adequately to house, feed, clothe and warm themselves and their children." In reaction to the judgment the work and pensions secretary, Iain Duncan Smith, said: "I am delighted that the country’s highest court has agreed with this government and overwhelming public opinion that the benefit cap is right and fair".

Also in 2015, the benefit cap was the subject of a successful legal challenge on the grounds that it unlawfully discriminated against disabled people and their carers. In 2016 Lord Freud announced the government's intention to exempt those in receipt of Carer's Allowance from the benefit cap, in response to the High Court ruling.

=== 2019 ===
The Supreme Court rejected a subsequent legal challenge made by lone parents who argued that the benefit cap discriminated generally against women, who make up most of the population of single parents, and specifically against lone parents with young children. The court held by a majority of 5–2 that the discriminatory effects are justified.

== Reaction ==
=== Critical ===
Writing about the benefit cap in 2013, George Eaton argued in the New Statesman magazine that "the cap is less a serious act of policy than a political weapon designed to trap Labour on the wrong side of the argument". Eaton cited a YouGov poll published earlier that year, which found that 79% of people, including 71% of Labour voters, supported the benefit cap, while 12% opposed it. In the same year The Guardian newspaper argued that, because the benefit cap applied regardless of family size, larger families were likely to be disproportionately affected. And also in 2013, The Children's Society estimated that 140,000 children (1.04% of children in the UK) and 60,000 adults would be affected by the measure.

=== Positive ===
Some critics argued that the initial level at which the benefit cap was set was too high. Conservative MPs David Ruffley and Brooks Newmark argued for the benefit cap to be set at £20,000.

== See also ==
- Poverty in the United Kingdom
- United Kingdom government austerity programme
