= DHP =

DHP may refer to:

- D.H. Peligro, the drummer for American punk band Dead Kennedys
- Damascus–Hama and Extensions (Damas-Hamah et Prolongements), a former Lebanese railway line
  - Sika Club Beirut, also known as D.H.P., a former association football club in Lebanon
- Dark Horse Presents, a former anthology comic-book by Dark Horse Comics
- Dane Haylett-Petty, an Australian Rugby Union player
- David Hyde Pierce, an American actor, best known for his role on Frasier
- Defense Health Program, the enterprise within the United States Department of Defense that provides health care
- German-Hanoverian Party (Deutsch-Hannoversche Partei), a defunct political party of Germany
- Revolutionary People's Party (disambiguation), political parties in Turkey
- Dhammapada, a versified Buddhist scripture
- Diffie–Hellman problem, a problem in cryptography
- Dihydropyran, a chemical used in organic synthesis
- Dihydropyridine, a chemical used in pharmacology
- Discretionary Housing Payment, a discretionary housing-cost benefit in the UK
- Dunman High Programme, an Integrated Programme offered in Dunman High School, Singapore
- Ca_{v}1.1, calcium channel, a voltage-dependent, L type, alpha 1S subunit
- Damascus–Hama Railway (French: Chemin de fer Damas–Hamah et Prolongements), a Franco-Ottoman railway in Syria
