= Rutherford v Secretary of State for Work and Pensions =

UK legal case

Rutherford v Secretary of State for Work and Pensions, (C1/2014/2539 & C1/2015/0502) was a case taken before the Supreme Court of the United Kingdom. The case concerns the application of the "bedroom tax" to a family who care for their disabled grandson who has Potocki–Shaffer syndrome.

== See also ==
- Discretionary Housing Payment
