= Welfare cap =

Limit on UK government welfare spending

The welfare cap is a self-imposed limit on the amount that the government of the United Kingdom can spend on certain social security benefits and tax credits. The welfare cap was first introduced in the 2014 United Kingdom budget. The policy took effect in 2015, and the limit for the financial year 2015–2016 was set at £119.5 billion, amounting to 56% of total welfare spending.

The operation of welfare cap is set out in The Charter for Budget Responsibility. The Office for Budget Responsibility (OBR) is required to report periodically on whether the cap has been met or exceeded. The OBR initially made its assessments annually in the Autumn, but since 2017 the cap is only assessed at the first Budget of a new Parliament. Welfare spending was initially required to be less than the cap every year, but since 2017 this has been replaced by a medium-term welfare cap and welfare spending is assessed for a single year chosen by HM Treasury. Following the 2017 general election the OBR made its Autumn 2017 assessment for the financial year 2021–22. The 2019 general election led to a subsequent assessment at the March 2020 budget for the financial year 2024–25 with the cap set at £135.4 billion for that year.

In January 2022 the House of Commons approved a change to the welfare cap allowing it to qualify as one of the "fiscally neutral classification changes" which do not require approval from Parliament.

The policy was a facet of the Coalition government's wide-reaching welfare reform agenda which included the introduction of Universal Credit and reforms of housing benefit and disability benefits.

== Implementation ==
In accordance with the 2014 Budget the welfare cap was set at £119.5 billion in 2015/16 and increased to £126.7 billion in 2018/19. However, Housing Benefit and Jobseeker's Allowance are not included in the overall cap on welfare spending. In June 2014, leaked internal documents suggested that the Coalition government could breach its own welfare spending cap. This breach was confirmed in the 2015 Spending Review.

The OBR judged that the welfare cap was being breached in its 2015 and 2016 assessments, requiring a Government minister to justify the excess spending to the House of Commons on both occasions. In 2016 the National Audit Office said that the Welfare Cap was "encouraging a greater understanding of spending on some benefits and tax credits across government", but commented that the government's decision to exclude Jobseeker’s Allowance could create an "incentive for government to keep claimants on Jobseeker’s Allowance instead of encouraging claimants into work and increasing entitlement to in-work benefits".

Forecasts for 2017–18 and 2018–19 both indicated significant expenditure on social security outside the cap.

== Positions of political parties ==
The welfare cap was supported by nearly all Members of Parliament, passing by 520–22. During the vote on the 2014 United Kingdom budget that introduced the welfare cap, the policy was supported by the Labour shadow cabinet but thirteen Labour MPs opposed it, including future party Leader Jeremy Corbyn, future Deputy Leader Tom Watson, future Shadow Chancellor John McDonnell and future Shadow Home Secretary Diane Abbott.

== Criticism ==
In 2014 Chris Goulden of the Joseph Rowntree Foundation criticised the way in which the welfare cap was more likely to include benefits claimed by the poorest in society:

"there is more spending that is not in the welfare cap (albeit virtually all state pension) than is within the cap. Overall, 30% of spending from within the welfare cap is on the richest half of society but 40% of the protected spend".

Also in 2014 Faiza Shaheen of the New Economics Foundation think-tank argued that the welfare cap appeared to be the result of ideology rather than an aim to tackle the underlying causes of welfare dependency.

== See also ==
- Poverty in the United Kingdom
- United Kingdom government austerity programme
