= Welfare Reform Act =

Stock short title used for legislation

Welfare Reform Act is a stock short title used for legislation in the United Kingdom relating to social security benefits.

The Bill for an Act with this short title may have been known as a Welfare Reform Bill during its passage through Parliament.

== List ==
=== United Kingdom ===
- The Welfare Reform and Pensions Act 1999 (c. 30)
- The Welfare Reform Act 2007 (c. 5)
- The Welfare Reform Act 2009 (c. 24)
- The Welfare Reform Act 2012 (c. 5)
- The Northern Ireland (Welfare Reform) Act 2015 (c. 34)
- The Welfare Reform and Work Act 2016 (c. 7)

Northern Ireland

- The Welfare Reform Act (Northern Ireland) 2007 (c. 2 (N.I.))
- The Welfare Reform Act (Northern Ireland) 2010 (c. 13 (N.I.))

Scotland

- The Welfare Reform (Further Provision) (Scotland) Act 2012 (asp 10)

=== United States ===
The Personal Responsibility and Work Opportunity Act is sometimes referred to as the Welfare Reform Act of 1996

== See also ==
List of short titles
