= List of statutory rules of Northern Ireland, 2008 =

This is an incomplete list of statutory rules of Northern Ireland in 2008.

== 1-100 ==
- Moneymore Road, Cookstown (Abandonment) Order (Northern Ireland) 2008 (S.R. 2008 No. 1)
- Energy Order 2003 (Supply of Information) Regulations (Northern Ireland) 2008 (S.R. 2008 No. 3)
- Roshure Road, Desertmartin (Abandonment) Order (Northern Ireland) 2008 (S.R. 2008 No. 12)
- Airports (Designation) (Power to Detain and Sell Aircraft) Order (Northern Ireland) 2008 (S.R. 2008 No. 13)
- M2/A26 (Ballee Road East link) Order (Northern Ireland) 2008 (S.R. 2008 No. 14)
- New NAV List (Time of Valuation) Order (Northern Ireland) 2008 (S.R. 2008 No. 15)
- Jobseeker’s Allowance (Joint Claims) (Amendment) Regulations (Northern Ireland) 2008 (S.R. 2008 No. 16)
- Planning (Environmental Impact Assessment) (Amendment) Regulations (Northern Ireland) 2008 (S.R. 2008 No. 17)
- Waste Management (Miscellaneous Provisions) Regulations (Northern Ireland) 2008 (S.R. 2008 No. 18)
- Disability Discrimination (Private Hire Vehicles) (Carrying of Guide Dogs etc.) Regulations (Northern Ireland) 2008 (S.R. 2008 No. 19)
- Deposits in the Sea (Exemptions) (Amendment) Order (Northern Ireland) 2008 (S.R. 2008 No. 20)
- Health and Safety (Fees) Regulations (Northern Ireland) 2008 (S.R. 2008 No. 21)
- Rules of the Supreme Court (Northern Ireland) (Amendment) 2008 (S.R. 2008 No. 22)
- Criminal Appeal (Offenders Assisting Investigations and Prosecutions) Rules (Northern Ireland) 2008 (S.R. 2008 No. 23)
- Family Proceedings (Amendment) Rules (Northern Ireland) 2008 (S.R. 2008 No. 24)
- Pig Production Development (Levy) Revocation Order (Northern Ireland) 2008 (S.R. 2008 No. 25)
- Salaries (Assembly Ombudsman and Commissioner for Complaints) Order (Northern Ireland) 2008 (S.R. 2008 No. 26)
- Eastermeade Gardens, Ballymoney (Abandonment) Order (Northern Ireland) 2008 (S.R. 2008 No. 27)
- Motor Vehicles (Wearing of Seat Belts) (Amendment) Regulations (Northern Ireland) 2008 (S.R. 2008 No. 29)
- Coroners (Practice and Procedure) (Amendment) Rules (Northern Ireland) 2008 (S.R. 2008 No. 32)
- Foyle Area and Carlingford Area (Angling) (Amendment) Regulations 2008 (S.R. 2008 No. 33)
- Less Favoured Area Compensatory Allowances Regulations (Northern Ireland) 2008 (S.R. 2008 No. 34)
- Magistrates’ Courts (Children (Northern Ireland) Order 1995) (Amendment) Rules (Northern Ireland) 2008 (S.R. 2008 No. 35)
- Trunk Road T15 (Carland Bridge Realignment) Order (Northern Ireland) 2008 (S.R. 2008 No. 36)
- Zootechnical Standards (Amendment) Regulations (Northern Ireland) 2008 (S.R. 2008 No. 37)
- Bluetongue Order (Northern Ireland) 2008 (S.R. 2008 No. 38)
- Travelling Expenses and Remission of Charges (Amendment) Regulations (Northern Ireland) 2008 (S.R. 2008 No. 39)
- Street Works (Inspection Fees) (Amendment) Regulations (Northern Ireland) 2008 (S.R. 2008 No. 40)
- Miscellaneous Food Additives (Amendment) Regulations (Northern Ireland) 2008 (S.R. 2008 No. 41)
- Condensed Milk and Dried Milk (Amendment) Regulations (Northern Ireland) 2008 (S.R. 2008 No. 42)
- Eastburn Avenue, Ballymoney (Abandonment) Order (Northern Ireland) 2008 (S.R. 2008 No. 44)
- Social Security (Industrial Injuries) (Prescribed Diseases) (Amendment) Regulations (Northern Ireland) 2008 (S.R. 2008 No. 45)
- Departments (Transfer of Functions) Order (Northern Ireland) 2008 (S.R. 2008 No. 46)
- Employment Rights (Increase of Limits) Order (Northern Ireland) 2008 (S.R. 2008 No. 47)
- Rates (Regional Rates) Order (Northern Ireland) 2008 (S.R. 2008 No. 48)
- Rates (Industrial Hereditaments) (Amendment) Order (Northern Ireland) 2008 (S.R. 2008 No. 49)
- Teachers’ Pensions (Miscellaneous Amendments) Regulations (Northern Ireland) 2008 (S.R. 2008 No. 50)
- Social Security (National Insurance Numbers) (Amendment) Regulations (Northern Ireland) 2008 (S.R. 2008 No. 51)
- Measuring Instruments (Use for Trade) (Amendment) Regulations (Northern Ireland) 2008 (S.R. 2008 No. 52)
- Animals and Animal Products (Import and Export) (Amendment) Regulations (Northern Ireland) 2008 (S.R. 2008 No. 53)
- Electricity (Offshore Wind and Water Driven Generating Stations) (Permitted Capacity) Order (Northern Ireland) 2008 (S.R. 2008 No. 54)
- Offshore Electricity Development (Environmental Impact Assessment) Regulations (Northern Ireland) 2008 (S.R. 2008 No. 55)
- Police Service of Northern Ireland (Conduct) (Amendment) Regulations 2008 (S.R. 2008 No. 56)
- Bluetongue (Amendment) Order (Northern Ireland) 2008 (S.R. 2008 No. 59)
- Plant Health (Import Inspection Fees) (Amendment) Regulations (Northern Ireland) 2008 (S.R. 2008 No. 60)
- Traffic Signs (Amendment) Regulations (Northern Ireland) 2008 (S.R. 2008 No. 63)
- Pensions (2008 Act) (Commencement No. 1) Order (Northern Ireland) 2008 (S.R. 2008 No. 65)
- Domestic Energy Efficiency Grants (Amendment) Regulations (Northern Ireland) 2008 (S.R. 2008 No. 67)
- Rate Relief (Qualifying Age) (Amendment) Regulations (Northern Ireland) 2008 (S.R. 2008 No. 68)
- Social Security (Claims and Payments) (Amendment) Regulations (Northern Ireland) 2008 (S.R. 2008 No. 69)
- Dairy Produce Quotas (Amendment) Regulations (Northern Ireland) 2008 (S.R. 2008 No. 70)
- Kirk Road, Ballymoney (Abandonment) Order (Northern Ireland) 2008 (S.R. 2008 No. 72)
- Pneumoconiosis, etc., (Workers’ Compensation) (Payment of Claims) (Amendment) Regulations (Northern Ireland) 2008 (S.R. 2008 No. 73)
- Waste (Amendment) (2007 Order) (Commencement No.2) Order (Northern Ireland) 2008 (S.R. 2008 No. 75)
- Conduct of Employment Agencies and Employment Businesses (Amendment) Regulations (Northern Ireland) 2008 (S.R. 2008 No. 76)
- Producer Responsibility Obligations (Packaging Waste) (Amendment) Regulations (Northern Ireland) 2008 (S.R. 2008 No. 77)
- Penalty Charges (Additional Contravention) Regulations (Northern Ireland) 2008 (S.R. 2008 No. 78)
- Special Educational Needs and Disability (General Qualifications Bodies) (Relevant Qualifications, Reasonable Steps and Physical Features) Regulations (Northern Ireland) 2008 (S.R. 2008 No. 79)
- Disability Discrimination (Private Clubs, etc.) Regulations (Northern Ireland) 2008 (S.R. 2008 No. 81)
- Meat Products (Amendment) Regulations (Northern Ireland) 2008 (S.R. 2008 No. 82)
- Pig Production Development (Levy) Revocation (No. 2) Order (Northern Ireland) 2008 (S.R. 2008 No. 83)
- Guaranteed Minimum Pensions Increase Order (Northern Ireland) 2008 (S.R. 2008 No. 84)
- Plant Protection Products (Amendment) Regulations (Northern Ireland) 2008 (S.R. 2008 No. 85)
- Social Security Pensions (Home Responsibilities) (Amendment) Regulations (Northern Ireland) 2008 (S.R. 2008 No. 88)
- Meat (Official Controls Charges) Regulations (Northern Ireland) 2008 (S.R. 2008 No. 89)
- Recovery of Health Services Charges (Amounts) (Amendment) Regulations (Northern Ireland) 2008 (S.R. 2008 No. 90)
- Health and Personal Social Services (Assessment of Resources) (Amendment) Regulations (Northern Ireland) 2008 (S.R. 2008 No. 91)
- Social Security Benefits Up-rating Order (Northern Ireland) 2008 (S.R. 2008 No. 92)
- Welfare Reform (2007 Act) (Commencement No. 3) Order (Northern Ireland) 2008 (S.R. 2008 No. 93)
- Insolvency (Disqualification from Office: General) Order (Northern Ireland) 2008 (S.R. 2008 No. 94)
- Certification Officer (Fees) Regulations (Northern Ireland) 2008 (S.R. 2008 No. 95)
- Health and Personal Social Services (Superannuation Scheme and Compensation for Premature Retirement) (Amendment) Regulations (Northern Ireland) 2008 (S.R. 2008 No. 96)
- Occupational and Personal Pension Schemes (General Levy) (Amendment) Regulations (Northern Ireland) 2008 (S.R. 2008 No. 97)
- Eggs and Chicks Regulations (Northern Ireland) 2008c S.R. 2008 No. 98)
- Rice Products from the United States of America (Restriction on First Placing on the Market) Regulations (Northern Ireland) 2008 (S.R. 2008 No. 99)
- Housing Benefit (Executive Determinations) Regulations (Northern Ireland) 2008 (S.R. 2008 No. 100)

== 101-200 ==
- Housing Benefit (Local Housing Allowance) (Amendment) Regulations ( Northern Ireland) 2008 101)
- Housing Benefit (State Pension Credit) (Local Housing Allowance) (Amendment) Regulations (Northern Ireland) 2008 (S.R. 2008 No. 102)
- Housing Benefit (Local Housing Allowance) (Miscellaneous and Consequential Amendments) Regulations (Northern Ireland) 2008 (S.R. 2008 No. 103)
- Pensions (2005 Order) (Commencement No. 11) Order (Northern Ireland) 2008 (S.R. 2008 No. 104)
- Social Security Benefits Up-rating Regulations (Northern Ireland) 2008 (S.R. 2008 No. 105)
- Legal Advice and Assistance (Amendment) Regulations (Northern Ireland) 2008 (S.R. 2008 No. 106)
- Legal Advice and Assistance (Financial Conditions) Regulations (Northern Ireland) 2008 (S.R. 2008 No. 107)
- Legal Aid (Financial Conditions) Regulations (Northern Ireland) 2008 (S.R. 2008 No. S.R. 2008 No. 108)
- Motor Vehicle Testing (Amendment) Regulations (Northern Ireland) 2008 (S.R. 2008 No. S.R. 2008 No. 109)
- Discretionary Financial Assistance (Amendment) Regulations ( Northern Ireland) 2008 (S.R. 2008 No. 111)
- Social Security (Miscellaneous Amendments) Regulations ( Northern Ireland) 2008 (S.R. 2008 No. 112)
- Social Security (Industrial Injuries) (Dependency) (Permitted Earnings Limit) Order ( Northern Ireland) 2008 (S.R. 2008 No. 113)
- Seeds (Miscellaneous Amendments) Regulations (Northern Ireland) 2008 (S.R. 2008 No. 114)
- Workmen’s Compensation (Supplementation) (Amendment) Regulations (Northern Ireland) 2008 (S.R. 2008 No. 115)
- Occupational Pension Schemes (Internal Dispute Resolution Procedures) (Consequential and Miscellaneous Amendments) Regulations (Northern Ireland) 2008 (S.R. 2008 No. 116)
- Occupational Pension Schemes (Non-European Schemes Exemption) Regulations (Northern Ireland) 2008 (S.R. 2008 No. 117)
- Insolvency (Amendment) Rules (Northern Ireland) 2008 (S.R. 2008 No. 118)
- Child Support (Miscellaneous Amendments) Regulations (Northern Ireland) 2008 (S.R. 2008 No. 119)
- Social Security Pensions (Low Earnings Threshold) Order (Northern Ireland) 2008 (S.R. 2008 No. 120)
- Social Security Revaluation of Earnings Factors Order (Northern Ireland) 2008 (S.R. 2008 No. 121)
- Pensions Increase (Review) Order (Northern Ireland) 2008 (S.R. 2008 No. 123)
- Rate Relief (Lone Pensioner Allowance) Regulations (Northern Ireland) 2008 (S.R. 2008 No. 124)
- Potatoes Originating in Egypt (Amendment) Regulations (Northern Ireland) 2008 (S.R. 2008 No. 125)
- Honey (Amendment) Regulations (Northern Ireland) 2008 (S.R. 2008 No. 126)
- Safeguarding Vulnerable Groups (2007 Order) (Commencement No. 1) Order (Northern Ireland) 2008 (S.R. 2008 No. 127)
- Optical Charges and Payments (Amendment) Regulations (Northern Ireland) 2008 (S.R. 2008 No. 128)
- Education (Student Loans) (Repayment) (Amendment) Regulations (Northern Ireland) 2008 (S.R. 2008 No. 129)
- Health and Personal Social Services (Superannuation Scheme, Injury Benefits, Additional Voluntary Contributions and Compensation for Premature Retirement) (Amendment) Regulations (Northern Ireland) 2008 (S.R. 2008 No. 130)
- Healthy Start Scheme and Day Care Food Scheme (Amendment) Regulations (Northern Ireland) 2008 (S.R. 2008 No. 131)
- Occupational Pension Schemes (Employer Debt and Miscellaneous Amendments) Regulations (Northern Ireland) 2008 (S.R. 2008 No. 132)
- Companies (Late Filing Penalties) Regulations (Northern Ireland) 2008 (S.R. 2008 No. 133)
- Limited Liability Partnerships (Filing Periods and Late Filing Penalties) Regulations (Northern Ireland) 2008 (S.R. 2008 No. 134)
- Motorways Traffic Regulations (Northern Ireland) 2008 (S.R. 2008 No. 135)
- Ballyboley Road, Larne (Abandonment) Order ( Northern Ireland) 2008 (S.R. 2008 No. 136)
- Waste and Contaminated Land (1997 Order) (Commencement No. 8) Order (Northern Ireland) 2008 (S.R. 2008 No. 138)
- Health and Personal Social Services (Joint Committee for Commissioning) (Amendment) Order (Northern Ireland) 2008 (S.R. 2008 No. 139)
- Disability Discrimination (Guidance on the Definition of Disability) (Revocation) Order (Northern Ireland) 2008 (S.R. 2008 No. 140)
- Disability Discrimination (Guidance on the Definition of Disability) (Appointed Day) Order (Northern Ireland) 2008 (S.R. 2008 No. 141)
- Health and Social Services Trusts (Originating Capital) Order (Northern Ireland) 2008 (S.R. 2008 No. 142)
- Donaghadee (Harbour Area) Order (Northern Ireland) 2008 (S.R. 2008 No. 143)
- Occupational Pension Schemes (Levy Ceiling) Order (Northern Ireland) 2008 (S.R. 2008 No. 144)
- Occupational Pension Schemes (Levies) (Amendment) Regulations (Northern Ireland) 2008 (S.R. 2008 No. 145)
- Pension Protection Fund (Pension Compensation Cap) Order (Northern Ireland) 2008 (S.R. 2008 No. 146)
- Welfare Reform (2007 Act) (Commencement No. 4 and Consequential Provisions) Order (Northern Ireland) 2008 (S.R. 2008 No. 147)
- B2 Silverwood Road, Lurgan (Abandonment) Order (Northern Ireland) 2008 (S.R. 2008 No. 149)
- Valuation Tribunal (Amendment) Rules (Northern Ireland) 2008 (S.R. 2008 No. 153)
- District Judge (Magistrates’ Courts) Order (Northern Ireland) 2008 (S.R. 2008 No. 154)
- Court Funds (Amendment) Rules (Northern Ireland) 2008 (S.R. 2008 No. 156)
- Sex Discrimination Order 1976 (Amendment) Regulations (Northern Ireland) 2008 (S.R. 2008 No. 159)
- Waste Management Licences (Consultation and Compensation) Regulations (Northern Ireland) 2008 (S.R. 2008 No. 160)
- Companies (Tables A to F) (Amendment) Regulations (Northern Ireland) 2008 (S.R. 2008 No. 161)
- Health and Personal Social Services (Superannuation) (Amendment) Regulations (Northern Ireland) 2008 (S.R. 2008 No. 163)
- Plastic Materials and Articles in Contact with Food Regulations (Northern Ireland) 2008 (S.R. 2008 No. 167)
- Social Security (Work-focused Interviews for Partners) (Amendment) Regulations (Northern Ireland) 2008 (S.R. 2008 No. 169)
- Energy Performance of Buildings (Certificates and Inspections) Regulations (Northern Ireland) 2008 (S.R. 2008 No. 170)
- Specified Products from China (Restriction on First Placing on the Market) Regulations (Northern Ireland) 2008 (S.R. 2008 No. 171)
- Organic Farming Regulations (Northern Ireland) 2008 (S.R. 2008 No. 172)
- Antiville and Ballymena Road, Larne (Abandonment) Order (Northern Ireland) 2008 (S.R. 2008 No. 173)
- Countryside Management Regulations (Northern Ireland) 2008 (S.R. 2008 No. 174)
- Special Educational Needs and Disability (2005 Order) (Amendment) (General Qualifications Bodies) (Alteration of Premises and Enforcement) Regulations (Northern Ireland) 2008 (S.R. 2008 No. 177)
- Occupational Pension Schemes (Employer Debt: Apportionment Arrangements) (Amendment) Regulations (Northern Ireland) 2008 (S.R. 2008 No. 178)
- Social Security (Miscellaneous Amendments No. 2) Regulations (Northern Ireland) 2008 (S.R. 2008 No. 179)
- Fish Health (Amendment) Regulations (Northern Ireland) 2008 (S.R. 2008 No. 183)
- Seed Potatoes (Crop Fees) (Amendment) Regulations (Northern Ireland) 2008 (S.R. 2008 No. 184)
- Unlicensed Fishing for Crabs and Lobster Regulations (Northern Ireland) 2008 (S.R. 2008 No. 185)
- Financial Assistance for Young Farmers Scheme (Amendment) Order (Northern Ireland) 2008 (S.R. 2008 No. 186)
- Transmissible Spongiform Encephalopathies (Amendment) Regulations (Northern Ireland) 2008 (S.R. 2008 No. 188)
- Olive Oil (Marketing Standards) Regulations (Northern Ireland) 2008 (S.R. 2008 No. 189)
- Whole of Government Accounts (Designation of Bodies) Order (Northern Ireland) 2008 (S.R. 2008 No. 191)
- European Qualifications (Pharmacy) Regulations (Northern Ireland) 2008 (S.R. 2008 No. 192)
- Registration of Pharmaceutical Chemists (Exempt Persons) Regulations (Northern Ireland) 2008 (S.R. 2008 No. 193)
- Common Agricultural Policy Single Payment and Support Schemes (Amendment) Regulations (Northern Ireland) 2008 (S.R. 2008 No. 194)
- Pesticides (Maximum Residue Levels in Crops, Food and Feeding Stuffs) (Amendment) Regulations (Northern Ireland) 2008 (S.R. 2008 No. 195)
- Nitrates Action Programme (Amendment) Regulations (Northern Ireland) 2008 (S.R. 2008 No. 196)
- Avian Influenza (Miscellaneous Amendments) Regulations (Northern Ireland) 2008 (S.R. 2008 No. 197)
- Food Labelling (Declaration of Allergens) Regulations (Northern Ireland) 2008 (S.R. 2008 No. 198)
- County Court (Amendment) Rules (Northern Ireland) 2008 (S.R. 2008 No. 199)
- Safeguarding Vulnerable Groups (Transitional Provisions) Order (Northern Ireland) 2008 (S.R. 2008 No. 200)

== 201-300 ==
- Safeguarding Vulnerable Groups (Prescribed Criteria) (Transitional Provisions) Regulations (Northern Ireland) 2008 (S.R. 2008 No. 201)
- Safeguarding Vulnerable Groups (Barred List Prescribed Information) Regulations (Northern Ireland) 2008 (S.R. 2008 No. 202)
- Safeguarding Vulnerable Groups (Barring Procedure) Regulations (Northern Ireland) 2008 (S.R. 2008 No. 203)
- Plant Health (Amendment) Order (Northern Ireland) 2008 (S.R. 2008 No. 205)
- Criminal Justice (Northern Ireland) Order 2008 (Commencement No.1 and Savings and Transitory Provisions) Order 2008 (S.R. 2008 No. 217)
- General Register Office (Fees) Order (Northern Ireland) 2008 (S.R. 2008 No. 219)
- Pharmaceutical Society of Northern Ireland (General) (Amendment) Regulations (Northern Ireland) 2008 (S.R. 2008 No. 222)
- Road Traffic (2007 Order) (Commencement No. 3 and Amendment) Order (Northern Ireland) 2008 (S.R. 2008 No. 223)
- Magistrates’ Courts (Children (Northern Ireland) Order 1995) (Amendment No. 2) Rules (Northern Ireland) 2008 (S.R. 2008 No. 225)
- Valuation (Water Undertaking) Regulations (Northern Ireland) 2008 (S.R. 2008 No. 226)
- Taxis (Antrim) Bye-Laws (Northern Ireland) 2008 (S.R. 2008 No. 230)
- Quality of Bathing Water Regulations (Northern Ireland) 2008 (S.R. 2008 No. 231)
- Foyle and Carlingford Fisheries (2007 Order) (Commencement No. 1) Order (Northern Ireland) 2008 2S.R. 2008 No. 32)
- Safeguarding Vulnerable Groups (2007 Order) (Commencement No. 2) Order (Northern Ireland) 2008 (S.R. 2008 No. 233)
- Disclosure of Vehicle Insurance Information Regulations (Northern Ireland) 2008 (S.R. 2008 No. 234)
- Planning (Avian Influenza) (Special Development) Order (Northern Ireland) 2008 (S.R. 2008 No. 235)
- Disability Discrimination Act 1995 (Commencement No. 10) Order (Northern Ireland) 2008 (S.R. 2008 No. 236)
- Drinking Milk Regulations (Northern Ireland) 2008 (S.R. 2008 No. 237)
- Firefighters’ Compensation Scheme (Amendment) Order (Northern Ireland) 2008 (S.R. 2008 No. 238)
- Spreadable Fats (Marketing Standards) and the Milk and Milk Products (Protection of Designations) Regulations (Northern Ireland) 2008 (S.R. 2008 No. 239)
- Reporting of Prices of Milk Products Regulations (Northern Ireland) 2008 (S.R. 2008 No. 240)
- Energy Performance of Buildings (Certificates and Inspections) (Amendment) Regulations (Northern Ireland) 2008 (S.R. 2008 No. 241)
- Police Powers for Designated Staff (Complaints and Misconduct) Regulations (Northern Ireland) 2008 (S.R. 2008 No. 242)
- Road Traffic (2007 Order) (Commencement No. 4 and Amendment) Order (Northern Ireland) 2008 (S.R. 2008 No. 244)
- Police Powers for Designated Staff (Code of Ethics) Order (Northern Ireland) 2008 (S.R. 2008 No. 243)
- Motor Hackney Carriages (Belfast) (Amendment) By-Laws (Northern Ireland) 2008 (S.R. 2008 No. 245)
- Legal Aid in Criminal Proceedings (Costs) (Amendment) Rules (Northern Ireland) 2008 (S.R. 2008 No. 248)
- Care Tribunal (Amendment) Regulations (Northern Ireland) 2008 (S.R. 2008 No. 249)
- Education (Student Support) Regulations (Northern Ireland) 2008 (S.R. 2008 No. 250)
- Magistrates’ Courts (Amendment) Rules (Northern Ireland) 2008 (S.R. 2008 No. 251)
- Magistrates’ Courts (Criminal Justice (Children)) (Amendment) Rules (Northern Ireland) 2008 (S.R. 2008 No. 252)
- Magistrates’ Courts (Anti-social Behaviour Orders) (Amendment) Rules (Northern Ireland) 2008 (S.R. 2008 No. 253)
- Students Awards (Amendment) Regulations (Northern Ireland) 2008 (S.R. 2008 No. 254)
- Education (Student Loans) (Amendment) Regulations (Northern Ireland) 2008 (S.R. 2008 No. 255)
- Health and Social Care (Pension Scheme) Regulations (Northern Ireland) 2008 (S.R. 2008 No. 256)
- Taxis (Enniskillen) (Revocation) Bye-Laws (Northern Ireland) 2008 (S.R. 2008 No. 257)
- Social Security (Industrial Injuries) (Prescribed Diseases) (Amendment No. 2) Regulations (Northern Ireland) 2008 (S.R. 2008 No. 258)
- Family Proceedings (Amendment No. 2) Rules (Northern Ireland) 2008 (S.R. 2008 No. 259)
- Feeding Stuffs (Amendment) Regulations (Northern Ireland) 2008 (S.R. 2008 No. 260)
- Insolvency (Voluntary Winding Up) (Forms) Regulations (Northern Ireland) 2008 (S.R. 2008 No. 261)
- Social Security (Students and Miscellaneous Amendments) Regulations (Northern Ireland) 2008 (S.R. 2008 No. 262)
- Control of Salmonella in Poultry Scheme Order (Northern Ireland) 2008 (S.R. 2008 No. 263)
- Companies (Public Sector Audit) Order (Northern Ireland) 2008 (S.R. 2008 No. 264)
- Plastic Materials and Articles in Contact with Food (Amendment) Regulations (Northern Ireland) 2008 (S.R. 2008 No. 271)
- Diseases of Animals (Approval of Disinfectants) Order (Northern Ireland) 2008 (S.R. 2008 No. 272)
- Bluetongue Regulations (Northern Ireland) 2008 (S.R. 2008 No. 275)
- Welfare Reform (2007 Act) (Commencement No. 5) Order (Northern Ireland) 2008 (S.R. 2008 No. 276)
- Welfare of Animals (Slaughter or Killing) (Amendment) Regulations (Northern Ireland) 2008 (S.R. 2008 No. 277)
- Environmental Impact Assessment (Agriculture) (Amendment) Regulations (Northern Ireland) 2008 (S.R. 2008 No. 278)
- Employment and Support Allowance Regulations (Northern Ireland) 2008 (S.R. 2008 No. 280)
- Penalty Fares (Increase) Order (Northern Ireland) 2008 (S.R. 2008 No. 281)
- Smoke Control Areas (Exempted Fireplaces) (Amendment) Regulations (Northern Ireland) 2008 (S.R. 2008 No. 282)
- Employment and Support Allowance (Transitional Provisions) Regulations (Northern Ireland) 2008 (S.R. 2008 No. 283)
- Housing Benefit (Extended Payments) (Amendment) Regulations (Northern Ireland) 2008 (S.R. 2008 No. 285)
- Employment and Support Allowance (Consequential Provisions) Regulations (Northern Ireland) 2008 (S.R. 2008 No. 286)
- Guarantees of Origin of Electricity Produced from High-efficiency Cogeneration Regulations (Northern Ireland) 2008 (S.R. 2008 No. 287)
- Social Fund Winter Fuel Payment (Temporary Increase) Regulations (Northern Ireland) 2008 (S.R. 2008 No. 289)
- Social Security (Students Responsible for Children or Young Persons) (Amendment) Regulations (Northern Ireland) 2008 (S.R. 2008 No. 290)
- Child Maintenance (2008 Act) (Commencement No. 1) Order (Northern Ireland) 2008 (S.R. 2008 No. 291)
- Travelling Expenses and Remission of Charges (Amendment No. 2) Regulations (Northern Ireland) 2008 (S.R. 2008 No. 292)
- Criminal Justice (Northern Ireland) Order 2008 (Commencement No. 2) Order 2008 (S.R. 2008 No. 293)
- Industrial Training Levy (Construction Industry) Order (Northern Ireland) 2008 (S.R. 2008 No. 294)
- Farm Modernisation Programme Regulations (Northern Ireland) 2008 (S.R. 2008 No. 295)
- Supply Chain Development Programme Grant Regulations (Northern Ireland) 2008 (S.R. 2008 No. 296)
- Vocational Training and Information Actions Grant Regulations (Northern Ireland) 2008 (S.R. 2008 No. 297)
- Foyle Area (Control of Oyster Fishing) Regulations 2008 (S.R. 2008 No. 298)
- Foyle Area (Landing Areas for Oysters) Regulations 2008 (S.R. 2008 No. 299)
- Foyle Area (Licensing of Oyster Fishing) Regulations 2008 (S.R. 2008 No. 300)

== 301-400 ==
- Foyle Area (Oyster Logbook and Identification Tagging) Regulations 2008 (S.R. 2008 No. 301)
- Foyle Area and Carlingford Area (Prohibition of Sale of Salmon and Sea Trout Caught by Rod and Line) Regulations 2008 (S.R. 2008 No. 302)
- Pension Protection Fund (Entry Rules) (Amendment) Regulations (Northern Ireland) 2008 (S.R. 2008 No. 303)
- Inshore Fishing (Prohibition of Fishing and Fishing Methods) (Amendment) Regulations (Northern Ireland) 2008 (S.R. 2008 No. 304)
- Pensions (2005 Order) (Code of Practice) (Dispute Resolution) (Appointed Day) Order (Northern Ireland) 2008 (S.R. 2008 No. 305)
- Children and Young Persons (Sale of Tobacco etc.) Regulations (Northern Ireland) 2008 (S.R. 2008 No. 306)
- Smoke-free (Exemptions, Vehicles, Penalties and Discounted Amounts) (Amendment) Regulations (Northern Ireland) 2008 (S.R. 2008 No. 307)
- Local Government (Constituting a Joint Committee a Body Corporate) Order (Northern Ireland) 2008 (S.R. 2008 No. 310)
- Police Trainee (Amendment) Regulations (Northern Ireland) 2008 (S.R. 2008 No. 314)
- Cross-border Railway Services (Working Time) Regulations (Northern Ireland) 2008 (S.R. 2008 No. 315)
- Fisheries (Amendment) Byelaws (Northern Ireland) 2008 (S.R. 2008 No. 318)
- Fisheries (Conservation of Coarse Fish) Byelaws (Northern Ireland) 2008 (S.R. 2008 No. 319)
- Milk and Milk Products (Pupils in Educational Establishments) Regulations (Northern Ireland) 2008 (S.R. 2008 No. 323)
- Further Education (Student Support) (Eligibility) Regulations (Northern Ireland) 2008 (S.R. 2008 No. 324)
- Police (Testing for Substance Misuse) Regulations (Northern Ireland) 2008 (S.R. 2008 No. 325)
- Fixed-term Employees (Prevention of Less Favourable Treatment) (Amendment) Regulations (Northern Ireland) 2008 (S.R. 2008 No. 326)
- Westlink (Busways) Regulations (Northern Ireland) 2008 (S.R. 2008 No. 328)
- Child Maintenance (2008 Act) (Commencement No. 2) Order (Northern Ireland) 2008 (S.R. 2008 No. 331)
- Public Health (Ships) Regulations (Northern Ireland) 2008 (S.R. 2008 No. 333)
- Specified Animal Pathogens Order (Northern Ireland) 2008 (S.R. 2008 No. 336)
- Welfare Reform (2007 Act) (Commencement No. 6 and Transitional and Savings Provisions) Order (Northern Ireland) 2008 (S.R. 2008 No. 339)
- Zoonoses (Monitoring) Regulations (Northern Ireland) 2008 (S.R. 2008 No. 340)
- Road Traffic (Traffic Wardens) (Revocation) Order (Northern Ireland) 2008 (S.R. 2008 No. 341)
- Welfare Reform Act (Relevant Statutory Provision) Order (Northern Ireland) 2008 (S.R. 2008 No. 342)
- Social Security (Use of Information for Housing Benefit and Welfare Services Purposes) Regulations (Northern Ireland) 2008 (S.R. 2008 No. 343)
- Motor Vehicles (Speed Limits) (Amendment) Regulations (Northern Ireland) 2008 (S.R. 2008 No. 344)
- Establishments and Agencies (Fitness of Workers) Regulations (Northern Ireland) 2008 (S.R. 2008 No. 346)
- Health and Personal Social Services (Superannuation) (Additional Voluntary Contributions, Injury Benefits and Compensation for Premature Retirement) (Amendment) Regulations (Northern Ireland) 2008 (S.R. 2008 No. 350)
- Mesothelioma, etc., (2008 Act) (Commencement) Order (Northern Ireland) 2008 (S.R. 2008 No. 351)
- Pneumoconiosis, etc., (Workers’ Compensation) (Payment of Claims) (Amendment No. 2) Regulations (Northern Ireland) 2008 (S.R. 2008 No. 352)
- Mesothelioma Lump Sum Payments (Claims and Reconsiderations) Regulations (Northern Ireland) 2008 (S.R. 2008 No. 353)
- Mesothelioma Lump Sum Payments (Conditions and Amounts) Regulations (Northern Ireland) 2008 (S.R. 2008 No. 354)
- Social Security (Recovery of Benefits) (Lump Sum Payments) Regulations (Northern Ireland) 2008 (S.R. 2008 No. 355)
- Statutory Sick Pay (General) (Amendment) Regulations (Northern Ireland) 2008 (S.R. 2008 No. 356)
- Social Fund (Applications and Miscellaneous Provisions) Regulations (Northern Ireland) 2008 (S.R. 2008 No. 357)
- Zoonoses and Animal By-Products (Fees) Regulations (Northern Ireland) 2008 (S.R. 2008 No. 359)
