= Home REIT =

British property company

- Company type: Public limited company
- Traded as: LSE: HOME
- Industry: Property
- Founded: 2020; 6 years ago
- Headquarters: London, United Kingdom
- Key people: Lynne Fennah (chairman)
- Revenue: ▲£38.0 million (2024)
- Operating income: ▲£(21.2) million (2024)
- Net income: ▲£(25.2) million (2024)
- Website: www.homereituk.com

Home REIT is a property company which invests in the provision of sheltered housing for homeless people throughout the United Kingdom. The company is listed on the London Stock Exchange.

== History ==
Home REIT was launched on the London Stock Exchange in October 2020 raising £240 million in what turned out to be the largest initial public offering of any investment trust in the year. It used the proceeds to invest in some 500 properties for homeless people around the United Kingdom.

The company went on to raise a further £350 million in September 2021, and used the proceeds to buy another 366 properties. After that, it raised another £150 million in May 2022, and used the proceeds to acquire another 216 properties, so diversifying its portfolio of sheltered accommodation for homeless people such that, by then, the properties were let to 28 charities or housing associations in 126 local authority areas.

On 7 December 2022, a group of shareholders claimed the company had misled the market by investing in properties occupied by tenants who are not vulnerable and therefore would not qualify for Housing Benefit payments. The company denied the allegations. It admitted on 15 December 2022 that it had no record of how much of its income comes from Housing Benefit payments, on which it is significantly dependent.

In January 2023, the trading in Home Reit shares was suspended, after the value of the company had reduced by over 70%.

== Operations ==
The company specialises in property for homeless people in the United Kingdom. It is managed by AEW UK Investment Management LLP and lets the properties to registered charities and housing associations on leases of between 20 and 30 years. Its portfolio was valued at £327.9 million as at 31 August 2021 and, by May 2022, it had created a portfolio offering 8,500 beds in sheltered accommodation for homeless people.

== Controversy ==
In 2024, the Serious Fraud Office opened an investigation into the company over whether fund managers misled the market. In January 2026, the National Crime Agency and Serious Fraud Office arrested six people and raided seven sites linked to Home Reit.
