= Lall v Westminster City Council =

2013 law case in England

Lall v Westminster City Council was a 2013 case in England where barrister Surinder Lall who is blind successfully challenged Westminster City Council who wanted to apply the "bedroom tax" to his housing association property. Lall argued that the room in question had never been a bedroom meaning he should not face a reduction in housing benefit.
