= Welfare Reform Act 2009 =

Act of the Parliament of the United Kingdom

Welfare Reform Act 2009 (Note: Section 62.)
- Act of Parliament
- Parliament of the United Kingdom
- Long title: An Act to amend the law relating to social security; to make provision enabling disabled people to be given greater control over the way in which certain public services are provided for them; to amend the law relating to child support; to make provision about the registration of births; and for connected purposes.
- Citation: 2009 c. 24
- Introduced by: James Purnell, Secretary of State for Work and Pensions (Commons)
- Territorial extent: England and Wales; Scotland; (Note: Section 60.)

Dates
- Royal assent: 12 November 2009
- Commencement: Various (Note: Section 61.)
Other legislation
Amends	Magistrates' Courts Act 1980; Social Security Contributions and Benefits Act 1992; Social Security Administration Act 1992; Social Security (Consequential Provisions) Act 1992; Jobseekers Act 1995; Employment Tribunals Act 1996; Employment Rights Act 1996; Education Act 1996; Child Benefit Act 2005; Child Maintenance and Other Payments Act 2008
Amended by	Criminal Justice and Immigration Act 2008; Identity Documents Act 2010; Wales Act 2017

Status: Amended

History of passage through Parliament

Text of statute as originally enacted

Revised text of statute as amended

The Welfare Reform Act 2009 (c. 24) is an act of the Parliament of the United Kingdom. It reforms the law relating to social security benefits.

The act established Employment and Support Allowance, which replaces existing Incapacity Benefit.

The act introduced increased benefit conditionality, expanded requirements to undertake work-related activity and introduced sanctions for non-compliance with various obligations.

The act gave disabled people a "right to control" state support spent on them.

== See also ==
- Welfare Reform Act
