= Child Maintenance and Other Payments Act 2008 =

Act of the Parliament of the United Kingdom

Child Maintenance and Other Payments Act 2008 (Note: Section 63.)
- Act of Parliament
- Parliament of the United Kingdom
- Long title: An Act to establish the Child Maintenance and Enforcement Commission; to amend the law relating to child support; to make provision about lump sum payments to or in respect of persons with diffuse mesothelioma; and for connected purposes.
- Citation: 2008 c. 6
- Introduced by: John Hutton (Commons)
- Territorial extent: England and Wales; Scotland; Northern Ireland (in part); (Note: Section 61.)

Dates
- Royal assent: 5 June 2008
- Commencement: Various (Note: Section 62.)
Other legislation
Amends	Public Records Act 1958; Parliamentary Commissioner Act 1967; House of Commons Disqualification Act 1975; Northern Ireland Assembly Disqualification Act 1975; Debtors (Scotland) Act 1987; Child Support Act 1991; Social Security Administration Act 1992; Child Support Act 1995; Social Security (Recovery of Benefits) Act 1997; Social Security Act 1998; Welfare Reform and Pensions Act 1999; Child Support, Pensions and Social Security Act 2000; Freedom of Information Act 2000; Tax Credits Act 2002; Employment Act 2002; Debt Arrangement and Attachment (Scotland) Act 2002; Civil Partnership Act 2004; Welfare Reform Act 2007; Tribunals, Courts and Enforcement Act 2007; Bankruptcy and Diligence etc. (Scotland) Act 2007
Amended by	Transfer of Tribunal Functions Order 2008; Welfare Reform Act 2009; Public Bodies (Child Maintenance and Enforcement Commission: Abolition and Transfer of Functions) Order 2012; Welfare Reform Act 2012; Mesothelioma Act 2014; Child Support (Enforcement) Act 2023

Status: Amended

History of passage through Parliament

Text of statute as originally enacted

Revised text of statute as amended

The Child Maintenance and Other Payments Act 2008 (c. 6) is an act of the Parliament of the United Kingdom.

== Provisions ==
The act established the Child Maintenance and Enforcement Commission. The act allowed for the writing off of child maintenance debt. The act allows for the removal of passports, but this has never been implemented in the scheme, as of January 2018.
