= Vaccine Damage Payments Act 1979 =

Act of the Parliament of the United Kingdom

Vaccine Damage Payments Act 1979 (Note: Section 13(1).)
- Act of Parliament
- Parliament of the United Kingdom
- Long title: An Act to provide for payments to be made out of public funds in cases where severe disablement occurs as a result of vaccination against certain diseases or of contact with a person who has been vaccinated against any of those diseases; to make provision in connection with similar payments made before the passing of this Act; and for purposes connected therewith.
- Citation: 1979 c. 17
- Territorial extent: United Kingdom; Isle of Man; (Note: Section 13(2).)

Dates
- Royal assent: 22 March 1979
- Commencement: 22 March 1979 (Note: Section 4(b) of the Interpretation Act 1978.)
Other legislation
Amends	Wales Act 1978; Scotland Act 1978
Amended by	Vaccine Damage Payments Regulations 1979; Statute Law (Repeals) Act 1981; Social Security Act 1985; Social Security (Consequential Provisions) Act 1992; Social Security (Consequential Provisions) (Northern Ireland) Act 1992; Social Security Act 1998; Vaccine Damage Payments (Specified Disease) Order 2001; Regulatory Reform (Vaccine Damage Payments Act 1979) Order 2002; Welfare Reform Act 2007; Transfer of Tribunal Functions Order 2008; Welfare Reform Act 2012; Vaccine Damage Payments (Specified Disease) Order 2015; Vaccine Damage Payments (Specified Disease) Order 2016; Vaccine Damage Payments (Specified Disease) Order 2020; Vaccine Damage Payments (Specified Disease) (Amendment) Order 2021

Status: Amended

Text of statute as originally enacted

Revised text of statute as amended

Text of the Vaccine Damage Payments Act 1979 as in force today (including any amendments) within the United Kingdom, from legislation.gov.uk.

The Vaccine Damage Payments Act 1979 (c. 17) is an act of the Parliament of the United Kingdom that provides for compensation payments for injuries caused by vaccination.

It was introduced following concerns over the pertussis vaccine.
