= Local Housing Allowance =

Regulation governing renters' welfare payments in the UK

The Local Housing Allowance (LHA) was introduced by the government of the United Kingdom on 7 April 2008 to provide an indication of Housing Benefit entitlement for tenants renting private-sector accommodation in England, Scotland and Wales. The LHA system introduced significant changes to the way Housing Benefit (HB) levels are restricted and how benefit is paid. It did not replace Housing Benefit but amended the process for calculating entitlement under the existing Housing Benefit scheme. The allowance is based on the 30th percentile of local rented accommodation, while the 50th percentile or median was used from the introduction of the policy until 2011. LHA rates relate to the area in which the housing benefit claim is made. These areas are called "Broad Rental Market Areas", defined as "where a person could reasonably be expected to live taking into account access to facilities and services", and a selection of rents in the area are used to determine the LHA for each category of housing in the area.

LHA rates were created by the Department for Work and Pensions with the goal of controlling costs and establishing a standard amount for those in receipt of Housing Benefit. LHA rates ensured that tenants in similar circumstances and areas could claim similar amounts; i.e. based on their needs rather than based on their property, and so that it was possible to know in advance how much rent could be covered by housing benefit in a given area. However it was found after LHA's first limited implementation in 9 Broad Rental Market Areas that rent levels rose more rapidly in those areas – particularly in those parts of these areas where previously the price was lowest – resulting in criticism that LHA could increase homelessness and remove the poor and unemployed from areas in which they could more easily find work, or find access to vital services related to disability needs.

Since 2012, year-on-year LHA increases are capped based on the rise in the Consumer Price Index, even if the 30th percentile of rents that year would mean a larger rise in the rate, thereby changing the underpinning of the policy from one where LHA rates are tied to the actual rents in a given area at a certain time to one where the rate is based on a standard increase each year, similar to most other benefits such as Jobseekers Allowance, Employment Support Allowance, etc. In 2015, Chancellor of the Exchequer George Osborne announced a complete freeze on LHA rates until 2020, though the some high-cost areas receive a 3% uplift in LHA rates from Targeted Affordability Funding (TAF).

== Background ==
In October 2002 the Government announced the introduction of the Local Housing Allowance (LHA) to replace existing Housing Benefit rent restrictions for private tenants. Local Housing Allowance uses the same regulations as the existing scheme. LHA is means tested and tapered in exactly the same way as Housing Benefit - however, the eligible rent is fixed for a household of a given size in a given region. This region will include many towns. Housing Benefit is not normally restricted below the advertised LHA rate; up until 2009 a tenant moving into accommodation cheaper than the LHA rate was allowed to keep the difference, after 2009 this was limited to a maximum of £15.

Local Housing Allowance was introduced starting in November 2003 as part of a wider review of Housing Benefit regulations in nine 'Pathfinder' or pilot areas: Blackpool, Brighton & Hove, Conwy, Coventry, Edinburgh, Leeds, Lewisham, North East Lincolnshire and Teignbridge - starting in Blackpool in 2003. From April 2005 a further nine councils started to implement the LHA, starting with Wandsworth, followed by East Riding, St Helens, Argyll and Bute, South Norfolk, Norwich, Pembrokeshire, Guildford and Salford.

An evaluation of the operation of the LHA was commissioned by the Department for Work and Pensions, and carried out by The Centre for Housing Policy, working as part of a consortium of universities, together with the National Centre for Social Research.

== Operation ==
Housing Benefit is a means tested social security benefit in the UK that is intended to help people with low incomes pay for rented accommodation. It is governed by various acts of Parliament - see, for example, The Social Security Contributions and Benefits Act 1992. Operationally, the governing Regulations are statutory instruments arising from that Act. It is governed by one of two sets of regulations. For working age claimants it is governed by the Housing Benefit Regulations 2006, but for those who have reached the qualifying age for Pension Credit, these are amended by The LHA and Information Sharing Regulations. The legislation to enable Local Housing Allowance was introduced under the Welfare Reform Act which received Royal Assent in May 2007. This provided for the national application of the LHA regime on 7 April 2008 and the introduction of the Employment Support Allowance, which replaced Incapacity Benefit.

The LHA system is a form of housing benefit administered, along with council tax benefit, by the local authority in whose area the property being rented lies. For those areas where there is two-tier local government Housing Benefit is administered by the district or borough council layer of local government.

The Local Housing Allowance itself is determined by a survey of rents within a given Broad Rent Market Area where the median, or 50th percentile, of rents is determined and it is this figure that is used to set the LHA, though since 2011 the Local Housing Allowance is based on the 30th percent of rents in an area.

Unlike the previous schemes, the claimant is normally unable to request that payments of benefits are made to their landlord, although they may be made to a third party. Exceptions may be made where the tenant has a history of not paying rent or is not sufficiently able to handle their affairs. Decisions on this are subject to a council operated safeguarding policy which may be requested from the local authority.

In all cases a landlord must be paid the rent (without any excess) if the tenant is more than 8 weeks in arrears. This will continue until the arrears are below 8 weeks.

LHA does not currently affect:

- council tenancies
- most tenancies with registered social landlords
- tenancies that started before 15 January 1989
- benefit claims that are treated as under the rules in operation prior to 2 January 1996 because of care, support, or supervision being provided by certain categories of not for profit landlord.

=== Concepts and terminology ===
- Broad Rental Market Areas - A BRMA is an area "within which a person could reasonably be expected to live having regard to facilities and services for the purposes of health, education, recreation, personal banking and shopping, taking account of the distance of travel by public and private transport, to and from facilities and services of the same type and similar standard". It must contain a variety of residential property types held a variety of tenancies. It must also contain 'distinct areas of residential accommodation'.

The BRMAs, which decide how much benefit can be paid, have been criticised by the House of Lords, in the Heffernan case (R (Heffernan) v The Rent Service [2008] UKHL 58) and by Shelter.

== Eligibility ==
Housing Benefit is available only to those who are treated as liable to pay rent, have permanent right to reside in the UK and pass the habitual residence test.

== Transition arrangements ==
In the main only new claims and tenants who move into a private assured shorthold tenancy will be paid Local Housing Allowance.

In the Pathfinder and Second Wave Group of Local Authorities (those detailed in the section above), any tenant who would have received less Housing Benefit under the LHA rules than under their previous scheme had their prior eligible rent protected until their LHA figure is higher than the benefit allowed under the previous scheme, after which time their eligible rent switches to that set under the LHA rules.

Initially, where the LHA amount was more than the actual rent paid, the claimant was permitted to keep any excess Housing Benefit paid over and above their rental liability. The rules have been amended for the national roll out of LHA so that claimants will only be awarded a maximum LHA of £15 per week over and above their actual rent if they find a property cheaper than their applicable LHA rate. Any existing claimant in the Pathfinder/Second Wave Group authorities who receives more than this amount under the existing rules will also have this extra protected for 52 weeks, after which time the £15 maximum excess will apply. As part of the 2009 Budget, the Secretary of State for Work and Pensions proposed to amend the Housing Benefit regulations from 5 April 2010 so that the up to £15 weekly excess that customers can receive over and above their contractual rent is removed. This will mean that no claimant can receive more in Housing Benefit than they actually pay out in rent. This proposal would remove the incentives for tenants to seek less-expensive accommodation which was one of the primary rationales for the roll-out of Local Housing Allowance. Coupled with the removal of the supervisory role formerly played by the local rent officer, this raises questions about the long-term sustainability of the programme.

Where the landlord is a not for profit company (or voluntary organisation), a Registered Social Landlord or a Local Council that provides care support or supervision, they will be exempt from Local Housing Allowance and will fall under the housing benefit rules in operation prior to 2 January 1996.

== Council and housing association tenants ==
The LHA does not currently apply to council tenants and most housing association tenants but, from April 2013, a reduction in eligible rent for those of working age under-occupying their home will apply. This will reduce the rent on which benefit is paid by 14% for those with one extra bedroom and 25% for those with two or more.

== Direct payments ==
LHA will only be paid directly to the landlord if there are exceptional reasons - e.g. if the tenant is unable to handle their financial affairs, has a bad history of paying landlords or is more than 8 weeks in arrears. If the tenant is in arrears by more than 8 weeks, benefit must be paid to the landlord.

== LHA Rates ==
The amount of LHA awarded depends on:

- the number of bedrooms deemed to be required by the claimant, and
- the region in which they live (called the Broad Rental Market Area) which determines the market level of rents within this area.
- the percentile chosen by LHA rules as applicable - currently this is set at the 30th percentile meaning the rate is set amongst the lower rental rates for a wide region that includes many towns. If the tenant lives in a town with a higher than average rent, the lower 30th percentile rent for the region as a whole is still applied. Or,
- the previous LHA amount for that area, whichever is lower (this will be the case in many areas due to a freeze in the LHA rates from April 2016). Or,
- the national maximum weekly rents, which for 2015 are:

– £260.64 for one room, shared accommodation
– £260.64 for one bedroom exclusive use
– £302.33 for 2 bedroom accommodation
– £354.46 for 3 bedroom accommodation
– £417.02 for 4 bedroom accommodation

=== Bedroom Requirement ===
Local Housing Allowance is calculated on the number of rooms the claimant's household needs not the number of rooms in the property or the amount of rent charged. The number of bedrooms needed is based on the number, age and sex of people who live in the claimant's household. The bedroom requirement is calculated as follows:

- one bedroom for the claimant and partner (over 16 - including same sex couples)
- one bedroom for other person aged 16 or over
- one bedroom for any two children of the same sex aged under 16
- one bedroom for any two children regardless of sex who are less than ten years old
- one bedroom for any other child

If the claimant is single and aged under 35, the category of property considered appropriate is a bedroom in shared accommodation. This means a property in which the claimant has the exclusive use of one bedroom, but shares one or more of a kitchen, a bathroom, a toilet or a room suitable for living in.

The maximum LHA rate covers a four bedroom property.

=== Rental Market Areas ===
The old way of setting fair rents for an area involved rent officers assessing each property, and a maximum Local Reference Rent set to reflect the maximum 'reasonable' rent for the area. Under LHA, Broad Rental Market Areas (BRMA) have been defined, and rent officers attempt to determine a median rent level which is intended to give Housing Benefit recipients access to roughly the cheapest 30% of the properties available to rent in any given region. This includes many towns.

For definition of Broad Rental Market Area, see Concepts and terminology section above.

The table below gives the weekly rates that applied from 1 April 2016 to 31 March 2017.

Due to the rates being frozen in 2016, in many areas the 30th percentile is now higher than the LHA rate. Key: the rates in the yellow cells are £10 or more per week less than the 30th percentile; in the light orange cells the difference is £20 or more per week; and in the orange cells the difference is £30 or more per week.

BRMA	Room	1 Bedroom	2 Bedrooms	3 Bedrooms	4 Bedrooms
Ashford	£67.10	£119.09	£145.43	£168.00	£223.63
Aylesbury	£72.76	£123.58	£153.02	£198.43	£291.34
Barnsley	£56.58	£72.72	£87.41	£99.79	£136.93
Barrow-in-Furness	£63.25	£78.00	£92.05	£110.47	£136.93
Basingstoke	£68.17	£134.02	£161.98	£192.28	£266.65
Bath	£72.49	£135.74	£167.23	£189.86	£291.90
Bedford	£62.18	£103.02	£133.32	£156.38	£209.07
Birmingham	£57.34	£98.87	£120.29	£132.00	£173.41
Black Country	£60.00	£86.30	£104.89	£120.29	£151.50
Blackwater Valley	£79.92	£141.24	£176.56	£210.70	£312.00
Bolton and Bury	£48.67	£84.00	£98.96	£114.84	£143.84
Bournemouth	£65.48	£123.58	£153.02	£188.79	£253.15
Bradford & South Dales	£58.26	£80.55	£97.81	£111.83	£123.58
Brighton and Hove	£82.66	£153.02	£192.48	£230.28	£339.36
Bristol	£67.37	£121.19	£151.50	£175.74	£242.33
Bury St Edmunds	£64.14	£102.25	£126.31	£150.36	£216.00
Cambridge	£80.52	£126.05	£140.74	£168.45	£218.16
Canterbury	£74.62	£123.86	£154.82	£180.45	£280.60
Central Greater Manchester	£67.20	£101.98	£119.98	£133.32	£186.47
Central Lancs	£53.67	£89.46	£109.32	£126.58	£161.10
Central London	£136.52	£260.64	£302.33	£354.46	£417.02
Central Norfolk & Norwich	£61.45	£92.98	£116.52	£135.36	£184.11
Chelmsford	£69.04	£126.00	£151.50	£185.29	£231.92
Cheltenham	£67.08	£111.83	£143.34	£174.43	£240.59
Cherwell Valley	£72.50	£126.27	£157.56	£187.87	£248.35
Chesterfield	£50.94	£80.55	£97.81	£113.92	£149.59
Chichester	£73.58	£134.02	£168.00	£198.11	£268.03
Chilterns	£73.64	£145.43	£182.45	£236.34	£344.05
Colchester	£64.78	£103.56	£132.32	£161.10	£204.49
Coventry	£65.65	£92.05	£111.48	£128.19	£170.67
Crawley & Reigate	£79.55	£151.50	£185.81	£222.54	£309.67
Darlington	£59.28	£75.00	£90.90	£107.11	£149.17
Derby	£58.82	£84.75	£103.56	£117.70	£149.59
Doncaster	£55.12	£78.08	£93.23	£103.56	£143.84
Dover-Shepway	£59.09	£86.30	£115.07	£143.84	£168.00
Durham	£63.50	£74.79	£86.30	£97.81	£138.08
East Cheshire	£70.90	£103.56	£130.03	£168.00	£249.60
East Lancs	£53.50	£80.03	£90.90	£103.56	£142.80
East Thames Valley	£75.51	£151.50	£193.92	£244.89	£334.43
Eastbourne	£67.00	£116.53	£151.50	£182.45	£235.34
Eastern Staffordshire	£60.04	£81.58	£103.56	£123.58	£162.40
Exeter	£74.34	£116.52	£141.24	£164.79	£218.63
Fylde Coast	£61.50	£85.00	£113.92	£130.00	£150.00
Gloucester	£68.18	£92.05	£122.36	£147.13	£187.14
Grantham & Newark	£59.04	£75.78	£99.06	£110.72	£156.00
Greater Liverpool	£57.77	£90.90	£104.60	£119.67	£156.00
Grimsby	£52.50	£75.00	£92.05	£99.04	£129.47
Guildford	£84.04	£170.67	£222.96	£268.03	£345.21
Halifax	£64.64	£80.55	£97.81	£115.07	£149.59
Harlow & Stortford	£68.08	£133.32	£164.79	£198.11	£279.69
Harrogate	£68.35	£110.72	£136.93	£161.10	£216.52
Herefordshire	£56.50	£92.05	£117.37	£135.19	£163.16
High Weald	£77.39	£135.36	£176.56	£223.19	£336.82
Hull & East Riding	£60.80	£69.73	£86.30	£103.56	£132.33
Huntingdon	£63.50	£104.89	£126.00	£150.40	£198.11
Inner East London	£102.09	£257.35	£302.33	£354.46	£417.02
Inner North London	£97.83	£260.64	£302.33	£354.46	£417.02
Inner South East London	£95.18	£204.08	£265.29	£330.72	£417.02
Inner South West London	£94.38	£253.82	£302.33	£354.46	£417.02
Inner West London	£110.54	£243.18	£302.33	£354.46	£417.02
Ipswich	£57.34	£90.64	£111.83	£129.47	£174.43
Isle of Wight	£68.50	£93.13	£121.97	£149.59	£184.11
Kendal	£62.50	£96.91	£123.58	£145.67	£174.81
Kernow West	£67.00	£104.89	£132.32	£151.50	£185.29
King's Lynn	£53.67	£90.64	£112.21	£129.47	£163.16
Kirklees	£55.00	£80.55	£96.91	£113.92	£149.59
Lancaster	£57.48	£90.90	£115.07	£132.32	£145.43
Leeds	£62.48	£100.05	£122.36	£151.50	£199.94
Leicester	£59.00	£86.30	£109.32	£126.58	£163.16
Lincoln	£58.90	£81.58	£100.22	£115.07	£148.01
Lincolnshire Fens	£58.38	£88.28	£110.67	£129.47	£153.02
Lowestoft & Great Yarmouth	£64.50	£86.23	£104.89	£117.70	£149.17
Luton	£62.44	£111.83	£142.44	£169.68	£204.49
Maidstone	£68.28	£123.58	£157.56	£180.45	£235.41
Medway & Swale	£65.66	£110.67	£138.08	£153.02	£198.11
Mendip	£69.08	£93.23	£123.58	£153.02	£184.11
Mid & East Devon	£66.70	£96.96	£126.31	£151.50	£192.28
Mid & West Dorset	£66.70	£105.94	£136.93	£161.10	£200.09
Mid Staffs	£66.70	£90.90	£113.92	£129.47	£170.67
Milton Keynes	£69.73	£121.19	£151.50	£174.81	£223.63
Newbury	£73.67	£123.58	£156.38	£188.33	£264.00
North Cheshire	£48.87	£92.05	£109.32	£126.58	£174.81
North Cornwall & Devon Borders	£66.70	£93.23	£120.06	£139.84	£168.00
North Cumbria	£58.90	£80.55	£94.36	£112.77	£141.24
North Devon	£63.25	£92.05	£115.07	£138.08	£168.46
North Nottingham	£58.41	£72.72	£92.98	£103.56	£145.43
North West Kent	£70.84	£124.69	£153.02	£174.43	£242.40
North West London	£87.40	£185.81	£242.33	£303.00	£374.40
Northampton	£66.32	£100.05	£126.31	£139.84	£187.14
Northants Central	£52.24	£82.40	£105.94	£123.58	£164.79
Northumberland	£65.65	£74.15	£87.45	£103.56	£138.08
Nottingham	£66.74	£90.90	£108.26	£120.29	£151.50
Oldham & Rochdale	£55.90	£83.91	£97.81	£113.92	£149.59
Outer East London	£76.56	£181.80	£229.58	£286.98	£331.61
Outer North East London	£75.15	£155.57	£192.62	£242.40	£312.77
Outer North London	£90.64	£199.68	£255.34	£315.12	£388.65
Outer South East London	£84.27	£161.02	£198.11	£242.40	£312.77
Outer South London	£82.46	£167.22	£210.57	£279.14	£344.38
Outer South West London	£84.91	£209.77	£280.60	£336.96	£417.02
Outer West London	£82.41	£175.74	£222.96	£272.50	£318.00
Oxford	£80.55	£158.90	£192.48	£230.14	£299.18
Peaks & Dales	£67.93	£90.21	£110.72	£128.19	£168.00
Peterborough	£57.15	£92.05	£115.07	£132.32	£168.41
Plymouth	£71.21	£94.16	£122.36	£145.43	£182.45
Portsmouth	£69.04	£116.53	£144.36	£172.60	£240.00
Reading	£78.78	£153.02	£188.33	£221.79	£315.12
Richmond & Hambleton	£68.35	£90.90	£113.92	£128.19	£161.10
Rotherham	£58.50	£79.40	£96.96	£101.00	£138.08
Rugby & East	£62.12	£92.06	£116.52	£134.02	£182.96
Salisbury	£67.84	£115.07	£143.84	£172.60	£228.99
Scarborough	£58.59	£80.55	£103.56	£124.77	£136.93
Scunthorpe	£53.50	£74.59	£92.05	£104.89	£134.02
Sheffield	£63.52	£94.80	£107.11	£116.53	£156.00
Shropshire	£68.81	£87.41	£109.32	£129.47	£170.67
Solihull	£69.05	£116.53	£149.59	£172.60	£230.14
South Cheshire	£54.60	£84.84	£109.32	£126.58	£172.60
South Devon	£63.50	£96.91	£128.19	£153.02	£192.24
South East Herts	£74.79	£146.57	£186.46	£230.28	£293.79
South West Essex	£63.50	£128.19	£161.26	£188.33	£266.65
South West Herts	£78.50	£156.00	£196.96	£240.00	£358.80
Southampton	£67.50	£116.53	£156.38	£184.49	£242.40
Southend	£66.78	£116.52	£151.50	£186.47	£240.00
Southern Greater Manchester	£57.84	£102.25	£128.19	£151.78	£200.09
Southport	£69.33	£91.43	£120.82	£139.84	£172.60
St Helens	£59.84	£80.55	£97.81	£113.92	£153.02
Staffordshire North	£52.02	£80.55	£90.90	£109.32	£139.84
Stevenage & North Herts	£72.04	£122.36	£155.37	£186.46	£238.80
Sunderland	£45.00	£88.00	£97.81	£109.32	£138.08
Sussex East	£69.77	£92.05	£120.29	£159.95	£195.62
Swindon	£60.04	£103.44	£127.51	£157.56	£198.11
Tameside & Glossop	£56.58	£86.30	£103.56	£126.58	£156.38
Taunton & West Somerset	£64.14	£92.05	£120.82	£145.67	£184.11
Teesside	£57.34	£83.78	£97.81	£114.00	£149.59
Thanet	£63.27	£80.73	£116.52	£144.36	£172.60
Tyneside	£60.00	£90.90	£103.56	£115.07	£149.59
Wakefield	£55.00	£86.30	£103.56	£113.92	£151.50
Walton	£84.84	£173.41	£221.72	£276.67	£382.64
Warwickshire South	£69.77	£119.09	£150.36	£181.80	£246.50
West Cheshire	£64.48	£99.06	£120.82	£138.08	£186.47
West Cumbria	£63.25	£79.24	£92.05	£104.89	£134.02
West Pennine	£62.40	£78.00	£85.00	£99.04	£137.31
West Wiltshire	£67.37	£100.05	£125.94	£156.00	£204.37
Weston-S-Mare	£66.50	£97.81	£122.36	£150.00	£184.11
Wigan	£57.57	£80.55	£96.23	£109.32	£149.59
Winchester	£75.19	£148.30	£182.45	£211.87	£312.77
Wirral	£60.99	£86.30	£103.56	£126.58	£140.62
Wolds and Coast	£64.67	£75.00	£93.23	£110.72	£128.47
Worcester North	£61.45	£92.05	£117.70	£133.32	£176.56
Worcester South	£70.32	£99.06	£128.19	£153.02	£188.33
Worthing	£69.19	£120.06	£153.02	£185.29	£246.00
Yeovil	£61.45	£92.05	£121.97	£145.67	£189.96
York	£67.09	£98.96	£123.58	£141.24	£200.09

== Appeals ==
All Housing Benefit decisions of a local authority are subject to appeal through the Tribunals Service. There is no direct right of appeal against the LHA rate awarded to an individual tenant, or the local rent level specified by the rent officer for the Broad Rental Market Areas. However, their decisions are open to judicial review and they have already been subject to challenge.

== Criticisms ==
Questions of fairness of the Local Housing Allowance system were raised when it was revealed in October 2008 that a family in the London Borough of Ealing was receiving £150,000 a year in Local Housing Allowance to rent a 7 bedroom property. As the Brown government acknowledged in the 2009 Budget, families on benefit might be significantly better off than low income families who are not eligible for housing benefits. "Indications [...] are that some claimants may be able to afford accommodation that is out of reach of working families on low incomes. Furthermore, costs of Housing Benefit have been rising above inflation despite static caseloads." The transition from the old housing benefit system to Local Housing Allowance significantly increased payments available for larger houses in some areas, as can be seen by comparing the Local Reference Rent calculated by the Valuation Office Agency, which served as the basis for determining the old housing benefit, against the current Local Housing Allowance. As an example, the Local Reference Rent for the largest type of house in the East Thames Valley locality in March 2009 was £328.85 per week, while the Local Housing Allowance for a similar property in the same area was £646.15 per week, an increase of £16,500 per year. However, the maximum that claimants can now claim Local Housing Allowance for under the coalition government is £400 a week, for a maximum of a four bedroom property. Regional variations also apply meaning that the maximum in areas with low rent prices LHA maximum will be much much lower than £400 a week.

A 2014 report examined the impacts of the changes to LHA rates introduced by the coalition government, in the context of London's higher housing costs. The study found that lowering LHA rates always makes a household worse off, as measured by its disposable income after working. Another criticism of lowering LHA rates is that they do nothing to improve the incentive to enter paid work. The report was commissioned by Shelter, published by New Policy Institute and funded by Trust for London.

== Disability issues ==
By definition, disabled people have needs that others do not. For example, a person might not be able to drive and therefore may not be able to live far away from active sections of the public transport network, where accommodation is cheaper. Few houses and maisonettes have lifts, which means that people who use mobility aids need ground floor accommodation; similarly those who use assistance dogs need a garden or yard where the animal can toilet. In contrast to the bottom 30%/30th percentile rent figure used in LHA, access to public transport, ground floor and garden accommodation has a premium. Disabled people therefore face the difficulty of finding accommodation with premium features at 'bottom 30%' prices. There are no exceptions for LHA rates for disabled people: one rule awards an additional LHA room allowance but only for people who can satisfy the requirement of needing overnight care once every fortnight. Someone who cannot drive, uses a wheelchair and needs an assistance dog might need access to public transport, a garden and ground floor accommodation, but their LHA rate is calculated just the same as a person who can drive, has no wheelchair or assistance animal. Consideration of proximity of carers, friends or relatives is also not a justifiable reason to live in a certain area, no matter how often a person might need assistance during the day.

== See also ==
- Housing Benefit
