= R (on the application of SG and others) v Secretary of State for Work and Pensions =

British legal case

- Court: Supreme Court of the United Kingdom
- Full case name: R (on the application of SG and others) v Secretary of State for Work and Pensions
- Neutral citation: [2015] UKSC 16

R (on the application of SG and others) v Secretary of State for Work and Pensions was a 2015 judgment by the Supreme Court of the United Kingdom where by a majority of 3–2 the court ruled that the benefit cap, a British government policy limiting welfare benefits, was legal. The benefit cap limits British social security benefits to £500 per week regardless of the number of children in a family and the level of local rents. The case was brought on behalf of two single mothers. One known as SG was the mother of six children the youngest of whom is four years old. The second mother known as NS had three children and had a marriage with a long history of sexual abuse and domestic violence. The Supreme Court did however rule that the cap breaches United Nations Convention on the Rights of the Child.

== Reaction ==
The judgement was criticised by the Child Poverty Action Group. Their chief executive Alison Garnham said:

As three of the judges have said it cannot be in the best interests of the children affected by the cap to deprive them of the means of having adequate food, clothing, warmth and housing. We hope the government will listen to the court and comply with international law on the protection of children.

== Questions of economic and political judgment ==
The Court was careful to make a distinction between review of a policy decision and review of the law - in that certain matters were better suited for determination by Government or Parliament than by the courts.

That consideration is relevant to these appeals, since the question of proportionality involves controversial issues of social and economic policy, with major implications for public expenditure. The determination of those issues is pre-eminently the function of democratically elected institutions. It is therefore necessary for the court to give due weight to the considered assessment made by those institutions. Unless manifestly without reasonable foundation, their assessment should be respected.

— Lord Reed of Allermuir)

== See also ==
- 2015 Judgments of the Supreme Court of the United Kingdom
