= Revolutionary People's Party =

The Revolutionary People's Party may refer to:

- Revolutionary People's Party (Turkey, illegal), DHP
- Revolutionary People's Party (Turkey, legal), DEV-PARTİ
