= 2014 United Kingdom budget =

- Presented: Wednesday 19 March 2014
- Country: United Kingdom
- Parliament: 55th
- Party: Coalition government
- Chancellor: George Osborne
- Total revenue: £648 billion ($1.1 trillion) (39% of 2014 GDP)
- Total expenditures: £732 billion ($1.2 trillion) (42% of 2014 GDP)
- Deficit: £84 billion (5% of 2014 GDP)
- Website: Budget 2014 documents

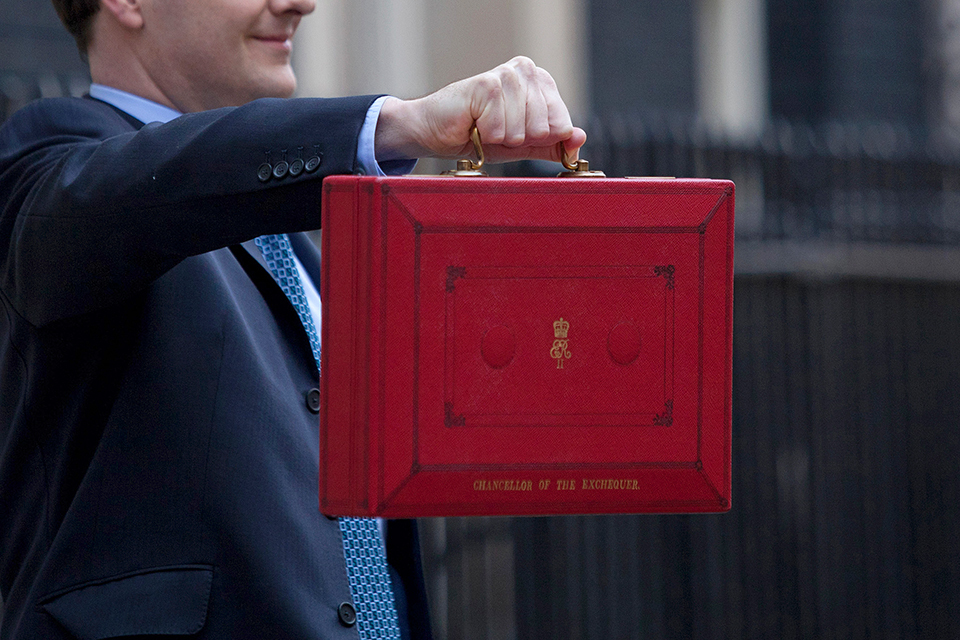
Chancellor George Osborne delivering his Budget Statement

The 2014 United Kingdom budget was delivered by George Osborne, the Chancellor of the Exchequer, to the House of Commons on Wednesday, 19 March 2014.

It was the fifth budget of the Conservative–Liberal Democrat coalition government formed following the 2010 general election, and also the fifth to be delivered by Osborne.

== Taxes ==
Receipts	2014-15 Revenues (£bn)
Income Tax	167
National Insurance	110
Value Added Tax (VAT)	111
Corporate Tax	41
Excise duties	47
Council Tax	27
Business rates	27
Other	118
Total Government revenue	648

== Spending ==
Department	2014-15 Expenditure (£bn)
Social protection	222
Health	140
Education	98
Debt interest	53
Defence	38
Public order and safety	32
Personal social services	31
Housing and Environment	25
Transport	23
Industry, agriculture and employment	17
Other	53
Total Government spending	732
