= Welfare Reform Act 2007 =

Act of the Parliament of the United Kingdom

Welfare Reform Act 2007 (Note: Section 71.)
- Act of Parliament
- Parliament of the United Kingdom
- Long title: An Act to make provision about social security; to amend the Vaccine Damage Payments Act 1979; and for connected purposes.
- Citation: 2007 c. 5
- Introduced by: John Hutton, Secretary of State for Work and Pensions (Commons); Lord McKenzie of Luton (Lords)
- Territorial extent: England and Wales; Scotland; Northern Ireland (in part); (Note: Section 69.)

Dates
- Royal assent: 3 May 2007
- Commencement: Various (Note: Section 70.)
Other legislation
Amends	Vaccine Damage Payments Act 1979; Legal Aid (Scotland) Act 1986; Social Security Contributions and Benefits Act 1992; Social Security Administration Act 1992; Social Security Administration (Northern Ireland) Act 1992; Jobseekers Act 1995; Employment Tribunals Act 1996; Education Act 1996; Immigration and Asylum Act 1999
Amended by	Child Maintenance and Other Payments Act 2008

Status: Amended

History of passage through Parliament

Text of statute as originally enacted

Revised text of statute as amended

The Welfare Reform Act 2007 (c. 5) is an act of the Parliament of the United Kingdom which alters the British social security system. A number of sections come into force two months after royal assent and the first commencement order made under the act specified that section 31 came into force on 1 November 2007.

== The green paper ==
The government's objectives for the act, as stated in the green paper were to:

- Reach 80% employment amongst all people of working age (it was just shy of 75% when the paper was released).
- To reduce the numbers claiming incapacity benefit by 1 million (from 2.7 million at the time). This was later stated to be achieved "within a decade"
- To help 300,000 lone parents back into work.
- To increase the number of older workers, aged fifty or over, in work by 1 million.

== Provisions, aims and criticisms of the Act ==
The Act is wide-ranging and affects a large swathe of the population, particularly those dependent on housing benefit and those suffering from physical and mental ill health and disability.

=== Changes to provision of Housing Benefit ===
The Local Housing Allowance method of assessing benefit will be applied across the de-regulated private rented sector nationwide.

Currently housing benefit is sent directly to landlords, not the tenants. The Act will change this so that rent money is paid to the tenant who will then be expected to pay this to the landlord. One of the stated motivations for this change is that it will give tenants an appreciation of the sums involved in their benefit claims and this will foster greater social responsibility. Criticism of this change has focused on vulnerable people such as drug addicted people (who may find the temptation of finding alternative uses for the money too great to withstand) and those with mental health problems (who may find the new responsibility difficult or impossible to fulfil).

The Act also introduces a housing benefit sanction for those who are found guilty of anti-social behaviour; benefit can be withdrawn and/or the tenants can be evicted.

=== Abolition of Incapacity Benefit ===
The act replaces Incapacity Benefit with a new benefit, Employment and Support Allowance. The new benefit will require that regular effort be made by (non-exempted) claimants to seek work or take part in work-related assessments and regularly meet with an advisor. Those failing to do so may see a reduction of their benefit.

The medicals carried out to see who is eligible for the benefit will be made more stringent.

Criticism of the changes has been broad. Charities working with vulnerable people have welcomed the Government's pledge to assist the disabled into work but are concerned that there is a lack of funding for this support and that, in the end, there will be more coercion than help. Critics are broadly in agreement that employers remain very wary of taking on disabled or mentally ill people and much more needs to be done to change this.

=== Older people and single mothers ===
The stated aims of the legislation were to increase the numbers of older people (50+) and single mothers in employment - two groups that face particular difficulties in returning to work.

== See also ==
- Welfare Reform Act
