= New Policy Institute =

British think tank

- Abbreviation: NPI
- Formation: December 1996; 29 years ago
- Founder: Guy Palmer; Peter Kenway
- Dissolved: September 2022; 3 years ago
- Type: Progressive think tank
- Location: London, United Kingdom
- Director: Dr Peter Kenway
- Website: npi.org.uk

The New Policy Institute (NPI) was a British think tank based in London. It was established in 1996, and closed in 2022. Its primary activity was producing research reports on issues such as poverty, housing, social security, and economics.

== History ==
The New Policy Institute was founded in 1996 by Guy Palmer, a management consultant, and Peter Kenway, an economist and planner. It had a mission of "advancing social justice in a market economy". It conducted research and consultancy work on poverty, social exclusion, welfare reform, labour markets, and macroeconomics. The NPI was independent, receiving most of its income from grants and commissions paid in return for research. It described its work as being grounded primarily in data analysis, though it also conducted data collection and qualitative research.

The NPI was noted for its close relationship with the Joseph Rowntree Foundation, having produced poverty profiles and quantitative assessments for the Foundation.

The think tank shut down in September 2022, stating that "As British politics polarised in the aftermath of the 2015 general election, the conditions that had allowed NPI to flourish began to disappear".

== Work ==
The New Policy Institute produced regular monitoring reports on poverty and social exclusion for the Joseph Rowntree Foundation and for the Trust for London.

The NPI produced research on the state of the water industry, commissioned by the trade union UNISON, which used it to call for a national inquiry into the industry.

In 2018, the NPI and Trust for London carried out a joint study which found that the London Borough of Harrow had one of the poorest records on affordable housing. The study found that Harrow had seen a reduction of 102 affordable homes between 2013/14 and 2015/16, with many demolished or converted into other forms of accommodation.

== See also ==
- List of think tanks in the United Kingdom
