= Discretionary Housing Payment =

UK discretionary housing-cost benefit

A Discretionary Housing Payment is an optional and short-term payment made in the United Kingdom that helps people with their housing costs. To get a Discretionary Housing Payment a person must be in receipt of Housing Benefit or Universal Credit. Application to the Local Authority is required. Central-government regulations and guidance require each Local Authority to make decisions on a case-by-case policy basis.

A similar Exceptional Hardship Payment exists.
