= Housing Benefit =

UK social security benefit

Housing Benefit is a means-tested social security benefit in the United Kingdom that is intended to help meet housing costs for rented accommodation. It is the second biggest item in the Department for Work and Pensions' budget after the state pension, totalling £23.8 billion in 2013–14.

The primary legislation governing Housing Benefit is the Social Security Contributions and Benefits Act 1992. Operationally, the governing regulations are statutory instruments arising from that Act. It is governed by one of two sets of regulations.

For working age claimants it is governed by the "Housing Benefit Regulations 2006", but for those who have reached the qualifying age for Pension Credit (regardless of whether it has been claimed) it is governed by the "Housing Benefit (Persons who have attained the qualifying age for state pension credit) Regulations 2006".

It is normally administered by the local authority in whose area the property being rented lies. In some circumstances, normally council tenants in "out of borough properties", some claimants may be required to obtain Housing Benefit from the borough that placed them. For those areas where there are two or more tier local government structure, Housing Benefit is administered by the district or borough council layer of local government. This is the council responsible for the billing of Council Tax. Additionally, local authorities in Great Britain, but not Northern Ireland, may contract out the administration of housing benefit to other local authorities, or to private companies.

Council tenants' housing benefit is awarded as a rebate, reducing the level of rent payable by the tenant. Private tenants' benefit is normally paid to the tenant, who has the right to decide to whom payments are made, but in other cases it is paid to the landlord. Local authorities reclaim the housing benefit that they have paid from the Department for Work and Pensions (DWP) by means of submitting heavily audited subsidy claims. Three subsidy claims must be completed each year: an initial estimate, a mid year estimate and a final claim. The final claim must be submitted to the DWP by 30 April. The final audited claim must be submitted by 30 November.

The Department for Work and Pensions pays local councils an administration grant based on the numbers of new claims and overall case-load; as well as various other cost factor adjustments to take into account the relative staff and accommodation costs. The level of Administration Grant awarded is announced annually by the Department for Work and Pensions. Some elements of the subsidy claim are subject to penalty, to encourage local authorities to control that element of expenditure. This includes high rents for care and support homes and the raising of overpayments. Overpayments of benefit are not fully funded in order to ensure that the local authority takes recovery action where appropriate.

From April 2017 people between the ages of 18 and 21 will not ordinarily be entitled to housing benefit. There are fears this will increase homelessness.

The Government made changes in 2022 to the way benefits are paid. Housing benefit for private and social tenants is no longer being dealt with by councils but is part of Universal Credit.

== History ==
Housing benefit was transferred from the Department of Health and Social Security (DHSS) to local authorities in 1983. This was to coincide with increasing deregulation of the private sector rental market as it was felt at the time that local authorities would have a better understanding of local rental market conditions than the DHSS. Its full transfer took place in 1989 as part of a major reform of social security legislation which also saw the introduction of Income Support.

== Benefit cap ==
Due to a benefit cap many claimants have had their housing benefit reduced to 50p a week, as they are receiving £23,000 in London or £20,000 in the rest of the country in other benefits.

In 2017, new building providing supported housing for vulnerable people is being cut due to uncertainty whether prospective tenants will be able to pay the rent. Schemes affected include homes for war veterans, for people with learning disabilities helping them live independently. New schemes are postponed or cancelled and existing schemes are being closed. David Orr of the National Housing Federation said, "With social care in crisis, the role supported housing plays in alleviating pressures on the NHS is ever more important. These changes have not even come in yet and they have taken 7,000 homes for vulnerable people out of the pipeline. The proposed changes in funding bear no relation to the real cost of providing this type of housing. It is time government put supported housing on a secure and sustainable footing". The most vulnerable people, elderly people, severely disabled people and people with mental health problems need a great deal of support and the benefit cap disproportionately prevents them from getting what they need. Single parent families comprise more than 70% of the households which got their housing benefit capped, and the Institute for Fiscal Studies reckoned that out-of-work single parents lost more than £3,000 annually since 2015. Polly Neate of Shelter said, "The money put forward [by the government for social housing] is only a fraction of what’s needed, given just how bad this crisis has become. Building new homes also takes time, and time is not on the side of the million private renters who could risk being tipped into homelessness by the freeze on housing benefit. Whether a struggling family or a young person in low-paid work, the freeze is stripping away the help people desperately need to pay their rent. (...) We are urging the government to abandon the freeze on housing benefit in the autumn budget or risk making more people homeless".

== Benefit freeze ==
The Joseph Rowntree Foundation (JRF) stated that in 2018 one in six pensioners was in poverty due to falling home ownership, rising rents and the benefits freeze. It is feared many pensioners will have to choose to pay for heating or buy food this winter not having enough money to get both. This is because benefits are frozen below inflation for the third consecutive year. Pensioner poverty had halved during 20 years, but started to rise in 2012–13. In 2016–17, 16% of pensioners were in poverty, reaching 31% for those in social housing and 36% for private renters. Campbell Robb of the Joseph Rowntree Foundation said, "For middle-aged people who have been struggling over the past few years, who don’t have many savings and don’t own their own home, the prospect of being a pensioner is very challenging". Roughly 20% of pensioners rent their home, and the proportion is rising. The benefits freeze since 2016 increases to the problem. Robb added, "As rent goes up faster than housing benefit, pensioners have a huge gap to fill. This tips people into poverty, and forces them to choose between food and heating". The JRF urged the government to end the benefits freeze and build really affordable housing. Robb further stated "These figures are part of a wider increase in poverty across all age-groups. If we don’t tackle the causes now, we fear that we are going to see poverty – particularly among pensioners – rise even more".

Due to the freeze housing benefit no longer covers rent and low income people risk being forced into poverty and homelessness. Matt Downie of Crisis stated,: 'This (Chartered Institute of Housing) report highlights just how much housing benefits for private renters are falling short of the levels needed, leaving many homeless people stuck in a desperate situation and putting yet more people at risk of homelessness.

== Northern Ireland ==
In Northern Ireland, tenants must apply to the Northern Ireland Housing Executive regardless of whether they rent from a private landlord, from the NIHE itself, or from a housing association.

== Pre-tenancy determinations ==
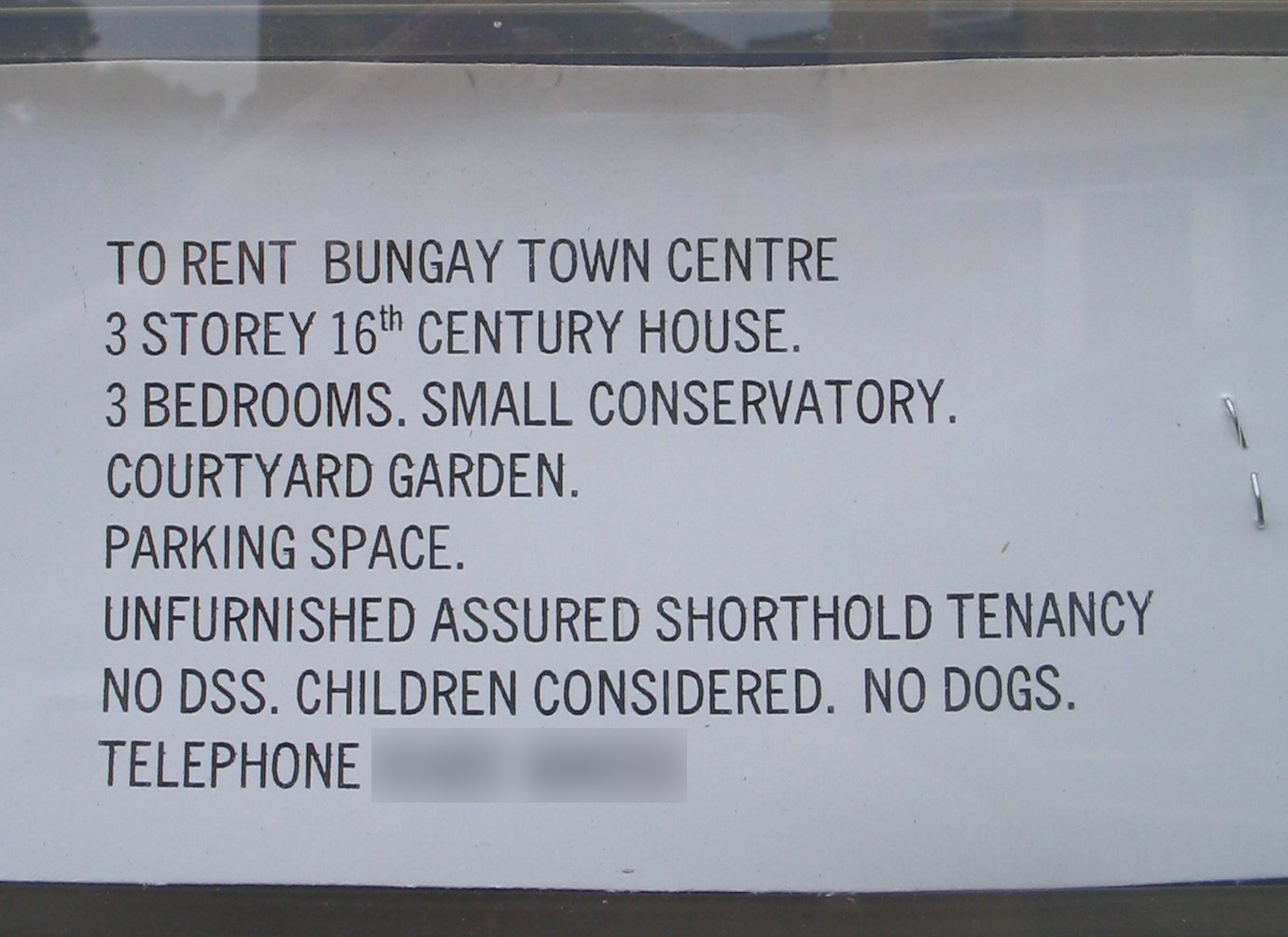
No DSS. Advertisement for a house in Bungay, Suffolk. Some private landlords will not rent property to claimants.

Before the introduction of the Local Housing Allowance the only way of finding out whether the benefit for the property would be restricted would have been to obtain a Pre Tenancy Determination. These had to be requested through the local authority and The Rent Service decision was treated by the Local Authority in the same way as any other referral to the Rent Service. Requests needed to be made by a prospective tenant and the landlord of the property. If the circumstances of the individual claimant were broadly the same as that of the prospective tenant who made the request for the PTD the decision remained valid for a year.

=== Delays in processing leading to "No-DSS" ===
Many larger councils suffered from delays in processing Housing Benefit claims. Delays of up to a year were reported. Delays and rent restrictions were so endemic in the system that it became common to see classified advertisements for lettings stating No DSS (the then-Department of Social Security, now called the Department for Work and Pensions (DWP)). It usually meant that the landlord was not willing to consider letting to a tenant who would be dependent on housing benefit to pay the rent.

Performance of councils has improved after millions of pounds in public money were poured in to support the worst-performing councils. The DWP requires councils to process claims within an average of thirty days from receipt to payment. Changes in the circumstances of claimants must be decided on within a target of twelve days. After a review of performance indicators, the DWP combined these targets into one indicator – the right time indicator.

Very few councils are now reporting backlogs, although the recession has seen an increase in case-load which has resulted in the Government granting Local Authorities an additional £45 million for 2009/10 in order to ensure continued good performance.

In practice, lettings agencies will usually obtain credit references on prospective tenants and, once the tenants have moved in, they are ambivalent as to whether tenants claim housing benefit or not, as long as the rent is paid on time.

Local Housing Allowance is designed to ensure that landlords do not have a reason to discriminate against tenants on Housing Benefit, as in most cases there will be no need for a landlord to know that the tenant is on Housing Benefit, and the tenant can know in advance if rent will be met in full.

Some landlord organisations have raised concerns about Local Housing Allowance as they believe it has made rents more difficult to collect from those on Housing Benefit.

== Appeals ==
The Housing Benefit (Decision and Appeals) Regulations 2001 state that any 'person affected' by a relevant decision can ask the council to revise its decision (Look at the decision again). It also states that a person affected can appeal against the decision of a Local Authority to an independent appeal tribunal (the First-tier Tribunal) within one calendar month.

This means that every time a decision is made about Housing benefit a Decision notice must be sent, notifying the 'person affected' of the amount of Housing and Council Tax Benefit awarded, overpayments/underpayments, and terminations.

== Discretionary housing payments ==
Discretionary housing payments are available to those who need further help to meet their Housing costs. To be eligible to claim for a DHP one must qualify for Housing or Council Tax Benefit (at any rate). The funds for DHPs are cash limited. The DWP publishes how much is available to for DHP funding to Local Authorities each year.

== Changes to housing benefit in 2011 ==
In the spending review of 20 October 2010 George Osborne announced a series of changes to housing benefit. From April 2011 claimants will only be able to claim a rent based on the 30th percentile of rent in their area (previously 50th percentile). The age at which most single people can claim for a self-contained one bedroom flat (rather than the shared room rate) was increased to 35 years. Exceptions to this apply to some groups, including care leavers aged under 22, some people who have a disability and over 25s who have spent at least three months living in hostel accommodation, subject to meeting further conditions. The maximum payable under LHA was also set to £400 per week, or £20,800 per annum.

These changes will mean significantly lower amounts of benefit will be paid, especially in Central London. Transitional protection will apply to existing claimants, their eligible rent will be reduced based on the anniversary date of when they first made their claim for benefit. The government has stated that the purpose of these reductions is to reduce the fiscal deficit and to increase the incentive for people to work. The reduction in benefits will mean that some families will have to leave their existing homes and find cheaper ones.

Families of people in work have been unable to pay their rent and have become homeless through the housing benefit freeze. The cost of maintaining these families in bed and breakfast accommodation is far higher than the cost of paying the families a higher rate of housing benefit would be. Roger Harding of Shelter stated, "We have grave concerns that the current freeze on housing benefit is pushing hundreds of thousands of private renters perilously close to breaking point at a time when homelessness is rising. For those hit by the freeze, housing benefit is failing to bridge the widening gap between escalating private rents and incomes that simply can’t keep up. (...) We’re calling on the government to abandon the freeze in the short term or risk making more people homeless. Ultimately, if the government wants to cut the welfare bill in the long term, they should concentrate their efforts on building genuinely affordable homes that low earners can actually afford".

Housing benefit has been frozen for four years to 2018 while private sector rents have been rising. This has caused hardship among poorer tenants who do not have enough money to heat their homes, to buy food and also to pay their rent, the Chartered Institute of Housing has found. Terrie Alafat of the CIH said, "Our research makes it clear just how far housing benefit for private renters has failed to keep pace with even the cheapest private rents. We fear this policy is putting thousands of private renters on low incomes at risk of poverty and homelessness". Over 90% of Local Housing Allowance rates throughout the UK now do not cover the cheapest 30% of homes in any area, as they were originally intended to do, the Chartered Institute of Housing research shows. In November 2017 over 30 homeless charities, faith leaders and MPs issued a letter to Chancellor Philip Hammond, urging him to lift housing benefit cap or a million households would face homelessness in the coming two years. Single people under 25 years old are specially vulnerable as they are only entitled to housing benefit covering a bedroom in a shared household and other benefits they can claim are lower. Matt Downie of the housing charity Crisis said, "This report highlights just how much housing benefits for private renters are falling short of the levels needed, leaving many homeless people stuck in a desperate situation and putting yet more people at risk of homelessness".

== Commercial exploitation ==
In October 2022, Home REIT was established to invest in properties occupied by tenants who qualify for Housing Benefit payments. On 7 December 2022, a group of shareholders claimed the company had misled the market by investing in properties occupied by tenants who are not vulnerable and therefore would not qualify for Housing Benefit payments. The company denied the allegations.

== See also ==
- Right to housing
- Section 8 (housing) – analogous U.S. program
- Low-Income Housing Tax Credit – U.S. housing subsidy program for new construction and rehab.
