= SMP =

SMP may refer to:

== Organisations ==
- Scale Model Products, 1950s, acquired by Aluminum Model Toys
- School Mathematics Project, UK developer of mathematics textbooks
- Sekolah Menengah Pertama, "junior high school" in Indonesia
- Shanghai Municipal Police, until 1943
- Sipah-e-Muhammad Pakistan, Pakistani group banned as terrorist
- Post-nominal letters of Roman Catholic order Sisters of Mary of the Presentation
- Standard Motor Products (NYSE: SMP), US automotive product company
- Suomen maaseudun puolue, the Finnish Rural Party, 1959-2003

== Science and technology ==
- Shape-memory polymer, smart materials
- Signal Message Processor, for the Multifunctional Information Distribution System
- Silyl modified polymers, used in adhesives and sealants
- Simulation Model Portability, SMP2, European space mission simulator standard
- Slow-moving proteinase, the enzyme Cathepsin E
- Socialist millionaire problem in cryptography
- Sorbitan monopalmitate, a food additive
- SOTA Mapping Project, a website for radio amateurs
- Stable marriage problem in mathematics
- Stable massive particle in physics, e.g the MoEDAL experiment
- Surface-mount package, for electronic components

=== Computing ===
- Serial Management Protocol for Serial attached SCSI (SAS)
- System Modification Program, IBM mainframe software
- SMP/E (System Modification Program/Extended), IBM mainframe software
- Supplementary Multilingual Plane, Unicode characters for historical scripts
- SMP (computer algebra system)
- Symmetric multiprocessing
- Security Manager Protocol used in Bluetooth Low Energy
- SimpleX Messaging Protocol, a privacy focused messaging protocol. See it in the Comparison of instant messaging protocols

== Entertainment ==
- SMP (band)
- Survival Multiplayer, a common Minecraft server gamemode
- Super Mario Party, a 2018 video game released on the Nintendo Switch

== Other uses ==
- Securities Markets Program of the European Central Bank
- Statutory Maternity Pay in the UK
- Sau Mau Ping station, Hong Kong
- Scalp micropigmentation
- SHOKUGAN MODELING PROJECT, a Japanese plastic model kit series released by Bandai
- Single-member plurality voting
- Sydney Motorsport Park, a motorsport facility located in Australia
- SMP Racing, a Russian auto racing team
