= United Kingdom legislation connected with the COVID-19 pandemic =

Primary and secondary legislation from 2020

This article contains a list of primary and secondary legislation enacted by the Parliament of the United Kingdom, the Scottish Parliament, the Senedd and the Northern Ireland Assembly in connection with the COVID-19 pandemic.

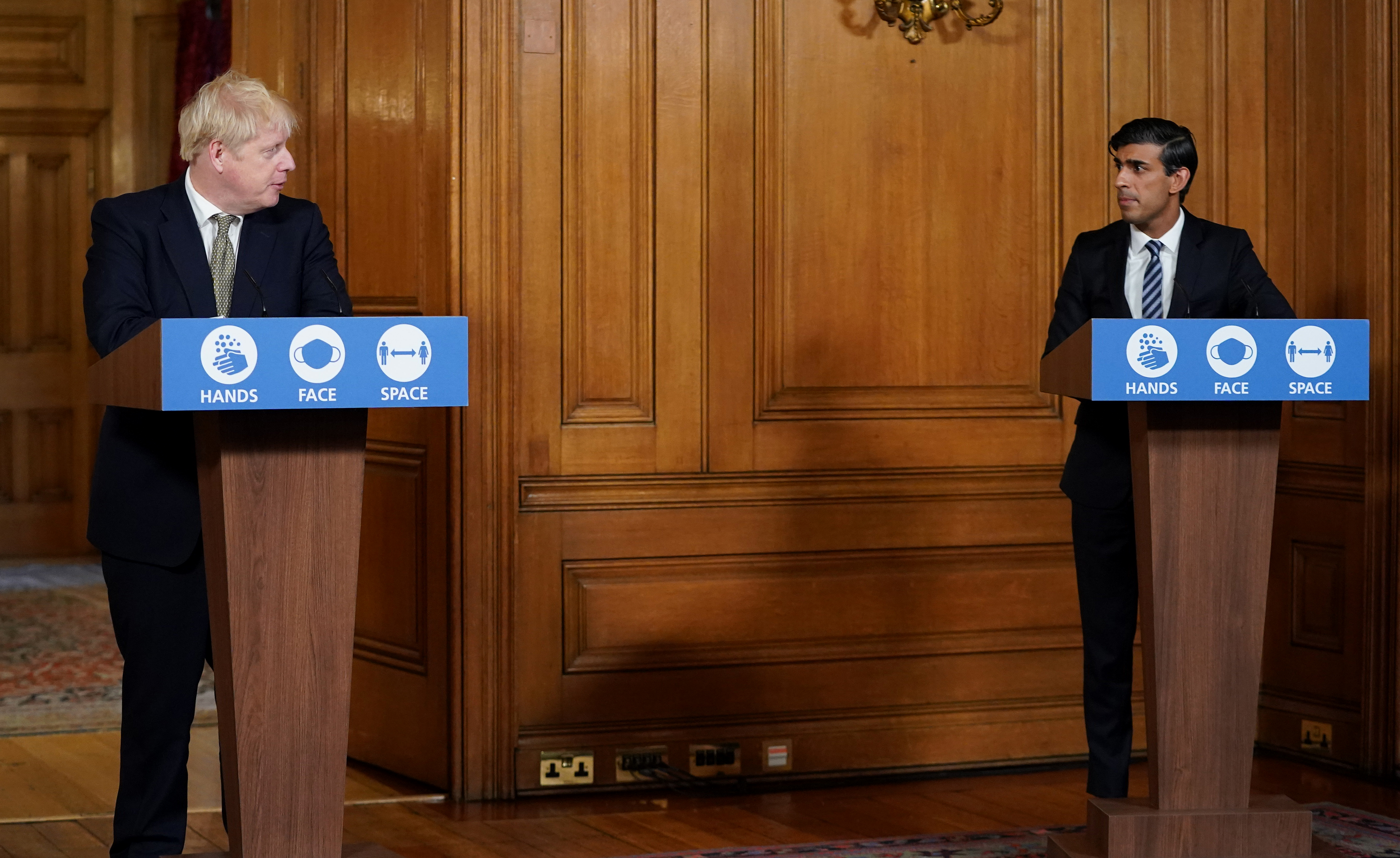
Prime Minister Boris Johnson delivers a press conference on 22 October 2020 with Chancellor of the Exchequer Rishi Sunak. The "Hands, Face, Space" slogan is displayed on their podiums

== Primary legislation ==
As of 9 August 2020

Act	Chapter	Royal Assent	Detail
Contingencies Fund Act 2020	2020 c. 6	25 March 2020	To increase the maximum capital of the United Kingdom's contingency fund in response to the COVID-19 pandemic.
Coronavirus Act 2020	2020 c. 7	25 March 2020	To grant a range of emergency powers in connection with the COVID-19 pandemic.
Coronavirus (Scotland) Act 2020	2020 asp 7	6 April 2020	To grant a range of emergency powers in connection with the COVID-19 pandemic.
Coronavirus (Scotland) (No. 2) Act 2020	2020 asp 10	26 May 2020	To grant a range of emergency powers in connection with the COVID-19 pandemic.
Corporate Insolvency and Governance Act 2020	2020 c.12	25 June 2020	To provide for changes to corporate insolvency procedures in the UK and to relax certain company law regulations.
Stamp Duty Land Tax (Temporary Relief) Act 2020	2020 c. 15	22 July 2020	To temporarily cut Stamp Duty Land Tax on residential properties to stimulate the housing market.
Business and Planning Act 2020	2020 c. 16	22 July 2020	To provide for a range of measures to assist businesses operating during the pandemic. Primarily to facilitate the Bounce Back Loan scheme, make changes to licensing laws, modifications to planning legislation and relaxations of vehicle licensing rules.
Welsh Elections (Coronavirus) Act 2021	2021 asc 2	16 March 2021	To provide for a range of measures for the 2021 Senedd Election.
Scottish General Election (Coronavirus) Act 2021	2021 asp 5	29 January 2021	To provide for a range of measures for the 2021 Scottish Parliament Election.
Coronavirus (Extension and Expiry) (Scotland) Act 2021	2021 asp 19	4 August 2021	To extending the Coronavirus (Scotland) Act 2020 and the Coronavirus (Scotland) (No. 2) Act 2020.
Rating (Coronavirus) and Directors Disqualification (Dissolved Companies) Act 2021	2021 c. 34	15 December 2021	To clarify circumstances in which the impacts of the Covid-19 pandemic can and cannot be considered when deciding on the rateable value of a property on the 2017 rating list; and making it easier to investigate the conduct of directors of companies that have been dissolved.
Coronavirus (Discretionary Compensation for Self-isolation) (Scotland) Act 2022	2022 asp 2	23 March 2022	To make compensation for self-isolation by health boards up to the discretion by the health board, rather than mandatory.
Commercial Rent (Coronavirus) Act 2022	2022 c. 12	24 March 2022	Establishing a new binding arbitration process to help landlords and tenants agree a resolution of Covid-related rent debts.
Non-domestic Rates Valuations (Coronavirus) Act (Northern Ireland) 2022	2022 c. 12 (N.I.)	30 March 2022	
Non-Domestic Rates (Coronavirus) (Scotland) Act 2022	2022 asp 7	28 July 2022	To delay business rates, and applying full business rates to private schools.
Coronavirus (Recovery and Reform) (Scotland) Act 2022	2022 asp 8	10 August 2022	To extend emergency powers granted during the Covid pandemic required landlords to seek approval for evictions from a tribunal

== Secondary legislation in England ==
As of 18 January 2021

Regulation	SI Number	Date laid before Parliament	Detail
National Health Service (Charges to Overseas Visitors) (Amendment) Regulations 2020	2020 No.59	28 January 2020	Designates the Coronavirus disease 2019 as a disease for which no charge is to be made for treatment for overseas visitors.
Health Protection (Coronavirus) Regulations 2020	2020 No.129	10 February 2020	Enables a number of public health measures to be taken to reduce the potential public health risks that might arise from COVID-19.
Health Protection (Notification) (Amendment) Regulations 2020	2020 No.237	6 March 2020	Designates COVID-19 as a notifiable disease under the Public Health (Control of Disease) Act 1984 and the Health Protection (Notification) Regulations 2010.
Employment and Support Allowance and Universal Credit (Coronavirus Disease) Regulations 2020	2020 No.289	12 March 2020	To provide additional support for individuals claiming employment and support allowance or universal credit and to remove the need for face to face contact where individuals are self-isolating.
Statutory Sick Pay (General) (Coronavirus Amendment) Regulations 2020	2020 No.287	12 March 2020	To treat any person who is self-isolating as a result of COVID-19 as being incapable of working and eligible for Statutory Sick Pay.
Statutory Sick Pay (General) (Coronavirus Amendment) (No. 2) Regulations 2020	2020 No.304	16 March 2020	To treat any person who is isolating themselves from others in accordance with guidance published on 12 March 2020 as being incapable of working and eligible for statutory sick pay.
Single Use Carrier Bags Charges (England) (Amendment) Order 2020	2020 No.324	20 March 2020	To remove the requirement to charge for single use carrier bags in respect of bags intended to be used to carry goods purchased for home delivery as part of an online grocery delivery service.
Financial Services and Markets Act 2000 (Exemption) (Amendment) Order 2020	2020 No.322	20 March 2020	The COVID Corporate Financing Facility was exempted from the general prohibition for persons to carry out regulated activities under the Financial Services and Markets Act 2000.
Health Protection (Coronavirus, Business Closure) (England) Regulations 2020	2020 No.327	23 March 2020	Provided for the closure of in England of businesses selling food and drink for consumption on the premises, as well as a range of other businesses such as nightclubs and indoor leisure centres where a high risk of infection could be expected.
Town and Country Planning (General Permitted Development) (England) (Amendment) Order 2020	2020 No.330	23 March 2020	Provided for pubs, cafes and restaurants to act as takeaways for a temporary period.
Health Protection (Coronavirus, Restrictions) (England) Regulations 2020	2020 No.350	26 March 2020	Provided for an extensive lockdown of businesses in England and for restrictions on the movement of people other than where there was a reasonable excuse.
National Health Service (Amendments Relating to the Provision of Primary Care Services During a Pandemic etc.) Regulations 2020	2020 No.351	26 March 2020	Various measures to prioritise the delivery of particular NHS services, to provide for greater flexibility in the opening hours and operations of GP practices and pharmacies.
Street and Road Works (Amendments Relating to Electronic Communications) (England) (Amendment) Regulations 2020	2020 No.346	26 March 2020	To delay the date on which the Street and Road Works (Amendments Relating to Electronic Communications) (England) Regulations 2020 (SI 2020/122) come into effect by three months to help deal with the impact of COVID-19.
Occupational and Personal Pension Schemes (General Levy) (Revocation) Regulations 2020	2020 No.355	27 March 2020	To revoke the increase in the general levy for pensions schemes due to the significant uncertainty of the COVID-19 pandemic on business.
Police Act 1997 (Criminal Records) (Amendment) Regulations 2020	2020 No.359	27 March 2020	To remove the charge for obtaining a criminal record certificate for retired health and social care practitioners who were being requested to return to work to help deal with the COVID-19 pandemic.
Investigatory Powers (Temporary Judicial Commissioners and Modification of Time Limits) Regulations 2020	2020 No.360	27 March 2020	To allow the Investigatory Powers Commissioner to appoint temporary Judicial Commissioners which would not normally be available under the Investigatory Powers Act 2016 to alleviate the strain placed by COVID-19 on the warrantry process.
Working Time (Coronavirus) (Amendment) Regulations 2020	2020 No.365	27 March 2020	To amend the Working Time Regulations 1998 (SI 1998/1833) to ensure that workers for whom it is not reasonably practicable to take holidays due to the pandemic can carry their holiday into the following two years.
Statutory Sick Pay (Coronavirus) (Suspension of Waiting Days and General Amendment) Regulations 2020	2020 No.374	27 March 2020	To suspend the rule which would ordinarily prevent Statutory Sick Pay for the first three qualifying days of incapacity to ensure that statutory sick pay can be paid from the first day of absence and treats any person staying at home due to COVID-19 (or members of their household) as being incapable of work.
Competition Act 1998 (Health Services for Patients in England) (Coronavirus) (Public Policy Exclusion) Order 2020	2020 No.368	27 March 2020	To exclude certain agreements between healthcare providers and between healthcare providers and the NHS from the prohibition on anti-competitive behaviour under the Competition Act 1998.
Competition Act 1998 (Groceries) (Coronavirus) (Public Policy Exclusion) Order 2020	2020 No.369	27 March 2020	To exclude certain agreements between grocery stores (primarily supermarkets) and associated suppliers from the prohibition on anti-competitive behaviour under the Competition Act 1998.
Competition Act 1998 (Solent Maritime Crossings) (Coronavirus) (Public Policy Exclusion) Order 2020	2020 No.370	27 March 2020	To exclude certain agreements between operators of ferries across the Solent between England and the Isle of Wight from the prohibition on anti-competitive behaviour under the Competition Act 1998.
Social Security (Coronavirus) (Further Measures) Regulations 2020	2020 No.371	27 March 2020	To provide for a temporary increase in the Universal Credit standard allowances, relax the application of the minimum income floor for self-employed universal credit claimants, increase local housing authority rates for private renters claiming housing benefits, disapplying the requirement to actively seek work to obtain jobseeker's allowance and others.
Nursing and Midwifery Council (Emergency Procedures) (Amendment) Rules 2020 Order of Council 2020	2020 No.364	30 March 2020	To allow the Nursing and Midwifery Council to amend its rules on lapse of registration and fitness to practice in order to ensure that processes can continue during the pandemic.
Feed-in Tariffs (Amendment) (Coronavirus) Order 2020	2020 No.375	30 March 2020	To provide for additional time for small-scale renewable electricity generation to apply for accreditation under the feed-in tariffs scheme.
Motor Vehicles (Tests) (Amendment) (Coronavirus) Regulations 2020	2020 No.382	30 March 2020	To exclude cars, light commercial vehicles and motor cycles from the requirement to obtain a MOT test and hold a test certificate for one of period of six months.
Coronavirus (Retention of Fingerprints and DNA Profiles in the Interests of National Security) Regulations 2020	2020 No.391	1 April 2020	In accordance with provisions set out in the Coronavirus Act 2020, powers were exercised by the Secretary of State to extend the deadline for the retention of fingerprints and DNA profiles for a period of up to six months.
Local Authorities and Police and Crime Panels (Coronavirus) (Flexibility of Local Authority and Police and Crime Panel Meetings) (England and Wales) Regulations 2020	2020 No.392	2 April 2020	To enable local authorities and police and crime panels to hold meetings remotely.
Social Security (Coronavirus) (Further Measures) Amendment Regulations 2020	2020 No.397	3 April 2020	To provide that the start date for the temporary increase in universal credit and increase to local housing allowance originally included in the Social Security (Coronavirus) (Further Measures) Regulations 2020 (SI 2020/371) will be brought forward to 6 April 2020.
Local Government and Police and Crime Commissioner (Coronavirus) (Postponement of Elections and Referendums) (England and Wales) Regulations 2020	2020 No.395	6 April 2020	To postpone local elections that were scheduled to take place between 15 March 2020 and 5 May 2021 until 6 May 2021.
Prison and Young Offender Institution (Coronavirus) (Amendment) Rules 2020	2020 No.400	6 April 2020	To make changes to the Prison Rules 1999 (SI 1999/728) to all for the release of certain prisoners temporarily to help manage the incidence or transmission of coronavirus.
Offender Management Act 2007 (Coronavirus) (Approved Premises) (Amendment) Regulations 2020	2020 No.401	6 April 2020	To allow for prisoners released under the Prison and Young Offender Institution (Coronavirus) (Amendment) Rules 2020 (SI 2020/400) to be accommodated in approved premises.
Accounts and Audit (Coronavirus) (Amendment) Regulations 2020	2020 No.404	7 April 2020	To amend the Accounts and Audit Regulations 2015 (SI 2015/234) by delaying the dates on which certain public and local bodies must publish annual accounts to 30 November 2020.
Social Fund Funeral Expenses Payment (Coronavirus) (Amendment) Regulations 2020	2020 No.405	7 April 2020	To increase the payments from the Social Fund to eligible claimants for arranging a funeral from £700 to £1,000.
Social Security (Coronavirus) (Prisoners) Regulations 2020	2020 No.409	7 April 2020	To provide access to means-tested benefits for individuals on temporary release from a prison in England and Wales due to the COVID-19 pandemic.
National Health Service (Performers Lists) (England) (Coronavirus) (Amendment) Regulations 2020	2020 No.411	8 April 2020	To allow doctors who are not general practitioners to provide primary care where they are employed or registered with certain designated bodies.
Town and Country Planning (General Permitted Development) (Coronavirus) (England) (Amendment) Order 2020	2020 No.412	8 April 2020	To create a new permitted development right to allow local authorities and health service bodies to carry out developments which are required to respond to the spread of coronavirus without a requirement to submit a planning application.
Employment Appeal Tribunal (Coronavirus) (Amendment) Rules 2020	2020 No.415	9 April 2020	To amend the Employment Appeal Tribunal Rules 1993 (SI 1993/2854) to allow for a hearing before the Employment Appeal Tribunal to be conducted by means of electronic communication.
Tribunal Procedure (Coronavirus) (Amendment) Rules 2020	2020. No.416	9 April 2020	To amend various tribunal procedures to allow for the first-tier tribunal and the upper tribunal to conduct remote hearings and for these remote hearings to be held in private if it is not practicable for the hearing to be broadcast.
Criminal Procedure (Amendment No. 2) (Coronavirus) Rules 2020	2020. No.417	9 April 2020	To amend the Criminal Procedure Rules 2015 (SI 2015/1490) to remove inconsistencies with the provisions of the Coronavirus Act 2020.
Electronic Monitoring (Responsible Persons) (Coronavirus) (Amendment) Order 2020	2020 No.418	9 April 2020	To allow Attenti EM UK Ltd to be a person responsible for the electronic monitoring of prisoners to provide for the increased demand for such monitoring as a result of the temporary release of prisoners during the pandemic.
Land Registration (Amendment) Rules 2020	2020 No.425	15 April 2020	To allow HM Land Registry additional time for the registration of interests in land if the service is not able to operate normally.
Statutory Sick Pay (General) (Coronavirus Amendment) (No. 3) Regulations 2020	2020 No.427	15 April 2020	Amends the statutory sick pay regulations to provide that, a person who is considered to be at high risk from COVID-19 and has been advised to shield, is deemed to be incapable of work.
Local Government (Coronavirus) (Structural Changes) (Consequential Amendments) (England) Regulations 2020	2020 No.426	15 April 2020	To make changes to previous provisions providing for new unitary authorities in Buckinghamshire and Northamptonshire in light of the cancellation of elections due to take place in May 2020.
Safeguarding Vulnerable Groups Act 2006 (Regulated Activities) (Coronavirus) Order 2020	2020 No.433	17 April 2020	To provide that testing for coronavirus will not be treated as a regulated activity under the Safeguarding Vulnerable Groups Act 2006.
Competition Act 1998 (Health Services for Patients in Wales) (Coronavirus) (Public Policy Exclusion) Order 2020	2020 No.435	20 April 2020	To exclude certain agreements between independent healthcare providers and NHS bodies from the restriction on anti-competitive behaviour under the Competition Act 1998.
Football Spectators (2020 UEFA European Championship Control Period) (Coronavirus) (Revocation) Order 2020	2020 No.432	21 April 2020	Revokes the Football Spectators (2020 UEFA European Championship Control Period) Order 2020 (SI 2020/11) following the announced cancellation of UEFA Euro 2020.
Health Protection (Coronavirus, Restrictions) (England) (Amendment) Regulations 2020	2020 No.447	22 April 2020	To make amendments to the original lockdown restrictions to correct certain errors and unintended consequences. Provided that leaving home to go to a bank or ATM or to attend a burial ground constituted a reasonable excuse.
Offshore Petroleum Production and Pipe-lines (Assessment of Environmental Effects) (Coronavirus) (Amendment) Regulations 2020	2020 No.448	22 April 2020	To remove the requirement for offshore oil and gas developers from the requirement to make certain documents relating to environmental impacts available for public inspection at an address in the UK.
Early Years Foundation Stage (Learning and Development and Welfare Requirements) (Coronavirus) (Amendment) Regulations 2020	2020 No.444	23 April 2020	To allow for the Secretary of State for Education to temporarily disapply or modify certain requirements of the Statutory Framework for the Early Years Foundation Stage to allow providers of early years education to operate for children of key workers.
Adoption and Children (Coronavirus) (Amendment) Regulations 2020	2020 No.445	23 April 2020	To make amendments to a number of regulations relating to children's social care including the relaxation of a number of administrative and procedural requirements.
School Admissions (England) (Coronavirus) (Appeals Arrangements) (Amendment) Regulations 2020	2020 No.446	23 April 2020	To allow for appeals in respect of school admissions to continue by virtue of allowing smaller appeal panels to meet or by allowing appeals to be heard remotely.
Non-Domestic Rating (Transitional Protection Payments and Rates Retention) (Coronavirus) (Amendment) Regulations 2020	2020 No.449	23 April 2020	To allow local authorities to defer payments due to central Government under the business rates retention scheme. To delay the date on which local authorities are required to submit end-of year calculations of the business rates retention.
Maternity Allowance, Statutory Maternity Pay, Statutory Paternity Pay, Statutory Adoption Pay, Statutory Shared Parental Pay and Statutory Parental Bereavement Pay (Normal Weekly Earnings etc.) (Coronavirus) (Amendment) Regulations 2020	2020 No.450	24 April 2020	To ensure that where an employee is furloughed under the Coronavirus Job Retention Scheme they retain their rights to Statutory Maternity Pay; Statutory Adoption Pay; Statutory Paternity Pay; Statutory Shared Parental Pay; Statutory Parental Bereavement Pay; and Maternity Allowance.
Taking Control of Goods and Certification of Enforcement Agents (Amendment) (Coronavirus) Regulations 2020	2020 No.451	24 April 2020	To prevent enforcement agencies from taking control of goods at residential premises or on highways during lockdown, to extend the period for taking control of goods by 12 months and to increase the amount of unpaid commercial rent that might be outstanding before commercial rent arrears recovery can take place.
State Pension Credit (Coronavirus) (Electronic Claims) (Amendment) Regulations 2020	2020 No.456	27 April 2020	To make provision for State Pension Credit to be claimed electronically.
National Health Service (Quality Accounts) (Amendment) (Coronavirus) Regulations 2020	2020 No.456	28 April 2020	To suspend the requirement of providers of National Health Service services relating to obtaining assurance by other bodies of the quality accounts and publishing them for the year to 31 March 2020.
Misuse of Drugs (Coronavirus) (Amendments Relating to the Supply of Controlled Drugs During a Pandemic etc.) Regulations 2020	2020 No.468	29 April 2020	To allow pharmacists to supply certain medicines during the pandemic without a prescription where the patient has been receiving a controlled drug as part of an ongoing treatment.
Value Added Tax (Zero Rate for Personal Protective Equipment) (Coronavirus) Order 2020	2020 No.458	30 April 2020	Introduces a temporary Value Added Tax relief for the supply of personal protective equipment by treating the supplies of such equipment as being zero rated.
Value Added Tax (Extension of Zero-Rating to Electronically Supplied Books etc.) (Coronavirus) Order 2020	2020 No.459	30 April 2020	To extend the list of electronic versions of printed publications that will be treated as being zero rated for Value Added Tax purposes.
Education (School Teachers’ Qualifications and Induction Arrangements) (England) (Coronavirus) (Amendment) Regulations 2020	2020 No.464	30 April 2020	To allow for trainee teachers whose training has been interrupted by COVID-19 to be treated as having attained qualified teacher status. To allow for newly qualified teachers undertaking statutory induction to have their induction periods extended automatically where they were absent for work by reason of the COVID-19 outbreak.
Special Educational Needs and Disability (Coronavirus) (Amendment) Regulations 2020	2020 No.471	30 April 2020	Temporarily relaxes the timescales for dealing with special educational needs and disability where the original timescales cannot be met by reason of the COVID-19 outbreak.
Criminal Legal Aid (Coronavirus, Remuneration) (Amendment) Regulations 2020	2020 No.472	30 April 2020	To amend the circumstances in which litigators and advocates providing legal aid services are entitled to receive hardship payments by reducing the threshold for such payments and the period for payment.
Common Agricultural Policy (Control and Enforcement, Cross-Compliance, Scrutiny of Transactions and Appeals) (Coronavirus) (Amendment) (England) Regulations 2020	2020 No.477	1 May 2020	Amends certain rules relating to the application of the Common Agricultural Policy to extend the deadline for direct payments and the claims deadline for countryside stewardship, environmental stewardship and woodland grants.
Financial Services and Markets Act 2000 (Regulated Activities) (Coronavirus) (Amendment) Order 2020	2020 No.480	1 May 2020	To remove loans of £25,000 of less that are made by commercial lenders under the Bounce Back Loan Scheme from the scope of the regulatory regime relating to consumer credit loans.
Competition Act 1998 (Dairy Produce) (Coronavirus) (Public Policy Exclusion) Order 2020	2020 No.481	1 May 2020	Excludes certain agreements between produces of dairy products (and associated logistics providers) from certain prohibitions on anti-competitive behaviour under the Competition Act 1998.
Health Protection (Coronavirus, Restrictions) (England) (Amendment) (No. 2) Regulations 2020	2020 No.500	13 May 2020	Replaces the previous Lockdown Regulations and provides for revisions to the terms of the lockdown in England
Town and Country Planning (Development Management Procedure, Listed Buildings and Environmental Impact Assessment) (England) (Coronavirus) (Amendment) Regulations 2020	2020 No.505	13 May 2020	Provide for temporary amendments to certain requirements for planning authorities to obtain an environmental impact assessment where it is not reasonable for an authority to comply with a specific request due to the effects of the COVID-19 pandemic.
Individual Savings Account (Amendment No. 3) (Coronavirus) Regulations 2020	2020 No.506	14 May 2020	Reduces the charge for unauthorized withdrawals from a Lifetime Individual Savings Account from 25% to 20% for the period from 6 March 2020 to 5 April 2021.
Prison and Young Offender Institution (Coronavirus) (Amendment) (No. 2) Rules 2020	2020 No.508	14 May 2020	To allow prisons and young offender institutions to implement a restricted regime to manage the impact of the COVID-19 pandemic.
Direct Payments to Farmers (Application Deadlines) (Coronavirus) (Amendment) (England) Regulations 2020	2020 No.510	14 May 2020	Extends the deadline for amendments to be made to applications for direct payments for 2020 to 30 June.
Statutory Sick Pay (Coronavirus) (Funding of Employers’ Liabilities) Regulations 2020	2020 No.512	15 May 2020	Provide for certain small and medium-sized employers to apply to HMRC for a refund of the cost of paying Statutory Sick Pay to their employees where they are unable to work because of COVID-19.
Civil Legal Aid (Remuneration) (Amendment) (Coronavirus) Regulations 2020	2020 No.515	18 May 2020	Introduces two new standard fees payable for asylum and immigration cases which are appealing to the First-tier Tribunal (Immigration and Asylum Chamber).
Universal Credit (Coronavirus) (Self-employed Claimants and Reclaims) (Amendment) Regulations 2020	2020 No.522	20 May 2020	To determine the interaction between coronavirus support payments received by self-employed individuals and eligibility for such persons to claim universal credit.
Income Tax (Exemption for Coronavirus Related Home Office Expenses) Regulations 2020	2020 No.524	21 May 2020	Provides for a new temporary exemption to allow employers to reimburse employees who are working from home for the cost of acquiring home equipment without such a reimbursement being taxable income.
Social Security Contributions (Disregarded Payments) (Coronavirus) Regulations 2020	2020 No.525	21 May 2020	To provide that the reimbursement of costs incurred by an employee for the acquisition of home office equipment (in line with SI 2020/524) will not be subject to national insurance contributions.
Tax Credits (Coronavirus, Miscellaneous Amendments) Regulations 2020	2020 No.534	22 May 2020	Protect a person's entitlement to working tax credit and to allow workers to continue to receive working tax credit if they would have been engaged in work if it were not for the impact of COVID-19.
Traffic Orders Procedure (Coronavirus) (Amendment) (England) Regulations 2020	2020 No.536	22 May 2020	Makes amendments to enable local authorities to deal with the effect of coronavirus on transport to support social distancing requirements and to make digital notifications of changes.
Statutory Sick Pay (General) (Coronavirus Amendment) (No. 4) Regulations 2020	2020 No.539	27 May 2020	To provide that, where person who has been advised that they have been in contact with someone who has coronavirus and that they should self-isolate shall be entitled to statutory sick pay if they are unable to work as a result of the requirement to self-isolate.
Schools Forums (England) (Coronavirus) (Amendment) Regulations 2020	2020 No.540	28 May 2020	Allows school forums to hold public meetings remotely where they are unable to meet physically due to the COVID-19 pandemic.
Education (Independent School Standards) (Coronavirus) (Amendment) Regulations 2020	2020 No.542	28 May 2020	Provides for more flexibility in relation to applications for enhanced criminal record certificates.
School Discipline (England) (Coronavirus) (Pupil Exclusions and Reviews) (Amendment) Regulations 2020	2020 No.543	28 May 2020	Provides for meetings to scrutinise school exclusions to be held virtually and for the time limits for such meetings to be extended where it has not been reasonably practical to hold the meeting.
Education (Pupil Registration) (England) (Coronavirus) (Amendment) Regulations 2020	2020 No.544	28 May 2020	Temporarily suspends the obligations on schools to record details in their attendance register and to provide for increased flexibility for schools to record attendance during the 2019–20 school year.
Health Protection (Coronavirus, Restrictions) (England) (Amendment) (No. 3) Regulations 2020	2020 No.558	1 June 2020	Relaxed the previous lockdown restrictions to remove the restriction on leaving home without a reasonable excuse which was replaced with a restriction on staying overnight away from home. To allow for outdoor gatherings of up to 6 people and indoor gatherings of people from two households. To allow certain businesses to reopen, predominantly those operating outdoors.
Prosecution of Offences Act 1985 (Specified Proceedings) (Amendment) Order 2020	2020 No.562	2 June 2020	Provides that offences of the Health Protection (Coronavirus, Restrictions) (England) Regulations 2020 (SI 2020/350) and the Health Protection (Coronavirus Restrictions) (Wales) Regulations 2020 (SI 2020/353) become 'specified proceedings' for the purpose of the Prosecution of Offences Act 1985.
Human Fertilisation and Embryology (Statutory Storage Period for Embryos and Gametes) (Coronavirus) Regulations 2020	2020 No.566	3 June 2020	Extends the statutory period for which gametes and embryos can be stored by fertility clinics from 10 years to 12 years.
Health Protection (Coronavirus, Public Health Information for Passengers Travelling to England) Regulations 2020	2020 No.567	3 June 2020	Requires operators of commercial transport services for passengers travelling to England from outside of the common travel area to provide information to passengers about coronavirus, coronavirus disease and related duties and public health guidance.
Health Protection (Coronavirus, International Travel) (England) Regulations 2020	2020 No.568	3 June 2020	Requires passengers arriving in England from outside of the common travel area to self-isolate for 14 days and provide personal and contact details.
Direct Payments to Farmers (Inspections) (Coronavirus) (England) Regulations 2020	2020 No.575	9 June 2020	Reduces the rates of on-the-spot control checks which the Rural Payments Agency will carry out for 2020 and allows for such checks to be replaced by alternative means (e.g. satellite imagery).
Value Added Tax (Section 55A) (Specified Services and Excepted Supplies) (Change of Commencement Day and Amendment) (Coronavirus) Order 2020	2020 No.578	9 June 2020	To delay the introduction of the domestic reverse charge for value added tax on construction services from 1 October 2020 to 1 March 2021.
Civil Procedure (Amendment No. 2) (Coronavirus) Rules 2020	2020 No.582	10 June 2020	Amends the Civil Procedure Rules to provide for possession proceedings to be stayed until 24 August 2020.
Health Protection (Coronavirus, Restrictions) (England) (Amendment) (No. 4) Regulations 2020	2020 No.588	12 June 2020	Further relaxes the lockdown restrictions to allow for the reopening of non-essential retail, indoor markets, community centres and private prayer in places of worship. To allow persons to stay overnight with certain linked households.
Health Protection (Coronavirus, Wearing of Face Coverings on Public Transport) (England) Regulations 2020	2020 No.592	15 June 2020	Requires individuals travelling on public transport in England to wear a face covering.
General Osteopathic Council (Coronavirus) (Amendment) Rules Order of Council 2020	2020 No.596	17 June 2020	To allow the General Osteopathic Council to amend its rules when determining how to contact registrants where a fitness to practise or professional conduct allegation is made against them. The amendments allow such contact to be made by e-mail rather than post.
Education (Pupil Information) (England) (Coronavirus) (Amendment) Regulations 2020	2020 No.599	18 June 2020	To remove the requirement for head teachers to include in their annual report to parents information on the pupil's attendance and certain information connected to assessment at Key Stage 1 and 2 due to the impact of COVID-19 on attendance and cancellation of assessments for key stage 1 and 2.
Business Tenancies (Protection from Forfeiture: Relevant Period) (Coronavirus) (England) Regulations 2020	2020 No.602	19 June 2020	Prevents landlords of commercial properties from being able to evict tenants for non-payment of rent until 30 September 2020. Extends the previous moratorium which was due to end on 30 June 2020
Taking Control of Goods and Certification of Enforcement Agents (Amendment) (No. 2) (Coronavirus) Regulations 2020	2020 No.614	19 June 2020	Increases the minimum amount of unpaid rent that must be outstanding before commercial rent arrears recovery may take place to 189 days rent.
Coronavirus Life Assurance Scheme (English and Welsh Schemes) (Excluded Benefits for Tax Purposes) Regulations 2020	2020 No.615	22 June 2020	Exempts any lump sum payments made from the National Health Service Care Coronavirus Life Assurance Scheme from the charge to income tax.
Enterprise Act 2002 (Specification of Additional Section 58 Consideration) Order 2020	2020 No.627	22 June 2020	Amends the Enterprise Act 2002 to allow the secretary of state to intervene on the basis of consideration of mergers and acquisitions where such a transaction may impact the UK's ability to manage and mitigate public health emergencies.
Town and Country Planning (Permitted Development and Miscellaneous Amendments) (England) (Coronavirus) Regulations 2020	2020 No.632	24 June 2020	To relax certain planning laws relating to permitted development rights to support the governments economic renewal package following the COVID-19 outbreak.
Limited Liability Partnerships (Amendment etc.) Regulations 2020	2020 No.643	26 June 2020	Make various amendments to allow for the new insolvency and restructuring measures introduced by the Corporate Insolvency and Governance Act 2020 to apply to limited liability partnerships.
Companies etc. (Filing Requirements) (Temporary Modifications) Regulations 2020	2020 No.645	26 June 2020	Temporarily extends various filing deadlines relevant to corporate bodies.
Patents, Trade Marks and Registered Designs (Fees) (Coronavirus) (Amendment) Rules 2020	2020 No.644	29 June 2020	Temporarily reduces fees payable to the Intellectual Property Office in relation to patents, trade marks and designs.
Domestic Renewable Heat Incentive Scheme and Renewable Heat Incentive Scheme (Amendment) Regulations 2020	2020 No.650	29 June 2020	Extends the Domestic Renewable Heat Incentive Scheme by a further twelve months and to provide a new tariff guarantee on for the equivalent non-domestic scheme.
Tribunal Procedure (Amendment) Rules 2020	2020 No.651	30 June 2020	To amend the rules applying to tribunals to correct certain administrative issues in the previous statutory instruments and to update the rules for other changes in law.
Childcare Payments (Coronavirus and Miscellaneous Amendments) Regulations 2020	2020 No.656	30 June 2020	Provides that critical workers who exceed the maximum income threshold due to increase income for reasons connected with the COVID-19 outbreak can continue to claim tax-free childcare.
Electric Scooter Trials and Traffic Signs (Coronavirus) Regulations and General Directions 2020	2020 No.663	30 June 2020	Amends road traffic regulations to allow for on-road trials of e-scooters.
Secure Training Centre (Coronavirus) (Amendment) Rules 2020	2020 No.664	1 July 2020	Provides for temporary modifications to the operation of privately operated secure training centres to ensure such centres can operate effectively during the COVID-19 pandemic.
Statutory Sick Pay (Coronavirus) (Suspension of Waiting Days and General Amendment) (No. 2) Regulations 2020	2020 No.681	3 July 2020	To provide clarification on the eligibility of people who are shielding as a result of the COVID-19 pandemic to received statutory sick pay. Ensures persons self-isolating because a member of their households has symptoms may be eligible for statutory sick pay.
Health Protection (Coronavirus, Restrictions) (No. 2) (England) Regulations 2020	2020 No.684	3 July 2020	Replaces all previous lockdown regulations and provides for a revised set of lockdown regulations. Certain businesses are required to remain closed but many businesses and activities that had been prevented under the previous restrictions were now allowed to resume.
Health Protection (Coronavirus, Restrictions) (Leicester) Regulations 2020	2020 No.685	3 July 2020	Provides for a local lockdown in Leicester due to an increase number of coronavirus cases as compared to the rest of England.
Health Protection (Coronavirus, International Travel and Public Health Information) (England) (Amendment) Regulations 2020	2020 No.691	4 July 2020	Provides for a list of countries and territory for which passengers can travel to England without the requirement to quarantine when arriving in England.
Pension Protection Fund (Moratorium and Arrangements and Reconstructions for Companies in Financial Difficulty) Regulations 2020	2020 No.693	4 July 2020	Provides specific protections for pension schemes during a moratorium or where a restructuring plan is proposed under the new provisions provided under the Corporate Insolvency and Governance Act 2020.
Charitable Incorporated Organisations (Insolvency and Dissolution) (Amendment) Regulations 2020	2020 No.710	8 July 2020	To ensure that the provisions allowing for moratoriums under the Corporate Insolvency and Governance Act 2020 applies effectively to charitable companies.
Value Added Tax (Zero Rate for Personal Protective Equipment) (Extension) (Coronavirus) Order 2020	2020 No.698	9 July 2020	To extend the period for which supplies of personal protective equipment are treated as being zero-rated for value added tax to 31 October 2020.
International Tax Enforcement (Disclosable Arrangements) (Coronavirus) (Amendment) Regulations 2020	2020 No.713	9 July 2020	To defer the reporting date under DAC6 (the EU mandatory disclosure regime on certain tax arrangement) by six months to January 2021.
Childcare (Early Years Provision Free of Charge) (Extended Entitlement) (Coronavirus) (Amendment) Regulations 2020	2020 No.712	10 July 2020	Temporarily changes the maximum income threshold eligibility criteria for free childcare for working parents of three and four year olds to ensure that critical workers with increased income due to the COVID-19 pandemic can still access childcare.
Health Protection (Coronavirus, Restrictions) (No. 2) (England) (Amendment) Regulations 2020	2020 No.719	10 July 2020	Allows for the reopening of a number of businesses including outdoor pools, nail bars, beauty salons, spas and tattoo parlours.
Health Protection (Coronavirus, International Travel) (England) (Amendment) (No. 2) Regulations 2020	2020 No.724	10 July 2020	Removes Serbia from the list of countries for which quarantine free travel can be undertaken to England.
Value Added Tax (Reduced Rate) (Hospitality and Tourism) (Coronavirus) Order 2020	2020 No.728	14 July 2020	Provides that a reduced rate of value added tax of 5% will apply to certain supplies relating to hospitality, holiday accommodation and admission to attractions for the period from 15 July 2020 to 12 January 2021.
Town and Country Planning (Local Planning) (England) (Coronavirus) (Amendment) Regulations 2020	2020 No.731	15 July 2020	Removes, on a temporary basis until 31 December 2020, the requirements on local planning authorities to make documents available for physical inspection or to provide hard copies of documents. Documents will still be required to be made available digitally.
Environmental Assessment of Plans and Programmes (Coronavirus) (Amendment) Regulations 2020	2020 No.734	15 July 2020	Amends, on a temporary basis until 31 December 2020, the requirements for documents relation to strategic environmental assessments to be made available for physical inspection. The documents will be required to be available for inspection online.
Co-operative and Community Benefit Societies and Credit Unions (Arrangements, Reconstructions and Administration) (Amendment) and Consequential Amendments Order 2020	2020 No.744	17 July 2020	Amends rules relating to co-operative and community benefit societies to allow the new insolvency rescue legislation introduced by the Corporate Insolvency and Governance Act 2020 to apply to such entities.
Civil Procedure (Amendment No. 3) Rules 2020	2020 No.747	17 July 2020	Makes numerous amendments to the Civil Procedure Rules relating to costs and budgeting, Welsh judicial reviews, false statements, requests for evidence following Brexit, legal adviser unless order provisions, tainted acquittals, contempt of court and possession.
Health Protection (Coronavirus, Restrictions) (England) (No. 3) Regulations 2020	2020 No.750	17 July 2020	To provide local authorities with powers relating to the control and prevention of coronavirus including the closure of premises, events or other outdoor public place.
Civil Procedure (Amendment No. 4) (Coronavirus) Rules 2020	2020 No.751	17 July 2020	Amends the Civil Procedure Rules to provide for arrangements for managing the resumption of possession proceedings.
Health Protection (Coronavirus, Restrictions) (Leicester) (Amendment) Regulations 2020	2020 No.754	20 July 2020	Removed the areas of Blaby and Charnwood from the local lockdown area of Leicester.
Criminal Procedure Rules 2020	2020 No.759	20 July 2020	Consolidate a number of previous orders relating to the Criminal Procedure Rules.
Enterprise Act 2002 (Turnover Test) (Amendment) Order 2020	2020 No.763	20 July 2020	Amends the Enterprise Act 2002 to enable the secretary of state to intervene in an increase number of mergers involving military and dual use technologies, advanced technologies, artificial intelligence, cryptographic authentication and advanced materials.
Town and Country Planning (General Permitted Development) (England) (Amendment) (No. 2) Order 2020	2020 No.755	21 July 2020	To allow for a new permanent permitted development right to allow existing houses to be extended to provide more living space by constructing additional stories.
Town and Country Planning (General Permitted Development) (England) (Amendment) (No. 3) Order 2020	2020 No.756	21 July 2020	Introduces a new permanent permitted development right to allow for the demolition of certain building to be replaced as new homes.
Town and Country Planning (Use Classes) (Amendment) (England) Regulations 2020	2020 No.757	21 July 2020	Create new use classes for planning permission purposes in respect of 'commercial, business and service' (Class E), 'learning and non-residential institutions' (Class F.1) and 'local community' (Class F.2).
Infrastructure Planning (Publication and Notification of Applications etc.) (Coronavirus) (Amendment) Regulations 2020	2020 No.764	21 July 2020	Make temporary amendments to the requirements to make certain documents available at specific places in respect of infrastructure works until 31 December 2020.
Town and Country Planning (Spatial Development Strategy) (Coronavirus) (Amendment) Regulations 2020	2020 No.765	21 July 2020	Remove until 31 December 2020 the requirement for the Mayor of London and combined authorities to make certain documents available for physical inspection and to provide hard copies.
Scotland Act 1998 (Agency Arrangements) (Specification) (Coronavirus) Order 2020	2020 No.776	22 July 2020	To allow Ministers of the Crown to exercise certain powers that would normally be within the powers of Scottish Ministers in relation to track and trace software on mobile phones which is to be used to support a reduction in the transmission of coronavirus.
Scotland Act 1998 (Agency Arrangements) (Specification) (Coronavirus) (No. 2) Order 2020	2020 No.777	22 July 2020	To allow Ministers of the Crown to exercise certain powers that would normally be within the powers of Scottish Ministers in relation to the operation of the Joint Biosecurity Centre.
Pension Protection Fund (Moratorium and Arrangements and Reconstructions for Companies in Financial Difficulty) (Amendment) Regulations 2020	2020 No.783	22 July 2020	To provide powers to the Pension Protection Fund to step in where an entity makes use of the new restructuring tools provided for in the Corporate Insolvency and Governance Act 2020.
Health Protection (Coronavirus, Restrictions) (Leicester) (Amendment) (No. 2) Regulations 2020	2020 No.787	23 July 2020	To allow for the reopening of certain non-essential businesses in Leicester as part of the relaxation of the local lockdown.
Health Protection (Coronavirus, Restrictions) (No. 2) (England) (Amendment) (No. 2) Regulations 2020	2020 No.788	23 July 2020	To allow for the reopening of indoor swimming pools, fitness and dance studios and gyms in England.
Motor Vehicles (Tests) (Amendment) (Coronavirus) (No. 2) Regulations 2020	2020 No.790	23 July 2020	Provides for the re-introduction of mandatory motor vehicle tests from 1 August 2020.
Health Protection (Coronavirus, Wearing of Face Coverings in a Relevant Place) (England) Regulations 2020	2020 No.791	23 July 2020	Requires members of the public to wear a face covering when in a shop or a transport hub.
Health Protection (Coronavirus, International Travel) (England) (Amendment) (No. 3) Regulations 2020	2020 No.799	24 July 2020	Added Estonia, Latvia, Saint Vincent and the Grenadines, Slovakia and Slovenia to the list of countries from which passengers arriving in England are not required to self-isolate on arrival.
Health Protection (Coronavirus, Restrictions) (Blackburn with Darwen and Luton) Regulations 2020	2020 No.800	24 July 2020	Introduced local lockdown restrictions in Blackburn with Darwen in Lancashire.
Health Protection (Coronavirus, International Travel) (England) (Amendment) (No. 4) Regulations 2020	2020 No.805	27 July 2020	To remove Spain from the list of countries from which passengers arriving in England are not required to self-isolate on arrival.
Overseas Territories (Constitutional Modifications) Order 2020	2020 No.780	29 July 2020	To modify the constitutions of the Falkland Islands and St Helena, Ascension and Tristan da Cunha to allow virtual meetings of their legislative bodies to take place.
Local Authorities and Police and Crime Panels (Coronavirus) (Flexibility of Local Authority and Police and Crime Panel Meetings) (England and Wales) (Amendment) Regulations 2020	2020 No.808	30 July 2020	To provide relaxations to the requirements to hold various public meetings and to alter the frequency and occurrence of such meetings.
Local Government (Structural Changes) (Coronavirus) (Amendment) Regulations 2020	2020 No.809	30 July 2020	Extend the period for time for single tier authorities with reorganisation dates in 2019, 2020 and 2021 to prepare from 24 months to 36 months from the reorganisation date.
Road Vehicles (Certificates of Temporary Exemption) Regulations 2020	2020 No.812	30 July 2020	Allows the Secretary of State for Transport to issue temporary exemptions from the requirement for public services vehicles and goods vehicles to hold a test certificate.
Health Protection (Coronavirus, International Travel) (England) (Amendment) (No. 5) Regulations 2020	2020 No.813	30 July 2020	Provides for certain limited reasons for people to leave their homes and receive visitors when requiring to self isolate on returning from non-exempt territories. Removed exemption from self-isolation for medical and care professionals entering the UK.
Employment Rights Act 1996 (Coronavirus, Calculation of a Week's Pay) Regulations 2020	2020 No.814	30 July 2020	Provides that various statutory entitlement (including redundancy pay, notice pay and compensation for unfair dismissal) are not reduced as a result of the employee being furloughed under the Coronavirus Job Retention Scheme.
Electricity (Individual Exemptions from the Requirement for a Transmission Licence) (Coronavirus) Order 2020	2020 No.815	31 July 2020	To grant a limited exemption to the requirement to hold an electricity transmission licence to a number of offshore wind farms.
Health Protection (Coronavirus, International Travel) (England) (Amendment) (No. 6) Regulations 2020	2020 No.819	31 July 2020	To remove Luxembourg from the list of countries from which passengers arriving in England are not required to self-isolate on arrival.
Health Protection (Coronavirus, Restrictions) (Blackburn with Darwen and Bradford) Regulations 2020	202- No.822	31 July 2020	Revokes the previous regulations local lockdown regulations for Blackburn with Darwen and Luton. Replaces these with new lockdown regulations for Blackburn with Darwen and added Bradford to the lockdown.
Education (Pupil Registration) (England) (Coronavirus) (Amendment) (No. 2) Regulations 2020	2020 No.816	3 August 2020	To make provision for recording when a pupil is not attending school for reasons relating to coronavirus during the 2020–21 academic year.
Health Protection (Coronavirus, Restrictions) (Leicester) (Amendment) (No. 3) Regulations 2020	2020 No.823	3 August 2020	To remove the boroughs of Oadby and Wigston from the area subject to a local lockdown.
Health Protection (Coronavirus, Restrictions) (Leicester) (No. 2) Regulations 2020	2020 No.824	3 August 2020	Repealed the previous local lockdown restrictions in Leicester and replaced them with new lockdown measures.
Health Protection (Coronavirus, Restrictions on Gatherings) (North of England) Regulations 2020	2020 No.828	4 August 2020	Introduced local lockdown measures for the North of England including regions within Greater Manchester, Lancashire and West Yorkshire.
Statutory Sick Pay (General) (Coronavirus Amendment) (No. 5) Regulations 2020	2020 No.829	4 August 2020	Extends eligibility for statutory sick pay to cover people who are self isolating in line with guidance published by Public Health England.
Nursing and Midwifery Council (Coronavirus) (Amendment) (No. 2) Rules Order of Council 2020	2020 No.821	5 August 2020	To make certain technical amendments to a number of provisions relating to the operation of the Nursing and Midwifery Council to allow it to continue to operate effectively during the COVID-19 pandemic.
Health Protection (Coronavirus, Wearing of Face Coverings in a Relevant Place) (England) (Amendment) Regulations 2020	2020 No.839	7 August 2020	Extends the range of premises within which it is mandatory to wear a face covering to include indoor places of worship, crematoria and burial ground chapels, museums, galleries, cinemas, public libraries, public spaces in hotels (such as lobby areas) and community centres.
Health Protection (Coronavirus, International Travel) (England) (Amendment) (No. 7) Regulations 2020	2020 No.841	7 August 2020	Added Brunei and Malaysia to the list of countries from which passengers arriving in England are not required to self-isolate on arrival. Removed Andorra, The Bahamas and Belgium from that list.
Health Protection (Coronavirus, Restrictions on Gatherings) (North of England) (Amendment) Regulations 2020	2020 No.846	10 August 2020	Extended the local lockdown restrictions in the North of England to include Preston.
Education (Induction Arrangements for School Teachers) (England) (Coronavirus) (Amendment) Regulations 2020	2020 No.842	11 August 2020	Extends the period during which absences by a newly qualified teacher related to coronavirus will not contribute towards the 30 day absence limit to cover the 2020–21 academic year.
Education (National Curriculum Assessment Arrangements, Attainment Targets and Programmes of Study) and (Pupil Information and School Performance Information) (Amendment) (England) Regulations 2020	2020 No.844	11 August 2020	Makes a number of changes to the assessment and educational framework for school children.
Charitable Incorporated Organisations (Insolvency and Dissolution) (Amendment) (No. 2) Regulations 2020	2020 No.856	13 August 2020	To revoke the Charitable Incorporated Organisations (Insolvency and Dissolution) (Amendment) Regulations 2020 (SI 2020/710) which included drafting errors and omissions and to replace it with a corrected version of the same regulations.
Offshore Chemicals and Offshore Petroleum Activities (Oil Pollution Prevention and Control) (Coronavirus) (Amendment) Regulations 2020	2020 No.855	14 August 2020	Removes the requirement for offshore oil and gas operators to make certain documents available for public inspection where the effects of COVID-19 mean that it is not reasonably practical for the public to inspect documents in person.
Health Protection (Coronavirus, Restrictions) (No. 2) (England) (Amendment) (No. 3) Regulations 2020	2020 No.863	14 August 2020	Allow certain further businesses to re-open, specifically indoor casinos, indoor skating rinks, indoor play areas, bowling alleys and conference centres and exhibition halls.
Health Protection (Coronavirus, Restrictions on Gatherings) (North of England) (Amendment) (No. 2) Regulations 2020	2020 No.865	14 August 2020	Extended the local lockdown in the North of England requiring that casinos, indoor skating rinks, indoor play areas including soft play areas, and conference centres and exhibition halls which are allowed to reopen elsewhere in England cannot reopen in the area subject to the lockdown.
Health Protection (Coronavirus, International Travel) (England) (Amendment) (No. 8) Regulations 2020	2020 No.866	14 August 2020	Removes Aruba, France, Malta, Monaco, the Netherlands and Turks and Caicos Islands from the list of countries from which individuals can travel to England without being required to self-isolate.
Health Protection (Coronavirus, Restrictions) (Leicester) (No. 2) (Amendment) Regulations 2020	2020 No.875	18 August 2020	Allowed the reopening of various businesses which had been required to remain closed due to the local lockdown in Leicester, including a number of businesses where there would be close-contact between individuals.
Health Protection (Coronavirus, International Travel) (England) (Amendment) (No. 9) Regulations 2020	2020 No.881	21 August 2020	Removes Austria, Croatia and Trinidad and Tobago from the list of countries from which individuals can travel to England without being required to self-isolate and adds Portugal to the list. (Note: Repealed by the Health Protection (Coronavirus, International Travel) (England) (Amendment) (No. 10) Regulations 2020 (SI 2020/890) before it entered into force)
Health Protection (Coronavirus, Wearing of Face Coverings in a Relevant Place) (England) (Amendment) (No. 2) Regulations 2020	2020 No.882	21 August 2020	Expands the list of places where a face covering must be worn to include casinos, members clubs, social clubs and conference centres.
National Health Service (Coronavirus) (Charges and Further Amendments Relating to the Provision of Primary Care Services During a Pandemic etc.) Regulations 2020	2020 No.885	24 August 2020	To make changes to the rules relating to prescription charging, dental services and ophthalmic services with regards to the completion of forms to reduce the risk of cross-infection. To delay the production of pharmaceutical needs assessments.
Civil Procedure (Amendment No. 5) (Coronavirus) Rules 2020	2020 No.889	24 August 2020	Amends the Civil Procedure Rules to extend the stay on possession proceedings for a further period of four weeks to 20 September 2020.
Health Protection (Coronavirus, International Travel) (England) (Amendment) (No. 10) Regulations 2020	2020 No.890	24 August 2020	To remove Austria, Croatia and Trinidad and Tobago from the list of countries from which people may travel to England without requiring to self isolate and to add Portugal to the list.
Statutory Sick Pay (General) (Coronavirus Amendment) (No. 6) Regulations 2020	2020 No.892	25 August 2020	To extend the eligibility for statutory sick pay to include people who are self-isolating prior to admittance to hospital for planned or elective surgery.
Health Protection (Coronavirus, Restrictions) (North of England) (Amendment) Regulations 2020	2020 No.897	25 August 2020	To remove Wigan and Rossendale from the area in the North of England that was subject to a local lockdown.
Health Protection (Coronavirus, Restrictions) (Blackburn with Darwen and Bradford) (Amendment) Regulations 2020	2020 No.898	25 August 2020	To amend the area that was subject to local lockdown restrictions to certain wards.
Local Government Pension Scheme (Amendment) (No. 2) Regulations 2020	2020 No.893	27 August 2020	Provides that administering authorities may amend the contributions made by employers to the Local Government Pension Scheme and that where an employer is exiting the scheme then any exit payment may be spread of deferred.
Health Protection (Coronavirus, Wearing of Face Coverings in a Relevant Place and on Public Transport) (England) (Amendment) Regulations 2020	2020 No.906	27 August 2020	Introduced a new penalty regime for individuals who failed to wear a face covering where required to do so with the maximum penalty increasing to £3,200 for repeat offenders.
Health Protection (Coronavirus) (Restrictions on Holding of Gatherings and Amendment) (England) Regulations 2020	2020 No.907	27 August 2020	Prohibits gatherings of more than 30 persons (including in private dwellings) and introduces a penalty of £10,000 for persons that host or facilitate such gatherings. Business premises were largely exempt from this restriction.
National Health Service (General Medical Services Contracts and Personal Medical Services Agreements) (Amendment) (No. 2) Regulations 2020	2020 No.911	27 August 2020	To implement agreements between the National Health Service and the British Medical Association with regards to the contracts for general practitioners and to amend drafting errors in the National Health Service (Amendments Relating to the Provision of Primary Care Services During a Pandemic etc.) Regulations 2020 (SI 2020/351).
School Discipline (England) (Coronavirus) (Pupil Exclusions and Reviews) (Amendment) (No. 2) Regulations 2020	2020 No.908	28 August 2020	Provides for certain meetings and reviews of pupil exclusions to be held remotely and to extend the period in which such reviews must be undertaken where there is a delay due to the impact of COVID-19.
Adoption and Children (Coronavirus) (Amendment) (No. 2) Regulations 2020	2020 No.090	28 August 2020	Temporarily amends various regulations relating to children's social care to manage the impact of the COVID-19 pandemic.
Health Protection (Coronavirus, International Travel) (England) (Amendment) (No. 11) Regulations 2020	2020 No.913	28 August 2020	Removed the Czech Republic, Jamaica, and Switzerland from the list of countries from which persons could travel to England without having to self isolate and added Cuba to that list.
Coronavirus Act 2020 (Residential Tenancies: Protection from Eviction) (Amendment) (England) Regulations 2020	2020 No.914	28 August 2020	Extends the period for which protections under the Coronavirus Act 2020 against evictions from residential premises will apply to 31 March 2020. Extends the notice period that landlords must give to evict tenants under these provisions to six months. Reduces this period where in certain scenarios where a reduced period is justified (e.g. series rent arrears, anti-social behaviour etc).
Health Protection (Coronavirus, Restrictions) (Greencore) Regulations 2020	2020 No.921	1 September 2020	Requires that workers at two sites run by Greencore in Northampton and members of their household would be required to self-isolate for two weeks in response to an outbreak of COVID-19 at the sites.
Assured Tenancies and Agricultural Occupancies (Forms) (England) (Amendment) and Suspension (Coronavirus) Regulations 2020	2020 No.924	1 September 2020	Makes a number of technical amendments to existing legislation and forms relating to intentions for landlords to seek possession under the Housing Act 1988.
Postponed Elections and Referendums (Coronavirus) and Policy Development Grants (Amendment) Regulations 2020	2020 No.926	1 September 2020	To address uncertainties and gaps in electoral law resulting in the postponement of elections that were due to take place in 2020 and had been postponed as a result of the COVID-19 pandemic.
Health Protection (Coronavirus, Restrictions) (Blackburn with Darwen and Bradford) (Amendment) (No. 2) Regulations 2020	2020 No.930	2 September 2020	Amended the area subject to a local lockdown in Blackburn with Darwen and Bradford to exclude all but certain wards within the City of Bradford Metropolitan District Council area.
Health Protection (Coronavirus, Restrictions) (North of England) (Amendment) (No. 2) Regulations 2020	2020 No.931	2 September 2020	Amended the area subject to local lockdown restrictions in the North of England to remove the borough council areas of Stockport, Burnley and Hyndburn from the protected area. Provides that only certain wards in other borough council areas will be subject to restrictions.
Competition Act 1998 (Coronavirus) (Public Policy Exclusions) (Amendment and Revocation) Order 2020	2020 No.933	3 September 2020	To amend previous orders made in respect of relaxations of anti-competitive behaviour in respect of the need for essential supplies during the COVID-19 pandemic. To revoke the order relating to grocery supplies and dairy produce.
Finance Act 2008, Section 135 (Coronavirus) Order 2020	2020 No.934	3 September 2020	Provides that HM Treasury considers the COVID-19 pandemic to be an emergency of national significance and provides that interest will not be charges on deferred payments of income tax or VAT which have been deferred under agreements with HMRC.
Health Protection (Coronavirus, Restrictions) (Blackburn with Darwen and Bradford) (Amendment) (No. 3) Regulations 2020	2020 No.935	3 September 2020	Amends the area subject to local lockdown restrictions in Blackburn with Darwen and Bradford to remove Windhill and Wrose from the protected area of the City of Bradford Metropolitan District Council.
Early Years Foundation Stage (Learning and Development and Welfare Requirements) (Coronavirus) (Amendment) (No. 2) Regulations 2020	2020 No.939	4 September 2020	To allow the Secretary of State for Education to disapply or modify certain requirements of the statutory framework for the Early Years Foundation Stage where it is not reasonably practical for these to be provided due to the restrictions imposed by the COVID-19 pandemic.
Tax Credits (Coronavirus, Miscellaneous Amendments) (No. 2) Regulations 2020	2020 No.941	4 September 2020	To ensure that payments under the government's coronavirus financial support schemes are not double counted or are disregarded entirely in calculating entitlements to tax credits.
Insolvency (Moratorium) (Special Administration for Energy Licensees) Regulations 2020	2020 No.943	4 September 2020	Modifies how the moratorium regime in the Insolvency Act 1986 (Note: Such moratoriums were introduced by the Corporate Insolvency and Governance Act 2020, introduced as part of the government response to coronavirus and which amended various provisions of the Insolvency Act 1986.) applies to energy companies by requiring such companies to notify the Secretary of State for Business, Energy and Industrial Strategy and Ofgem of a decision to apply for a moratorium.
Wills Act 1837 (Electronic Communications) (Amendment) (Coronavirus) Order 2020	2020 No.952	7 September 2020	Amends the Wills Act 1937 to permit the use of video technology for the witnessing of wills.
Prosecution of Offences (Custody Time Limits) (Coronavirus) (Amendment) Regulations 2020	2020 No.953	7 September 2020	To amend the maximum time periods for which accused persons can be held in custody prior to a trial or indictment to take account of the delays to the court process arising from the COVID-19 pandemic.
Health Protection (Coronavirus, Restrictions) (Blackburn with Darwen and Bradford, Leicester, and North of England) (Amendment) Regulations 2020	2020 No.954	7 September 2020	Permits the re-opening in various areas that had been subject to a local lockdown of a number of businesses and venues.
Feed-in Tariffs (Amendment) (Coronavirus) (No. 2) Order 2020	2020 No.957	8 September 1010	Provided small-scale renewable energy generators additional time to apply for accreditation under the feed-in tariff scheme as a result of delays to commissioning of projects due to the COVID-19 pandemic.
Health Protection (Coronavirus, International Travel) (England) (Amendment) (No. 12) Regulations 2020	2020 No.959	8 September 2020	Enables a regional approach to be taken in determining whether people travelling from certain areas to England are required to self-isolate and requires that people travelling to England from certain Greek islands will be required to self-isolate.
Co-operative and Community Benefit Societies and Credit Unions (Arrangements, Reconstructions and Administration) (Amendment) (No. 2) Order 2020	2020 No.963	9 September 2020	Corrects a number of errors and inconsistencies in existing law which arose as a result of the Pension Protection Fund (Moratorium and Arrangements and Reconstructions for Companies in Financial Difficulty) (Amendment) Regulations 2020 (SI 2020/783).
Education (Information About Individual Pupils) (England) (Amendment) Regulations 2020	2020 No.965	10 September 2020	To enable the collection of further details with regards to the attendance of school pupils including details of absences relating to coronavirus to enable the government to assess the impact of the pandemic on school attendance.
Coronavirus (Retention of Fingerprints and DNA Profiles in the Interests of National Security) (No. 2) Regulations 2020	2020 No.973	10 September 2020	Extends the deadline for the retention of fingerprints and DNA profiles for six months.
Health Protection (Coronavirus, Restrictions) (Bolton) Regulations 2020	2020 No.974	10 September 2020	Imposed a local lockdown in Bolton imposing a number of restrictions on movement, activities and businesses within the area of Bolton Metropolitan Borough Council.
Health Protection (Coronavirus, International Travel) (England) (Amendment) (No. 13) Regulations 2020	2020 No.980	11 September 2020	Removes French Polynesia, Hungary, Portugal (not including the islands that make up The Azores and Madeira), and Réunion from the list of countries from which people can travel to England without being required to self-isolate and adds Sweden to that list.
Health Protection (Coronavirus, Restrictions) (No. 2) (England) (Amendment) (No. 4) Regulations 2020	2020 No.986	14 September 2020	To reduce the size of permitted gatherings of people to a maximum of six people. Commonly referred to as the 'Rule of six'.
Health Protection (Coronavirus, Restrictions) (Leicester) (No. 2) (Amendment) (No. 2) Regulations 2020	2020 No.987	14 September 2020	Allowed for the further easing of restrictions that had been in place in Leicester to align the position with other areas subject to local restrictions.
Health Protection (Coronavirus, Restrictions) (Birmingham, Sandwell and Solihull) Regulations 2020	2020 No.988	14 September 2020	Introduces local restrictions (a local lockdown) for the areas of Birmingham, Sandwell and Solihull.
Pension Protection Fund (Moratorium and Arrangements and Reconstructions for Companies in Financial Difficulty) (Amendment and Revocation) Regulations 2020	2020 No.990	15 September 2020	Extends the rights of the Pension Protection Fund where moratoriums are put in place under the new insolvency rights under the Corporate Insolvency and Governance Act 2020 in relations to Co-operative and Community Benefit Societies.
Business Tenancies (Protection from Forfeiture: Relevant Period) (Coronavirus) (England) (No. 2) Regulations 2020	2020 No.994	16 September 2020	To further extend the period for which protections for business tenants granted under the Coronavirus Act 2020 will apply to ensure such protections will continue until 31 December 2020.
Civil Legal Aid (Remuneration) (Amendment) (No. 2) (Coronavirus) Regulations 2020	2020 No.1001	16 September 2020	Revokes the Civil Legal Aid (Remuneration) (Amendment) (Coronavirus) Regulations 2020 (SI 2020/515) and introduces a new fee system for legal aid in respect of asylum and immigration cases.
Taking Control of Goods (Amendment) (Coronavirus) Regulations 2020	2020 No.1002	16 September 2020	To increase the minimum amount of rent that must be outstanding before Commercial Rent Arrears Recovery may take place to 276 days rent during the period to 24 December 2020 and 366 days rent thereafter.
Employment Tribunals (Constitution and Rules of Procedure) (Early Conciliation: Exemptions and Rules of Procedure) (Amendment) Regulations 2020	2020 No.1003	17 September 2020	To provide greater flexibility over the operation of the employment tribunals.
Health Protection (Coronavirus, Collection of Contact Details etc and Related Requirements) Regulations 2020	2020 No.1005	17 September 2020	To require venues to collect certain contact details from customers, visitors and staff, to store such details and to share such details with NHS Test and Trace.
Health Protection (Coronavirus, Restrictions) (Obligations of Hospitality Undertakings) (England) Regulations 2020	2020 No.1008	17 September 2020	To place obligations on the hospitality industry to take reasonable steps to ensure that customers are socially distanced once in such premises and do not breach the 'Rule of six'.
Health Protection (Coronavirus, Restrictions) (North East of England) Regulations 2020	2020 No.1010	17 September 2020	To provide for local lockdown restrictions in Durham, Gateshead, Newcastle, Northumberland, North Tyneside, South Tyneside and Sunderland.
Health Protection (Coronavirus, Restrictions) (North East of England) (Amendment) Regulations 2020	2020 No.1012	18 September 2020	To correct drafting errors made in the Health Protection (Coronavirus, Restrictions) (North East of England) Regulations 2020 (SI 2020/1010).
Health Protection (Coronavirus, International Travel) (England) (Amendment) (No. 14) Regulations 2020	2020 No.1013	18 September 2020	Removes Guadeloupe and Slovenia from the list of places from which people may travel to England without being required to self-isolate on arrival and adds Singapore and Thailand to the list.
Health Protection (Coronavirus, Restrictions) (Protected Areas and Linked Childcare Households) (Amendment) Regulations 2020	2020 No.1019	22 September 2020	To allow for informal childcare arrangements to be made between families living in areas subject to local lockdown restrictions.
Health Protection (Coronavirus, Wearing of Face Coverings in a Relevant Place and on Public Transport) (England) (Amendment) (No. 2) Regulations 2020	2020 No.1021	22 September 2020	Extends the requirements for the wearing of face coverings on public transport to include those travelling in taxis and private hire vehicles.
Health Protection (Coronavirus, Wearing of Face Coverings in a Relevant Place and on Public Transport) (England) (Amendment) (No. 3) Regulations 2020	2020 No.1026	23 September 2020	Requires members of the public to wear face coverings in additional indoor premises and required that individuals working in certain retail, hospitality and leisure settings will be required to wear face coverings at work.
Health Protection (Coronavirus, Wearing of Face Coverings in a Relevant Place) (England) (Amendment) (No. 3) Regulations 2020	2020 No.1028	24 September 2020	To amend the previous face coverings regulations Health Protection (Coronavirus, Wearing of Face Coverings in a Relevant Place and on Public Transport) (England) (Amendment) (No. 3) Regulations 2020 (SI 2020/1026) to ensure that they covered further workers, including workers in public houses.
Health Protection (Coronavirus, Restrictions) (No. 2) (England) (Amendment) (No. 5) Regulations 2020	2020 No.1029	24 September 2020	Requires the closure of businesses selling food and drink to be consumed on site or for take away in person between the hours of 22:00 and 05:00.
Statutory Sick Pay (Coronavirus) (Funding of Employers' Liabilities) (Amendment) Regulations and the Statutory Sick Pay (Coronavirus) (Funding of Employers' Liabilities) (Northern Ireland) (Amendment) Regulations 2020	2020 No.1030	24 September 2020	Provides employers with continued access for support for the costs of paying statutory sick pay and make changes in accordance with changes made to EU state aid rules.
Corporate Insolvency and Governance Act 2020 (Coronavirus) (Extension of the Relevant Period) Regulations 2020	2020 No.1031	24 September 2020	Extends the duration for some of the temporary measures introduced by the Corporate Insolvency and Governance Act 2020 from 30 September 2020 to 31 December 2020. Extends the moratorium period to 31 March 2021.
Corporate Insolvency and Governance Act 2020 (Coronavirus) (Early Termination of Certain Temporary Provisions) Regulations 2020	2020 No.1033	25 September 2020	Amended the Corporate Insolvency and Governance Act 2020 to provide that the extension of time limits given by the Corporate Insolvency and Governance Act 2020 (Coronavirus) (Extension of the Relevant Period) Regulations 2020 (SI 2020/1031) will not apply to the provisions that allowed insolvency practitioners to disregard the impact of coronavirus when determining whether the company is capable of being rescued.
Health Protection (Coronavirus, International Travel) (England) (Amendment) (No. 15) Regulations 2020	2020 No.1039	25 September 2020	Removes Curaçao, Denmark, Iceland and Slovakia from the list of countries from which people travelling to England are not required to self-isolate on arrival.
Health Protection (Coronavirus, Restrictions) (Protected Areas and Restriction on Businesses) (Amendment) Regulations 2020	2020 No.1041	28 September 2020	Extends the areas subject to a local lockdown in the North of England and imposes restricted opening hours on certain businesses operating in areas subject to a local lockdown.
Health Protection (Coronavirus, Restrictions) (Self-Isolation) (England) Regulations 2020	2020 No.1045	28 September 2020	Requires persons who have testing positive for COVID-19 and their close contacts to self-isolate.
Health Protection (Coronavirus, Restrictions) (Obligations of Undertakings) (England) (Amendment) Regulations 2020	2020 No.1046	28 September 2020	Requires certain hospitality venues to take actions to prevent bookings of more than six persons to be made and to maintain social distancing between groups. Also limits singing, dancing and the volume at which music can be played in such venues.
Health Protection (Coronavirus, Restrictions) (North of England, North East and North West of England and Obligations of Undertakings (England) etc.) (Amendment) Regulations 2020	2020 No.1057	30 September 2020	Transferred certain areas in the North West of England such that they would be subject to the regulations imposed on the North of England and imposed further restrictions on remaining areas in the North West and North East of England.
Non-Contentious Probate (Amendment) Rules 2020	2020 No.1059	30 September 2020	Mandate the use of online processes for certain types of probate applications and allow for relaxations on the requirements relating to the processing of witness statements.
Social Security Contributions (Disregarded Payments) (Coronavirus) (England) Regulations 2020	2020 No.1065	1 October 2020	Ensures the payments made under the Test and Trace Support Payment Scheme to low income employees who have been asked to self-isolate by NHS Test and Trace will not be subject to National Insurance Contributions.
Health Protection (Coronavirus, International Travel) (England) (Amendment) (No. 16) Regulations 2020	2020 No.1070	1 October 2020	Introduces a new fixed penalty regime for individuals who do not comply with the required to self-isolate when arriving in England in accordance with the Health Protection (Coronavirus, International Travel) (England) Regulations 2020 (SI 2020/568).
Mental Health (Hospital, Guardianship and Treatment) (England) (Amendment) Regulations 2020	2020 No.1072	1 October 2020	Allows for certain forms used to exercise powers under the Mental Health Act 1983 to be serviced by electronic means.
Health Protection (Coronavirus, Restrictions) (North of England and North East and North West of England etc.) (Amendment) Regulations 2020	2020 No.1074	2 October 2020	Amends which areas are subject to local lockdown restrictions in the North of England, North East of England and North West of England.
Health Protection (Coronavirus, International Travel) (England) (Amendment) (No. 17) Regulations 2020	2020 No.1076	2 October 2020	Removes Bonaire, Sint Eustatius, Saba, Poland and Turkey from the list of countries from which persons are not required to self-isolate when travelling to England.
Prison and Young Offender Institution (Coronavirus, etc.) (Amendment) (No. 3) Rules 2020	2020 No.1077	5 October 2020	Makes amendments to the Prison Rules and the Young Offender Institution Rules relating to mandatory drug testing arrangements.
Health Protection (Coronavirus, Public Health Information for Passengers Travelling to England) (Amendment) Regulations 2020	2020 No.1090	9 October 2020	Placed requirements on travel operators to provide information on self-isolation requirements and health guidance to passengers travelling to England.
Employment and Support Allowance and Universal Credit (Coronavirus Disease) (Amendment) Regulations 2020	2020 No.1097	12 October 2020	Extends the periods for which the provisions of the Employment and Support Allowance and Universal Credit (Coronavirus Disease) Regulations 2020 (SI 2020/289) apply from either months to fourteen months in respect of Employment and Support Allowance.
Health Protection (Coronavirus, Local COVID-19 Alert Level) (Medium) (England) Regulations 2020	2020 No.1103	12 October 2020	Introduced a new form of tiered restrictions in England replacing the previous system of local lockdowns. Provided for the restrictions that apply to areas in the 'Medium Tier' (Tier 1).
Health Protection (Coronavirus, Local COVID-19 Alert Level) (High) (England) Regulations 2020	2020 No.1104	12 October 2020	Introduced a new form of tiered restrictions in England replacing the previous system of local lockdowns. Provided for the restrictions that apply to areas in the 'High Tier' (Tier 2).
Health Protection (Coronavirus, Local COVID-19 Alert Level) (Very High) (England) Regulations 2020	2020 No.1105	12 October 2020	Introduced a new form of tiered restrictions in England replacing the previous system of local lockdowns. Provided for the restrictions that apply to areas in the 'Very High Tier' (Tier 3).
Health Protection (Coronavirus, Local COVID-19 Alert Level) (High) (England) (Amendment) Regulations 2020	2020 No.1128	15 October 2020	Amends the tier restrictions to move London boroughs, parts of Essex, Barrow-in-Furness, York, North East Derbyshire, Chesterfield, Erewash and Elmbridge from tier 1 (medium) to tier 2 (high).
Human Medicines (Coronavirus and Influenza) (Amendment) Regulations 2020	2020 No.1125	16 October 2020	Allows for the expansion of the workforce able to administer COVID-19 vaccines and influenza vaccines and extends existing legal protections to such individuals. Also relaxed certain rules relating to the supply of such medicines.
Health Protection (Coronavirus, International Travel) (England) (Amendment) (No. 19) Regulations 2020	2020 No.1129	16 October 2020	Adds the island of Crete to the list of territories from which persons are not required to self-isolate when travelling to England and removes Italy, San Marino and the Vatican City State from that list.
Health Protection (Coronavirus, Local COVID-19 Alert Level) (Very High) (England) (Amendment) Regulations 2020	2020 No.1131	16 October 2020	Made a number of amendments to the restrictions that apply to areas within Tier 3 of the tier restrictions.
National Health Service (Charges and Pharmaceutical and Local Pharmaceutical Services) (Amendment) Regulations 2020	2020 No.1126	19 October 2020	Make changes to the provisions relating to new services and service updates for community pharmacies in order to support the deliver of the NHS Long Term Plan.
Coronavirus Act 2020 (Expiry of Mental Health Provisions) (England and Wales) Regulations 2020	(Draft, not yet made)	21 October 2020	Expires unused provisions of the Coronavirus Act 2020 addressing potential staff shortages in mental health services.
Health Protection (Coronavirus, Local COVID-19 Alert Level) (Medium, High and Very High) (England) (Amendment) Regulations 2020	2020 No.1154	22 October 2020	Provides for changes to the COVID-19 tier regulations in England to move a number of geographical areas from medium alert to high alert and a number of other areas from high alert to very high alert. Corrects certain errors in the original tier regulations.
Social Security (Coronavirus) (Prisoners) Amendment Regulations 2020	2020 No.1156	22 October 2020	Extends by 6 months the expiry date of the Social Security (Coronavirus) (Prisoners) Regulations 2020 (SI 2020/409), which allow individuals on temporary release from prison access to means tested benefits.
Health Protection (Coronavirus, International Travel) (England) (Amendment) (No. 20) Regulations 2020	2020 No.1161	23 October 2020	Add the Canary Islands, Denmark, Maldives and the Greek island of Mykonos to the list of countries from which persons travelling to England are not required to self-isolate on arrival and removes Liechtenstein from that list.
Health Protection (Notification) (Amendment) (Coronavirus) Regulations 2020	2020 No.1175	26 October 2020	Requires that a provider of point of care tests for the detection of COVID-19 must notify Public Health England of the result of the test.
Health Protection (Coronavirus, Local COVID-19 Alert Level) (Medium, High and Very High) (England) (Amendment) (No. 2) Regulations 2020	2020 No.1176	26 October 2020	Moves the area of Warrington Borough Council from being subject to tier 2 restrictions (High Risk) to being subject to tier 3 restrictions (Very High Risk) under the tier regulations.
Health Protection (Coronavirus, Local COVID-19 Alert Level) (Medium, High and Very High) (England) (Amendment) (No. 3) Regulations 2020	2020 No.1183	29 October 2020	Moves local council areas in Nottinghamshire from being subject to tier 2 restrictions (High Risk) to being subject to tier 3 restrictions (Very High Risk) under the tier regulations.
Health Protection (Coronavirus, International Travel) (England) (Amendment) (No. 21) Regulations 2020	2020 No.1190	30 October 2020	Removed Cyprus and Lithuania from the list of countries from which people travelling to England were not required to self-isolate on arrival.
Health Protection (Coronavirus, Local COVID-19 Alert Level) (High) (England) (Amendment) (No. 2) Regulations 2020	2020 No.1189	30 October 2020	Moves a number of areas up to tier 2 (high risk) areas as part of the classification system in the COVID-19 tier regulations in England.
Health Protection (Coronavirus, Local COVID-19 Alert Level) (High) (England) (Amendment) (No. 3) Regulations 2020	2020 No.1192	2 November 2020	Moves Carlisle up to a tier 2 (high risk) area as part of the classification system in the COVID-19 tier regulations in England.
Business and Planning Act 2020 (London Spatial Development Strategy) (Coronavirus) (Amendment) Regulations 2020	(Draft not yet made)	2 November 2020	
Official Controls (Animals, Feed and Food, Plant Health etc.) (Amendment) (EU Exit) Regulations 2020	(Draft not yet made)	2 November 2020	
Coronavirus Life Assurance Scheme (Northern Irish Scheme) (Excluded Benefits for Tax Purposes) Regulations 2020	2020 No.1198	3 November 2020	To exempt lump sum payments under the Health and Social Care Coronavirus Life Assurance (Northern Ireland) Scheme 2020 from the charge to income tax.
Health Protection (Coronavirus, Restrictions) (England) (No. 4) Regulations 2020	2020 No. 1200	3 November 2020	Introduces a new comprehensive lockdown for England starting on Thursday, 5 November 2020.
Social Security (Coronavirus) (Further Measures) (Amendment) and Miscellaneous Amendment Regulations 2020	2020 No.1201	3 November 2020	To extend the expiry date of the Social Security (Coronavirus) (Further Measures) Regulations 2020 (SI 2020/371) to ensure that financial support continued to be provided into 2021.
Local Authorities (Collection Fund: Surplus and Deficit) (Coronavirus) (England) Regulations 2020	2020 No. 1202	5 November 2020	To extend from one to three years, the period over which local authorities can repay deficits in their local tax collection funds which have accrued as a result of the economic impact of the COVID-19 pandemic.
Health Protection (Coronavirus, International Travel) (England) (Amendment) (No. 22) Regulations 2020	2020 No.1227	6 November 2020	Removes Denmark, Germany and Sweden from the list of countries from which passengers returning to England are not required to self-isolate.
Health Protection (Coronavirus, International Travel) (England) (Amendment) (No. 23) Regulations 2020	2020 No.1238	9 November 2020	To require all persons arriving from Denmark to self-isolate on arrival, including those that would previously have been of an exempt class.
Health Protection (Coronavirus, Travel from Denmark) (England) Regulations 2020	2020 No.1239	9 November 2020	Prohibits all aircraft and vessels whose last departure point was in Denmark from landing, or mooring in a port, in England.
Health Protection (Coronavirus, Restrictions) (England) (No. 4) (Amendment) Regulations 2020	2020 No.1242	9 November 2020	Provides for limited exemptions from the restriction on gatherings taking place outdoors to allow for Armistice Day commemorations.
Town and Country Planning (General Permitted Development) (England) (Amendment) Regulations 2020	2020 No.1243	11 November 2020	Makes a number of changes to planning laws, including to extend a number of relaxations that were introduced to allow businesses to operate during the COVID-19 pandemic.
Consumer Credit (Enforcement, Default and Termination Notices) (Coronavirus) (Amendment) Regulations 2020	2020 No.1248	11 November 2020	Mandates changes to the wording of debt collection letters following advice from the Money and Mental Health Policy Institute on the mental health impact of such letters.
Health Protection (Coronavirus, International Travel, Travel from Denmark) (England) (Amendment) Regulations 2020	2020 No.1277	13 November 2020	Removes Greece (other than specified islands) and the Sovereign Base Areas of Akrotiri and Dhekelia from the list of countries from which passengers may travel to England without being required to self-isolate. Adds Bahrain, Chile, Iceland, Laos, Qatar, Turks and Caicos Islands and United Arab Emirates to that list. Amends specific rules relating to travel from Denmark.
Public Health (Coronavirus) (Protection from Eviction and Taking Control of Goods) (England) Regulations 2020	2020 No.1290	16 November 2020	Prevents the enforcement of evictions against residential tenants, other than in very serious circumstances, during the second nationwide lockdown.
Health Protection (Coronavirus, International Travel) (England) (Amendment) (No. 24) Regulations 2020	2020 No.1292	16 November 2020	To exempt seasonal poultry workers who have travelled to England from the requirement to self-isolate on arrival.
Income Tax (Exemption of Minor Benefits) (Coronavirus) Regulations 2020	2020 No.1293	16 November 2020	To ensure that employees who are provided with a coronavirus antigen test by their employer will not be liable to an income tax benefit in kind charge.
Employment Rights Act 1996 (Coronavirus, Calculation of a Week's Pay) (Amendment) Regulations 2020	2020 No.1298	17 November 2020	Ensures that from 18 November 2020, statutory entitlements to various statutory entitlements including, redundancy pay, notice pay and compensation for unfair dismissal, are not reduced as a result of an employee being furloughed under the Coronavirus Job Retention Scheme.
Health Protection (Coronavirus, International Travel) (England) (Amendment) (No. 25) Regulations 2020	2020 No.1323	20 November 2020	Adds Bonaire, Sint Eustatius & Saba, Israel, Jerusalem, Namibia, Northern Mariana Islands, Rwanda, Sri Lanka, Uruguay and the United States Virgin Islands to the list of countries from which people can travel to England without being required to self-isolate on arrival.
Health Protection (Coronavirus, Restrictions) (England) (No. 4) (Amendment) (No. 2) Regulations 2020	2020 No.1326	20 November 2020	Permits the opening of businesses selling or supplying natural Christmas trees.
Health Protection (Coronavirus, International Travel) (England) (Amendment) (No. 26) Regulations 2020	2020 No.1337	24 November 2020	Allows travellers arriving in England to shorten the period for which they are required to self-isolate where the take a COVID-19 test after arriving.
Corporate Insolvency and Governance Act 2020 (Coronavirus) (Suspension of Liability for Wrongful Trading and Extension of the Relevant Period) Regulations 2020	2020 No.1349	25 November 2020	Suspends provisions relating to wrongful trading under the Insolvency Act 1986 from 26 November 2020 to 30 April 2021. Extends to 30 March 2021 measures introduced by the Corporate Insolvency and Governance Act 2020 regarding the manner in which corporate meetings are required to be held.
Health Protection (Coronavirus, International Travel) (England) (Amendment) (No. 27) Regulations 2020	2020 No.1360	27 November 2020	Adds Aruba, Bhutan, Kiribati, Mongolia, the Federated States of Micronesia, Samoa, Solomon Islands, Timor-Leste, Tonga and Vanuatu to the list of countries from which people can travel to England without being required to self-isolate on arrival. Removes Estonia and Latvia from that list. Revokes the Health Protection (Coronavirus, Travel from Denmark) (England) Regulations 2020 (SI 2020/1239), which had placed additional restrictions on travelers from Denmark.
Health Protection (Coronavirus, Restrictions) (All Tiers) (England) Regulations 2020	2020 No.1374	30 November 2020	Introduces the second tier restrictions in areas of England.
Health Protection (Coronavirus, Restrictions) (Local Authority Enforcement Powers and Amendment) (England) Regulations 2020	2020 No.1375	30 November 2020	Provides addition enforcement tools to local authorities in England in order to allow public health authorities to enforce restrictions put in place to mitigate the spread of COVID-19.
Parish and Community Meetings (Coronavirus) (Polls) (Amendment) (England) Rules 2020	2020 No.1355	1 December 2020	Postpones until 6 May 2021, or a date within 25 working days of 6 May 2021, all parish polls scheduled to take place before 6 May 2021.
Town and Country Planning (Local Planning, Development Management Procedure, Listed Buildings etc.) (England) (Coronavirus) (Amendment) Regulations 2020	2020 No.1398	3 December 2020	Makes a number of amendments to town and country planning in response to the COVID-19 pandemic, primarily to extend temporary modifications made in earlier regulations which we due to expire in December 2020 such that they now expire on 31 December 2021.
Vaccine Damage Payments (Specified Disease) Order 2020	2020 No.1411	3 December 2020	Adds COVID-19 to the list of specified diseases to which the Vaccine Damage Payment Act 1979 applies.
Value Added Tax (Reduced Rate) (Hospitality and Tourism) (Extension of Time Period) (Coronavirus) Order 2020	2020 No.1413	3 December 2020	Extends the temporary relief from Value Added Tax for certain hospitality businesses to 31 March 2021.
National Health Service (General Medical Services Contracts and Personal Medical Services Agreements) (Amendment) (No. 3) Regulations 2020	2020 No.1415	3 December 2020	Makes amendments to existing terms in contracts for primary medical services to improve the collection of data on the ethnicity of patients.
Health Protection (Coronavirus, International Travel) (England) (Amendment) (No. 28) Regulations 2020	2020 No.1424	4 December 2020	Provides new exemptions from the requirement for persons arriving in England to self-isolate on arrival for persons engaged in television production, accredited journalists, senior business directors, performing arts professionals and new signings of elite sportspersons.
Business Tenancies (Protection from Forfeiture: Relevant Period) (Coronavirus) (England) (No. 3) Regulations 2020	2020 No.1472	9 December 2020	Extends the period for which landlords of commercial properties are unable to evict tenants due to non-payment of rent to 31 March 2021.
Corporate Insolvency and Governance Act 2020 (Coronavirus) (Extension of the Relevant Period) (No. 2) Regulations 2020	2020 No.1483	9 December 2020	Extends the period for which temporary provisions restricting the use of statutory demands and winding up petitions which were introduced by the Corporate Insolvency and Governance Act 2020 to 31 March 2021.
Personal Protective Equipment (Temporary Arrangements) (Coronavirus) (England) Regulations 2020	2020 No.1484	9 December 2020	Continues temporary regulatory arrangements to facilitate the production and supply of personal protective equipment during the COVID-19 pandemic.
Tax Credits, Childcare Payments and Childcare (Extended Entitlement) (Coronavirus and Miscellaneous Amendments) Regulations 2020	2020 No.1515	11 December 2020	Provides for a number of changes to tax credits and benefit entitlements to provide that individuals should not lose their entitlement to such benefits as a result of not being engaged in remunerative work as a result of the COVID-19 pandemic and to ensure that certain payments (including NHS Test and Trace payments) are disregarded as income for the purpose of calculating tax credit and benefit entitlements.
Health Protection (Coronavirus, International Travel and Public Health Information) (England) (Amendment) (No. 2) Regulations 2020	2020 No.1517	11 December 2020	Shortens the period for which individuals travelling to England are required to self-isolate to ten days from arrival. Adds Botswana and Saudi Arabia to the list of countries from which self-isolation is not required and removes the Canary Islands from this list.
Health Protection (Coronavirus, Restrictions) (Self-Isolation and Linked Households) (England) Regulations 2020	2020 No.1518	11 December 2020	Reduces the period for which people are required to self-isolate after receiving a positive test for coronavirus from 14 days to 10 days.
Health Protection (Coronavirus, Restrictions) (All Tiers) (England) (Amendment) Regulations 2020	2020 No.1533	14 December 2020	Makes changes to the second tier restrictions to move the following areas from tier 2 (high risk) to tier 3 (very high risk): Greater London, the Essex districts of Basildon, Braintree, Brentwood, Castle Point, Chelmsford, Harlow, Epping Forest, Rochford, Maldon, Southend-on-Sea and Thurrock and the Hertfordshire districts of Broxbourne, Hertsmere, Three Rivers and Watford.
Social Security Contributions (Disregarded Payments) (Coronavirus) (No. 2) Regulations 2020	2020 No.1523	14 December 2020	To provide that where an employer pays or reimburses an employee for the cost of a coronavirus test there is no liability to pay national insurance contributions for either the employer or the employee. Territorial application in England.
Social Security Contributions (Disregarded Payments) (Coronavirus) (Scotland and Wales) Regulations 2020	2020 No.1532	15 December 2020	To provide that where an employer pays or reimburses an employee for the cost of a coronavirus test there is no liability to pay national insurance contributions for either the employer or the employee. Territorial application in Scotland and Wales.
Environmental Assessment of Plans and Programmes (Amendment) Regulations 2020	2020 No.1531	16 December 2020	Makes permanent the changes introduced by the Environmental Assessment of Plans and Programmes (Coronavirus) (Amendment) Regulations 2020 (SI 2020/734).
Infrastructure Planning (Publication and Notification of Applications etc.) (Amendment) Regulations 2020	2020 No.1534	16 December 2020	Makes permanent the changes introduced by the Infrastructure Planning (Publication and Notification of Applications etc.) (Coronavirus) (Amendment) Regulations 2020 (SI 2020/764).
Health Protection (Coronavirus, Restrictions) (All Tiers) (England) (Amendment) (No. 2) Regulations 2020	2020 No.1572	17 December 2020	Within the second tier restrictions, the counties of Bedfordshire, Buckinghamshire, the rest of Berkshire, the Cambridgeshire district of Peterborough, the rest of Hertfordshire, Surrey (except Waverley), the East Sussex districts of Hastings and Rother, and the Hampshire districts of Gosport, Havant and Portsmouth moved up to tier 3. Bristol and North Somerset moved down to tier 2. Herefordshire moved down to tier 1.
Human Medicines (Coronavirus) (Further Amendments) Regulations 2020	2020 No.1594	18 December 2020	Enacts measures relating to a number of legal issues arising from the COVID-19 vaccination programme in the United Kingdom primarily to allow for the use of Patient Group Directions and to allow doctors, nurses and pharmacists to supervise the assembly and preparation of the COVID-19 vaccine.
Health Protection (Coronavirus, International Travel) (England) (Amendment) (No. 29) Regulations 2020	2020 No.1595	18 December 2020	Removes Namibia, the United States Virgin Islands and Uruguay from the list of exempt countries or territories from which passengers arriving in England are not required to self-isolate on arrival. Adds an exemption for the requirement to self-isolate for persons carrying out essential work on the HS2 rail project.
Health Protection (Coronavirus, Restrictions) (All Tiers and Obligations of Undertakings) (England) (Amendment) Regulations 2020	2020 No.1611	21 December 2020	Within the second tier restrictions, the counties of Bedfordshire, Buckinghamshire, Berkshire, the Cambridgeshire district of Peterborough, Essex (except Colchester, Tendring and Uttlesford), Hertfordshire, Kent, Surrey (except Waverley), the East Sussex districts of Hastings and Rother, the Hampshire districts of Gosport, Havant and Portsmouth and all London boroughs moved up to tier 4.
Statutory Sick Pay (General) (Coronavirus Amendment) (No. 7) Regulations 2020	2020 No.1638	23 December 2020	Amends the statutory sick pay regulations to ensure that individuals remain eligible for Statutory Sick Pay for the full period where they are require to self-isolate where they have tested positive for COVID-19 or are in a household with someone who has tested positive.
Health Protection (Coronavirus, Travel from South Africa) (England) Regulations 2020	2020 No.1644	29 December 2020	Extends the requirement to self-isolate to persons in the same household as anyone arriving in England from South Africa. Removes most exemptions from the requirement to self-isolate from persons arriving from South Africa. Prohibits most direct passenger flights from South Africa to England.
Health Protection (Coronavirus, Restrictions) (All Tiers) (England) (Amendment) (No. 3) Regulations 2020	2020 No.1646	29 December 2020	Within the second tier restrictions, moves a number of areas within England to higher levels of restrictions from 26 December 2020 as a result of rising numbers of COVID-19 cases.
Health Protection (Coronavirus, Restrictions) (All Tiers) (England) (Amendment) (No. 4) Regulations 2020	2020 No.1654	30 December 2020	Within the second tier restrictions, moves a number of areas within England to higher levels of restrictions from 31 December 2020.
Health Protection (Coronavirus, Restrictions) (No. 3) and (All Tiers) (England) (Amendment) Regulations 2021	2021 No.8	5 January 2021	Within the second tier restrictions, imposes a new national lockdown in England by moving all areas to the highest possible tier and tightening the restrictions applicable to that tier.
School Admissions (England) (Coronavirus) (Appeals Arrangements) (Amendment) Regulations 2021	2021 No.14	8 January 2021	Extend, from 31 January 2021 to 30 September 2021, the period for which amendments to the procedural rules for school admission appeals introduced by the School Admissions (England) (Coronavirus) (Appeals Arrangements) (Amendment) Regulations 2020 (SI 2020/446) will apply.
Public Health (Coronavirus) (Protection from Eviction) (England) Regulations 2021	2021 No.15	8 January 2021	Prevents the enforcement of evictions against residential tenants, other than in certain serious circumstances, until 21 February 2021.
Health Protection (Coronavirus, International Travel) (England) (Amendment) Regulations 2021	2021 No.18	8 January 2021	Removed Botswana, Israel, Jerusalem, Mauritius and the Seychelles from list of countries from which persons traveling to England were not required to self isolate on arrival. Applied additional more restrictive measures persons travelling from Angola, Botswana, Eswatini, Lesotho, Malawi, Mauritius, Mozambique, Namibia, Seychelles, Zambia and Zimbabwe.
Health Protection (Coronavirus, International Travel) (England) (Amendment) (No. 2) Regulations 2021	2021 No.25	12 January 2021	Removes the United Arab Emirates from list of countries from which persons traveling to England were not required to self isolate on arrival.
National Health Service (Performers Lists, Coronavirus) (England) Amendment Regulations 2021	2021 No.30	13 January 2021	Amends the National Health Service (Performers Lists) (England) Regulations 2013 (SI 2013/335) to remove the requirement for medical practitioners to be on the England Medical Performers List to deliver the COVID-19 Vaccine.
General Pharmaceutical Council (Coronavirus) (Amendment) Rules Order of Council 2021	2021 No.26	14 January 2021	Amends the General Pharmaceutical Council rules to allow investigations and appeals procedures to proceed remotely during the COVID-19 pandemic restrictions and to allow for documents to be presented electronically.
Health and Care Professions Council (Coronavirus) (Amendment) Rules Order of Council 2021	2021 No.27	14 January 2021	Amends the Health and Care Professions Council rules to allow certain committees to operate effectively during the COVID-19 pandemic, allow documents to be served electronically and meetings to be held remotely.
Health Protection (Coronavirus, Pre-Departure Testing and Operator Liability) (England) (Amendment) Regulations 2021	2021 No.38	14 January 2021	Requires that all persons arriving in England from outside the Common Travel Area must possess a negative COVID-19 test.
Health Protection (Coronavirus, International Travel) (England) (Amendment) (No. 3) Regulations 2021	2021 No.47	15 January 2021	Imposes 'additional measures' on persons travelling to England from South America and bans flights from many South American countries.
Health Protection (Coronavirus, International Travel) (England) (Amendment) (No. 4) Regulations 2021	2021 No.49	18 January 2021	Arrivals into England from all countries (except those in the Common Travel Area) must self-isolate on arrival. Several classes of traveller removed from the list of people who are exempt.
Health Protection (Coronavirus, Restrictions) (All Tiers) (England) (Amendment) Regulations 2021	2021 No.53	19 January 2021	Makes a number of minor amendments to the lockdown rules.
Local Government and Police and Crime Commissioner (Coronavirus) (Postponement of Elections and Referendums) (England and Wales) (Amendment) (England) Regulations 2021	2021 No.52	19 January 2021	To enable a government petition submitted to a council between 16 March 2020 and 8 February 2021 to be treated as having been presented on 9 February 2021. Practically, the principal effect is expected to be to allow the London Borough of Croydon to process a petition that has already been gathered to allow a governance referendum to occur at the same time as scheduled local elections.
Charities (Exception from Registration) (Amendment) Regulations 2021	2021 No.55	19 January 2021	Extends, until 31 March 2031, a temporary exemption granted to certain religious charities from the requirement to the registered with the Charity Commission.
