= Death of Mohamud Mohammed Hassan =

Black British-Somali allegedly assaulted by South Wales Police

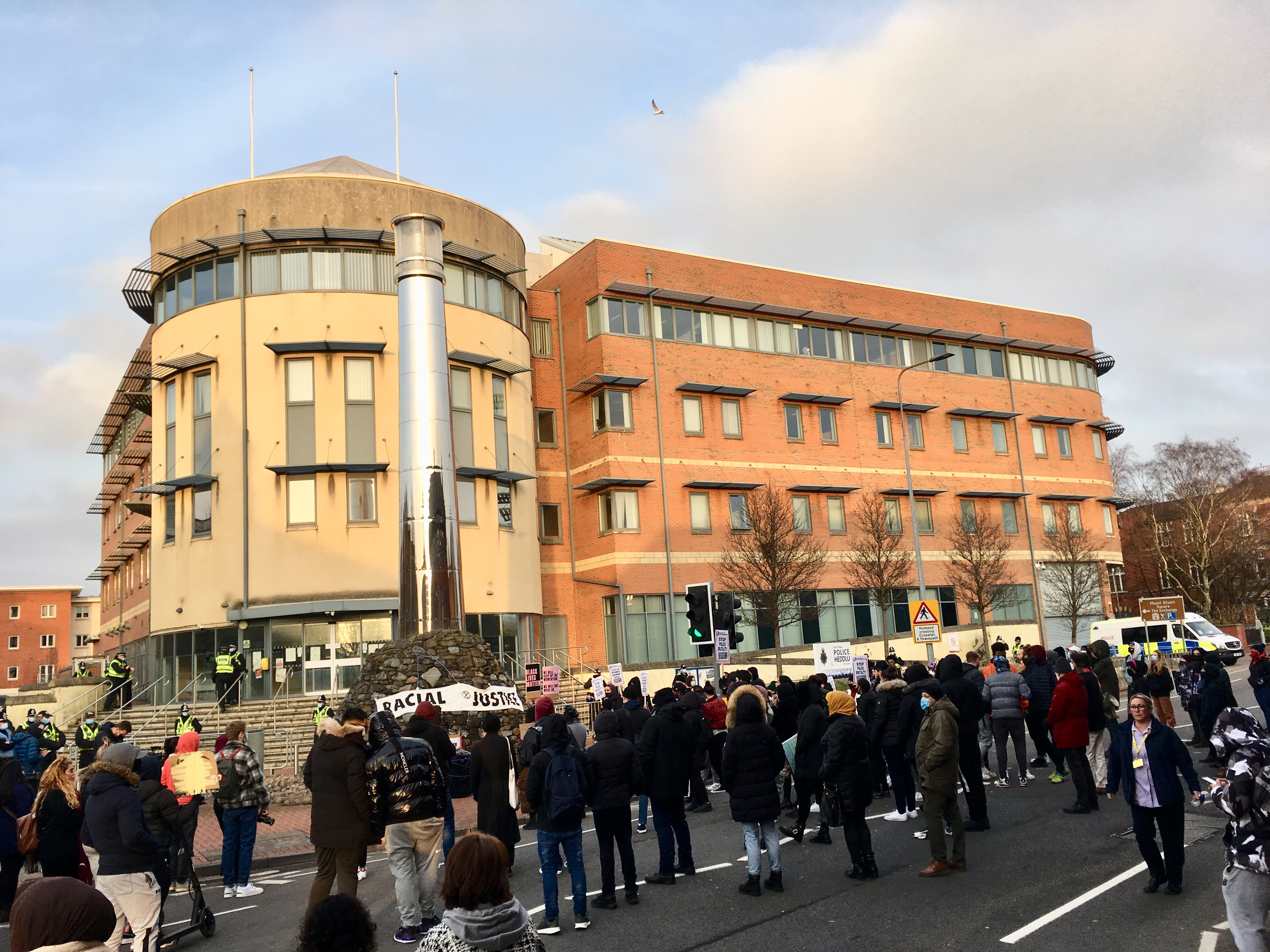
Protests at Cardiff Bay police station over Mohamud Hassan's death on 15 January 2021

Mohamud Mohammed Hassan (c. 1997 – 9 January 2021), a 24-year old British-Somali man, died on 9 January at his home in Cardiff, Wales, after being released from police custody earlier that day. He was arrested on the evening of 8 January on suspicion of an alleged breach of the peace, and released without charge the following morning. According to his family, and a taxi driver who transported him home, he claimed that he had been assaulted while in the custody of South Wales Police. An investigation by the Independent Office for Police Conduct (IOPC) and an inquest into his death both found no evidence that the police had caused or contributed to his death.

Hassan was arrested at his home on Newport Road in the Roath district of Cardiff on suspicion of a breach of the peace on Friday 8 January and taken to Cardiff Bay police station. He was released at 8:30 am the following morning, on Saturday 9 January, and officers returned to his home at 22:30 that evening. Hassan's aunt, Zainab Hassan, said that he was released by police "with lots of wounds on his body and lots of bruises...He didn't have these wounds when he was arrested and when he came out of Cardiff Bay police station, he had them". Zainab Hassan had not been present during the incident leading to Mohamud's arrest.

Hassan came into contact with 52 police officers in the hours before his death. South Wales Police said that there were no indications that excessive force had been used or indications of misconduct by officers. Police described Hassan's death as "sudden and unexplained", and referred his death to the IPOC. The police said that as part of their investigation "CCTV and body-worn video has already been, and will continue to be, examined...Early findings by the force indicate no misconduct issues and no excessive force". A police sergeant faced a disciplinary panel for alleged use of unnecessary force against Hassan, but was cleared of misconduct in November 2023.

== IOPC investigation ==
It was announced that the Independent Office for Police Conduct investigation would focus on Hassan's arrest, his subsequent journey to custody in a police van and his time spent at Cardiff Bay police station. It will be investigated "whether relevant assessments were made" before his release from custody, and the IOPC will interview officers involved in his case and witnesses to his arrest and subsequent movements after his release from custody. The IOPC director for Wales, Catrin Evans, said that "Preliminary indications are that there is no physical trauma injury to explain a cause of death".

The investigation came to an end in July 2022, and found that Hassan's time in custody at the police station "was not a contributory factor in his death". The IOPC recommended that a police sergeant face a disciplinary panel to answer for gross misconduct in relation to the use of force against Hassan at Cardiff Bay police station, specifically holding Hassan's head down to prevent him from spitting at officers.

On 8 November 2023, the disciplinary panel in Bridgend found the allegation of use of unnecessary force not proven, and supported the officer's account that the force he used was "necessary, proportionate, and reasonable". During the panel hearings, it was stated that Hassan had a cut to his face before his arrest, and spat from the window of his flat towards officers, who then detained him on suspicion on breaching the peace and placed a spit hood on his head. Bodycam footage showed Hassan kicking the police van and banging his head against the vehicle's panels.

Further details of the IOPC investigation were made public following the conclusion of the coroner's inquest in May 2024. The IOPC found no evidence that the actions of officers caused or contributed to Hassan's death, and also confirmed that there was no evidence to support allegations that Hassan had been assaulted by officers or mistreated on the basis on his race.

== Inquest ==
A pre-inquest review for the coroner's inquest into Hassan's death took place in Pontypridd in October 2022, during which the coroner declared that post-mortem evidence can "exclude a physical causal link between the actions of officers during the period of his detention and the cause of Mr Hassan's death". In May 2024, the coroner's jury delivered an open conclusion after hearing that no medical cause of death could be established and no "acts or omissions” by the police or paramedics contributed to it. The jury thus concluded that the "circumstances [of Hassan's death] were due to an unknown medical event".

== Reactions ==
The First Minister of Wales Mark Drakeford said that reports of Hassan's death were "deeply concerning and that the circumstances of his death "must be properly investigated" and that "Our thoughts must be with the family of a young man who was... a fit and healthy individual". Referring to the IOPC, Drakeford said that "The first step in any inquiry will have to be to allow them to carry out their work. I absolutely expect that to be done rigorously, and with full and visible independence". The leader of Plaid Cymru, Adam Price, said that "Every effort should be made to seek the truth of what happened".

Hundreds of protestors gathered at Cardiff Bay Police Station to protest his death on 12 January. Signs were held by protestors that read "Black Lives Matter" and the crowd chanted "no justice, no peace". Smokebombs and fireworks were thrown at police by protestors. The protestors demanded the release of CCTV footage of Hassan in custody. More than 150 protestors remained at Cardiff Bay Police Station on successive days.

The lawyers Hilary Brown and Lee Jasper are assisting the Hassan family. The pair had previously helped the family of Christopher Kapessa; his death had failed to be properly investigated by South Wales Police in July 2019.

Dylan Moore wrote in a post for the Institute for Welsh Affairs that the media reporting of Hassan's death represented "the truly alarming weakness of the media...when considering a case like this" as the initial statement from South Wales Police was "regurgitated" and reported by media "unchallenged and without qualification" with "the testimony of eyewitnesses...given secondary or no importance".

Bianca Ali was summoned by court for breaching COVID lockdown rules after allegedly organising a protest against Hassan's death that had more than 30 attendees. Ali is due to pay either a 500 fixed penalty fine or request a court hearing. Ali is one of the founders of Black Lives Matter Cardiff and Vale.

30,000 people had signed a petition in the month that called the IOPC to release documents and CCTV footage detailing Hasan's death.
