= E-40-07 =

ECSS standard

E-40-07 is the code for the ECSS standard titled Simulation Model Portability.

This standard builds upon the SMP2 standard version 1.2, released on October 28, 2005 by ESA.

The first issue of the E-40-07 standard was published on 2020-03-02 and is available at the ecss.nl website
