= Day One Support for Young People Trailblazer =

Former trial compulsory workfare scheme

The Day One Support for Young People Trailblazer (often abbreviated to DOSfYP) was a compulsory workfare scheme for young unemployed 18- to 24-year-olds, that was trialled in North and South London Jobcentre Plus districts, between 26 November 2012 and 26 July 2013. The workfare scheme whereby unemployed people must work in return for state unemployment benefits was introduced during a time of particularly high youth unemployment in the United Kingdom. As a mandatory scheme, claimants were sanctioned if they failed to meet the requirements of the scheme. The scheme differed from other workfare schemes which are generally aimed at the long term unemployed as claimants were forced onto the scheme immediately or soon after making a claim for Jobseeker's Allowance if they "had not previously completed six months of paid employment since leaving full time education". Claimants were mandated to complete 30 hours of work for 13 weeks and also had to continue to "sign on" during that period.

== Criticism ==
Adam Bienkov writing for Politics.co.uk said "Little thought appears to have been given to finding suitable placements, with claimants given just one day to accept unpaid work", and "overall those who failed to make it through the 13 weeks [programme] did much better than those who stayed".
