= United Kingdom responses to the COVID-19 pandemic (disambiguation) =

United Kingdom responses to the COVID-19 pandemic refers to the overall UK response to the COVID-19 pandemic.

It may also refer to:

- British government response to the COVID-19 pandemic
- United Kingdom legislation connected with the COVID-19 pandemic
