= SMPS (disambiguation) =

A switched-mode power supply is an electronic power supply that incorporates a switching regulator to convert electrical power efficiently.

SMPS may also refer to:

- Scanning mobility particle sizer, an analytical instrument for aerosol particles
- Stochastic Mathematical Programming System, an extension of MPS (format)

== See also ==
- SMP (disambiguation)
