= Maternity Allowance =

Maternity Allowance is a United Kingdom state benefit for women who are working but not entitled to Statutory Maternity Pay.

== Main conditions ==
Women who are unable to get Statutory Maternity Pay may be instead entitled to Maternity Allowance. This money is paid by the government rather than an employer. A claimant has to have worked 26 weeks within the 66 weeks before their due date, and have earned at least £30 a week for 13 of those weeks to qualify. If the claimant has not paid enough Class 2 National Insurance Contributions in this period, they will instead be entitled to a lower amount.

Alternatively, Maternity Allowance can be paid if the claimant has assisted a partner in the running of their business. Entitlement starts at the 11th week before the baby is due.

== Amount ==
Claimants will receive £187.18 a week or 90% of their average weekly earnings (whichever is less), or a reduced amount of £27 a week. It's paid for up to 39 weeks and is not taxable or means-tested. Nothing is paid for any day worked during this period.

== Effect on other benefits ==
You cannot get this together with any other Contributory Benefit or Jobseeker's Allowance. It counts in full as income for Income Support or Housing Benefit, but it is ignored for Tax Credits. If you cannot get Maternity Allowance you might get Employment and Support Allowance.
