= Statutory sick pay =

British social security benefit

Statutory sick pay (SSP) is a United Kingdom social security benefit. It is paid by an employer to all employees who are off work because of sickness at any length as of the Employment Rights Act 2025 (previously it was after 3 consecutive days), but less than 28 weeks and who normally pay National Insurance contributions (NICs), often referred to as earning above the Lower Earnings Limit (LEL). Days on which the employee would normally have worked are referred to as qualifying days; the first three of these, known as waiting days, are unpaid unless the employee has qualified for SSP within the previous 8 weeks and this included waiting days. Section 151 of the Social Security Contributions and Benefits Act 1992 requires employers to make payments. and, between 13 March 2020 and 25 March 2022, SSP was also paid from the first qualifying day if the employee was self isolating on medical advice relating to COVID-19. SSP is £116.75 per week for 2024/25. SSP is not paid to a number of categories of employees, including:

- Those who are paid less than the national insurance lower earnings limit - £123 per week for the 2023/24 tax year.
- New employees who have not done any work under contract of employment.
- Employees in receipt of Maternity Allowance or Statutory Maternity Pay (SMP)
- Employees recently in receipt of Social Security Benefits (within the last 57 days).
- Prisoners.
- Employees on strike.

If the individual is unable to work for medical reasons for longer than 28 weeks, entitlement to SSP ceases, but the person may be entitled to Employment and Support Allowance.

== International comparisons ==
The UK's level of statutory sick pay is currently amongst the lowest of all OECD countries. In September 2023 the Labour Party announced it would, if elected, reform statutory sick pay in the first 100 days of office, removing the three unpaid 'waiting days' and paying sick pay from day one, removing the lower earnings limit and increasing (to an unspecified amount) what people could claim.
