= SOTA Mapping Project =

Website providing geographical mapping tools

SOTA Mapping Project logo

SOTA Mapping Project (SMP) is a website (www.sotamaps.org) offering mapping resources for radio amateurs participating in the Summits On The Air (SOTA) awards program. It aims to provide comprehensive mapping information in graphical form based on Google Maps on summits included in the program, for participants in the program as well as for the general user.

The site is built and maintained by a small group of radio amateurs with interests in SOTA, hill walking and mountaineering, mapping and open source programming. They also maintain a similar site for the Islands on the air (IOTA) award scheme.

== Features ==
The site has five main mapping pages, each providing different sets of functionality.

=== Main page ===
This is the page most often used, since it is referenced directly by links from each of the SOTAWatch Summit pages. In addition to being able to view various SOTA Associations, Regions and individual summits, the page offers the exporting or downloading of such data in GPX (for import into a GPS device) or KML (for importing into Google Earth) formats.

=== Range page ===
The Range page provides tools with which the user can perform various distance-measurement tasks. The most often used of these is the "range" facility itself, which will find summits within a certain distance of some reference point. The user can input a central location in one of several forms - latitude/longitude, Maidenhead ("Grid") Locator, or an address or place-name - and can then choose one of three range-types within which the summits should be found:

- closed circle: summits within the entire circle will be found;
- open circle: by entering two different distances representing the radii of two concentric circles, summits will be found within the annulus formed by the two circles;
- road-route: the user enters a search radius, and defines the start- and end-positions of a route; then, by choosing one of possibly several routes found between those points, all summits within a corridor of width equal to the search-radius along the length of the route will be found.

All summits so found will be presented in a list and also on the map. Export of data for the summits found is also provided.

=== Tracks page ===
The Tracks Page allows the user to view, draw, or upload tracks or walking routes leading to SOTA summits. The three main sets of options are:

- View user-defined tracks on map - view tracks generated by users of the system.
- Draw track on map - using custom drawing tools, the user can draw a favourite track leading to a SOTA summit.
- Import track from file - the user can import a track (in GPX format) to a SOTA summit which he/she has recorded with a GPS unit.

Export of tracks data for the summits is also provided.

== Mapping tools ==
Each of the five mapping pages, in addition to their specific functionality, also features a set of map tools common to all. These are situated at the top of the map area in each of the mapping pages.

- Position - shows latitude/longitude and Maidenhead Locator at the mouse-pointer; also features a full dynamic Locator grid, showing greater detail as the user zooms into the map;
- Open Maps - allows the user to choose in addition to, and as replacements for, the standard mapping styles from Google Maps, one of two extra mapping styles provided by the open source mapping community: OpenStreetMap, or Open Cycle Map Normal.
- Day/Night - shows day/night shading and sunrise/sunset terminator superimposed on the mapping area. This is experimental, and results cannot be 100% guaranteed, but give nonetheless a very good approximation of the sun/terminator position.
