= Statutory Maternity Pay =

Form of parental leave in the United Kingdom

Statutory Maternity Pay is an employee benefit, part of the provision of parental leave in the United Kingdom.

== Main conditions ==
The mother must have been working for the same employer for six months continuously in the week 14 weeks before the baby is due, i.e. in the same employment when the baby was conceived. For the last eight weeks of that time earnings must have been, on average, at least the lower earnings limit for National Insurance Contributions, £120 in 2021. There is no obligation to go back to work after giving birth in order to qualify.

== Amount ==
The rate is 90% of average weekly earnings which is paid for the first six weeks. For the following 33 weeks the rate was £151.97 a week in 2021,) or 90 per cent of average weekly earnings if lower. The benefit can continue for up to 39 weeks altogether. This period can begin in any week from 11 weeks before the baby is expected to the week after the birth. If the mother is sick within 11 weeks of the due date for a reason connected with the pregnancy then maternity pay period begins from that week. The benefit is paid by the employer, normally in the same way as you are when are working. If contractual maternity pay is paid then the two will be combined. It is taxable. The employer can recover at least 92 per cent of the SMP they have to pay, and 100% for small employers.

== Making a claim ==
The claimant must give their employer notice that they intend to stop work because of pregnancy at least three weeks before they intend to stop. They also have to give the employer evidence of the date the baby is due. The Maternity Certificate form Mat B1 is normally provided by the doctor or midwife.

== Excluded groups ==
Self-employed women or those in legal custody when your claim starts do not qualify. The scheme does not cover the armed forces or certain mariners. A stillbirth before the 24th week of pregnancy then does not qualify for SMP - but could qualify for statutory sick pay.

== Residence requirements ==
The woman must normally live in the European Union. Benefit stops if she leaves the EU.

== Earnings rule ==
If the employee does any work for an employer in any week before the baby is born, she cannot get SMP from that employer for that week. She can qualify for SMP from more than one employer. Her SMP will stop if she works for any employer who is liable to pay SMP after the baby is born. If she worked on a self-employed basis during her period on SMP that would not affect her entitlement at all.

== Effect on other benefits ==
SMP counts in full for all means-tested benefits but does not affect widow's benefit (disambiguation)widow's benefits or benefits related to disability. A woman cannot get statutory sick pay, sickness benefits, jobseeker's allowance or carer's allowance at the same time as SMP, but might get income support or housing benefits, or more than before, if their income will be lower.

== Disputes ==
Decisions are made by the employer who must provide a written statement if they consider SMP is not payable.

Maternity Allowance is usually paid to women who do not qualify for SMP.
