= Jobseeker's Allowance =

Welfare benefit in the United Kingdom

Jobseeker's Allowance (JSA) is an unemployment benefit paid by the Government of the United Kingdom to people who are unemployed and actively seeking work. It is part of the social security benefits system and intended to cover living expenses while the claimant is out of work.

JSA is administered by the Department for Work and Pensions (DWP) in England, Wales, and Scotland, and in Northern Ireland by the Department for Communities. Claimants must be between 18 years of age and the State Pension age.

There is now one form of the benefit, based on National Insurance contributions, referred to by the DWP as New Style Jobseeker's Allowance or New Style JSA for short. The previous form of the benefit, which was based on income and had replaced Income Support for most customers in 1996, migrated to Universal Credit in March 2026. Universal Credit replaced Jobseeker's Allowance and other benefits for new claimants from October 2013.

To be eligible for JSA, claimants must state that they are actively seeking work by filling in a Jobseeker's Agreement form and attending a New Jobseeker interview (NJI). They must also go to a Jobcentre Plus every two weeks to "sign on", that is, to certify that they are still actively seeking work. Until 2020, claims for Jobseeker's Allowance were maintained by the legacy Jobseeker's Allowance Payment System (JSAPS).

== Legislation ==
=== Earlier history ===
Unemployment Benefit was first introduced in 1911 under the National Insurance Act 1911 to job seekers who had paid National Insurance contributions ("the stamp"). The maximum amount payable was seven shillings a week (equivalent to £36 in 2025). These payments were thus made only to people who had recently been in work, and not simply to those on low incomes. Furthermore, benefits were only paid for up to twelve months, by which time a claimant had to have regained work.

The Unemployment Insurance Act of March 1921 introduced a 'seeking work' test which required claimants to be actively seeking work and willing to accept employment paying a fair wage. In February 1922 a means test was introduced which excluded some, such as single adults who lived with relatives, from receiving benefit payments.

As a direct consequence of the return from war of injured servicemen, the Disabled Persons (Employment) Act 1944 was brought into force to enable these to secure employment.

After the Second World War, National Assistance was introduced by the National Assistance Act 1948 (11 & 12 Geo. 6. c. 29), allowing anyone of working age on a low income to apply for support.

National Assistance was replaced by Supplementary Benefit in November 1966, and Unemployment Benefit claimants could transfer to this after their initial entitlement had expired. Supplementary Benefit was later replaced by Income Support in April 1988.

=== Legislation ===
In 1995, legislation was passed through the House of Commons entitled the Jobseekers Act 1995. The Jobseeker's Allowance Regulations 1996 were produced six months after the act came into force, with the change of Income Support provision to Jobseekers Allowance occurring on 7 October 1996. The Social Security (Credits and Contributions) (Jobseeker's Allowance Consequential and Miscellaneous Amendments) Regulations 1996 were created, amending the Social Security (Credits) Regulations 1975 and the Social Security (Contributions) Regulations 1979, also coming into force on 7 October.

=== Subsequent legislation ===
in April 2011 Iain Duncan Smith introduced a period of mandatory work activity amounting to a maximum of four weeks of thirty hours each week in employment. It was expected this activity would be required of approximately 10,000 individuals. The main claimants who it was expected would be subject to mandatory work activity were those who had been 'signing on' for at least thirteen weeks. Despite this any recipient of Jobseeker-benefit could be required to take part in work activity regardless of how long that person had been 'signing on'.

At some time the Social Security Advisory Committee felt a need for an initiative so the Employment Skills and Regulations Scheme was considered. The governmental bodies had a look at the ideas and felt they were not altogether correct. So the government only accepted the need for two-thirds of the total of changes suggested. In 2011 the Jobseeker's Allowance (Employment, Skills and Enterprise) Regulations were brought into force. One part of the scheme required the long-term unemployed to participate in unpaid work activity for a maximum of six-months.

== Statistics ==
According to The Economist, in 2015 roughly 2% of welfare expenditure in the UK was spent on unemployment benefits; the bulk was spent in other areas.

The average number of claimants between the years 2003 and 2008 was 814,000 and average number of new claims was approximately 2,463,000. Nearly 40% of income-based claimants during 2003 were also claiming Housing Benefit. The DWP for England and Wales showed one third of the total number of claimants for JSA were persons having been convicted of a crime resulting in their act(s) having been recorded by the police authorities. In The Guardian newspaper in March 2001, the success of the New Deal scheme was reported; the report stated that 270,000 people were found full-time employment and the cost of achieving this end was half of the estimated amount. According to a report in 2008 by the Social Market Foundation there were approximately 100,000 long-term unemployed persons claiming JSA, at any given time. From 2010 to April 2011 the number of claimants having sanctions imposed increased to 75,000 persons amid claims that DWP staff deliberately made claiming more difficult and were required to refer 3 people a week for sanctions. The number of disabled people sanctioned doubled to 20,000 over the same period. The Department for Work and Pensions denied persecuting vulnerable people.

== Application methods ==
According to the UK government webpage on how to apply, application can be made online or by phone. Application can also be made on paper forms; JSA1, or JSA4RR if reclaiming JSA.

== Claimant Commitment ==
When claimants attended their first 'Jobseeker Interview', they were required to sign a contract with their advisor, called a claimant commitment. The contract can be changed at one-to-one interviews. Its terms include that claimants state:

- what activities they will perform to look for work
- The maximum commuting time they will accept
- The type of work they are ideally looking for (although claimants should be prepared to accept anything within their capabilities)
- How many times they will search suitable job search websites each week
- Whether they will use any magazines/newspapers to find jobs
- The maximum hours they are able to work, taking into consideration barriers such as health, child care etc.

Whether claimants are paid therefore depends on whether they uphold the contract they have agreed to – from a political theory known as Welfare Contractualism, first expressed in the 1998 paper "New Ambitions for our Country: A New Contract for Welfare".

at the heart of the new state will be a contract between citizen and government based on responsibilities and right

== Eligibility ==
Applicants qualified by conforming to all of the following requirements:

1. being 18 or over but below State Pension age. There were some exceptions for 16 and 17 year olds.
2. Not being in full-time education.
3. Living in England, Scotland or Wales.
4. Being available for work.
5. Actively seeking work.
6. Working on average less than 16 hours per week.
7. Attending a JSA interview after application.

=== Contribution-based ===
New-style (contribution-based) Jobseeker's Allowance (JSA(C)) entitlement is based on Class 1 National Insurance contributions in the two complete tax years preceding the benefit year of claim. This allowance is paid regardless of assets; however, any personal or occupational pension over £50 a week would result in deductions. There were also other caveats (related to job-seeking activity) which excluded payment.

Many older citizens seeking work could not receive payments, despite qualifying through NI contributions, because they had pension income. Self-employed people do not pay Class 1 contributions, and may not have been able to claim JSA(C) until their case had been decided. However, they were both still eligible for NI credits (see below).

JSA(C) may be claimed for only 26 weeks in any benefit year. In order to make a claim, a customer must have actually paid NI contributions for the same number of weeks in one of the last two tax years (the remaining 18 months could be either paid, or credited contributions). When entitlement to JSA(C) is exhausted, Universal Credit may then have become payable if eligible (see below).

Certain other benefits including Statutory Sick Pay, Statutory Paternity Pay, Statutory Maternity Pay, statutory adoption pay, Employment and Support Allowance, Bereavement Benefit, Carer's Allowance and JSA(C) itself also counted towards Class 1 contributions and were called "Credited Class 1 contributions".

If there was no entitlement to Universal Credit, a person could re-qualify for JSA(C) in a subsequent benefit year based on contributions paid in the relevant contribution years, providing that there had been a break of at least twelve weeks. They had to wait until the beginning of a new benefit year before they could claim again.

=== Income-based ===
People who were eligible for JSA(C) could also claim JSA(IB) for any additional payments due under that benefit (for family dependents, for example). JSA(IB) was payable only if the claimant had less than £16,000 in capital (correct as of May 2022). Payments are reduced if the claimant has savings between £6,000 and £16,000.

Both forms of benefit faced 100% marginal deductions if the individual earned more than a small amount – the 'disregard' – which was £5 per week for single people, £10 per week for couples and £20 per week for certain other groups such as some lone parents and disabled people. The 'disregard' remained at the same nominal amount since the 1980s and was never uprated with inflation, unlike benefits themselves. The benefit was withdrawn from those working 16 or more hours a week (though this did not apply to voluntary work). Part-time students could claim provided they did not have more than 16 hours a week in teacher contact time and the course was not officially designated as full-time by the college (irrespective of the number of hours of contact time).

== Work programmes ==
=== New Deal ===
Starting in 2001, the New Deal introduced a second stage to the claim period. Initially, there was the jobseeker's agreement and allowance. If a claimant who was below the female state pension was unemployed for over twelve months, they were placed on the New Deal scheme. They may also have entered the New Deal process early if they fell in special categories. From 2009, a Flexible New Deal scheme started using the private sector to provide tailored employment and skills support, with return-to-work performance incentives for the providers.

In Northern Ireland the New Deal was replaced in 2008 by a similar scheme known as Steps to Work. This scheme was administered by the Department for Employment and Learning which operates Jobs & Benefits Offices jointly with the Social Security Agency.

During October 2009 the New Deal programmes were replaced by the Flexible New Deal programmes, which were available to claimants still unemployed after a period of twelve months.

=== The Work Programme ===
Various work programmes, under the collective label of "New Deal" (including Flexible New Deal, New Deal for Young People, New Deal 25+, New Deal for Disabled people, New Deal for Lone parents, Pathways to Work, Progress2Work and Employment Zones), were replaced by The Work Programme during June 2011. On 6 March 2012 the UK Government announced benefits changes for prisoners at the end of their sentence and those claiming JSA. They would be sent on the work programme, as would JSA claimants who had been claiming for the previous 26 weeks. On the work programme they were required to sign a form to agree to 30 hours a week of unpaid work or face sanctions of 6 months. Unlike New Deal there was no choice of training or help setting up a business, nor could the job seeker choose what type of unpaid work they did. In nearly all cases the unpaid placement involved shop work. From 2012, work placement advisors would receive £5,600 should they find work for a person leaving prison who keeps the job for two years. According to the Government, from June 2011 only 1 in 5 participants in the Work Programme remained off benefits for over six months.

== Pensioners ==
Until 2020, men who reached the women's State Pension age had two options. They could still claim Jobseeker's Allowance, but had to remain actively seeking work. They would continue to receive the contribution-based rate of JSA if they were claiming it.

Alternatively, a man on a low income could apply for Pension Credit on reaching the women's state pension age. This replaced Jobseeker's Allowance payments and he would no longer need to "sign on" at the JobCentre. In both cases, the amount of benefit paid was the same (an additional Pensioner Premium was added to Income-based JSA).

National Insurance credits were paid by the Government on his behalf, even if he claimed another benefit; this came to an end in 2016, with the new State Pension.

Women could only claim until they reached the State Pension age; this increased gradually between 2010 and 2020. The State Pension age is now 66 for both men and women, as of 2020.

All customers must move from JSA to either State Pension, or Pension Credit (if eligible) at the State Pension age. A special part-week payment of State Pension is paid for the benefit week including the customer's birthday, making the claim continuous.

== Sanctioning ==
A claimant's Jobseeker's Allowance may be stopped as a punishment. A person choosing to remain out of employment should a vacancy be available is obliged to give a "good reason" for the choice or their monies are to be withheld. The Work and Pensions Committee of the House of Commons discovered single parents, care leavers and claimants with health problems and disabilities were "disproportionately vulnerable" to, and impacted by, sanctions. There was an excessive human cost. Children could become "collateral damage" since parents losing benefits affects them. Examples of "extreme hardship and distress" included a wheelchair user who "sofa-surfed" or slept in a college library for a year when her whole benefit was wrongly withdrawn. A man was sanctioned because he missed a job centre appointment three days after he went to hospital with severe epileptic seizures. The committee found the impact of sanctions had not been properly evaluated and was "pointlessly cruel".

Other reasons to be denied money are:

- Not being available for or actively seeking work or not signing the Jobseeker's Agreement: if a claimant does not declare on the Jobseeker's Agreement that they are available for and actively seeking work and sign the Agreement, the benefit will be suspended until the claimant completes and signs the agreement. Once the agreement has been signed, a decision maker will decide how much of the claim should be backdated, if any.
- Failing to attend a Jobcentre appointment: the claimant may be docked 4 or 13 weeks' income.
- Voluntarily leaving work or refusing a notified vacancy: The claimant may be sanctioned for up to 13 weeks' or 26 weeks' income in the case of repeated transgressions.
- Refusing to attend compulsory scheme or failing to comply with a direction: A punishment of 4 weeks' loss of income for the first instance and 13 weeks' for second and subsequent instances.
- Not accepting or keeping to the Claimant Commitment
- Not going to a Jobcentre Plus when asked.
- Turning down a job or training course.
- Not applying for any jobs the claimant is told about.
- Not taking part in any interviews the claimant is invited to.
- Not going to any training booked for the claimant or not taking part in employment schemes.
- Leaving the last job or training without good reason or because of the claimant's behaviour.

=== Criticism of sanctions ===
Sanctions have been found to be ineffective in getting claimants into work but do great harm to the claimants, especially to disabled claimants who are disproportionately targeted with sanctions.

The charity Oxfam oppose what they consider unfair sanctions:

We [Oxfam] have spoken to people who have had delays and sanctions for mundane reasons, such as not having the right ink to fill an application or missing appointments due to sickness which is unacceptable. Any sanctions system needs to operate in a way that does not push people further into poverty. People need support not punishment. They need understanding not condemnation.

The Guardian has listed ten cases of stopped benefits which it regards as either for "trivial reasons" or due to DWP "administrative errors". The former included three people who were in hospital due to their own sickness or attending a sick partner and a person who went for a job interview instead of attending the job centre. The latter included letters sent by the DWP to the wrong address and people who arrived on time at the job centre but found an unusually long queue. The Independent cited a man who had a heart attack during a work capability assessment and was sanctioned for not completing it. Two cases show reasonably foreseeable consequences for sanctioned diabetic claimants: one resorted to begging for food, whilst another who was apparently unable to afford to keep his insulin properly refrigerated was found dead, leading to a parliamentary select committee investigation of sanctions. In the last quarter of 2013 there were 227,629 claimants sanctioned, a rise of 69,600 compared to the equivalent time in 2012. Over a million British claimants were sanctioned between October 2012 and December 2013. 633,000 got their benefits back after referral and 580,273 referrals were cancelled. Even when benefits are restored on appeal the stress sanctions cause can worsen mental health.

Paul Jenkins, chief executive of the Tavistock and Portman NHS Foundation Trust, who previously worked for Rethink Mental Illness, criticised the reintroduction of sanctions, which were suspended in March 2020 because of the COVID-19 pandemic in the United Kingdom. He said benefit sanctions policy was "really cruel and ineffective".

==== Alleged pressure on job centre staff ====
According to Patrick Wintour in The Guardian, job centre staff were threatened they would be disciplined and given targets because it was felt too few claimants were sanctioned. Statistics are kept about the proportion of claimants sanctioned at each job centre and those with relatively low proportions of claimants sanctioned can face questions. There was reportedly a 'climate of fear' at job centres with staff under pressure to sanction innocent people to meet targets. Sanctions also harm the children of sanctioned claimants. Sanctioned claimants and their families sometimes need food banks to get something to eat. The government was urged to review the effects of sanctions in particular on claimants with psychiatric problems and disabilities. People with learning difficulties frequently have trouble understanding what is required of them. James Bolton of Mencap said:

Learning disability is often misunderstood or ignored by advisors and, as a result, essential simple adjustments aren't made to help individuals complete the tasks they are often unfairly set, or even help them understand what sanctions are. Instead, people with a learning disability have been sanctioned again and again for not completing tasks which they simply were not able due to their learning disability.

== See also ==
- Unemployment benefits
- Welfare (financial aid)
- Workfare
