= Simulation Model Portability =

The Simulation Model Portability is a standard for simulation models developed by ESA together with various stakeholders in the European Space Industry.

The first version, also known as SMI standard, was implemented in SIMSAT and EuroSim, simulator infrastructures in use at various ESA locations. The second version, also known as Simulation Modelling Platform - SMP2, is currently at version 1.2. It is implemented in several Space Simulators such as Basiles (CNES) or SimTG (AIRBUS D&S)

The ECSS has now taken the lead for further iterations of the SMP2 standard. At first, it has been published as a Technical Memorandum ECSS-E-TM-40-07 and in 2020 it become the ECSS standard ECSS-E-ST-40-07. The first implementations have already been released by several stakeholders in the European Space Industry. Simulations models have already been exchanged, using the new ECSS SMP between SIMULUS (ESA) and SimTG (AIRBUS D&S) simulators.

An update of the ECSS SMP E-40-07 is currently ongoing to specify the exchanged artefacts; called ECSS SMP Level 2 used to instantiate, configure and schedule a model execution. It is a collection of XSD files that define the model exchange format.
