= Margaret Laird =

Margaret Laird is the name of:

- Margaret B. Laird (1871–1968), leader in the women's suffrage movement in New Jersey
- Margaret Heather Laird (1933–2014), British teacher and senior laywoman in the Church of England
- Margaret Nicholl Laird (1897–1983), American Baptist missionary

== See also ==
- Lesley Margaret Laird (née Langan; born 1958), Scottish politician
- Lindsay Margaret Laird (1949–2001), British biologist
