= Ruth Cohen =

Ruth Cohen may refer to:

- Ruth Cohen (economist) (1906–1991), British economist and principal of Newnham College
- Ruth Cohen (actress) (1930–2008), American actress
