= Patricia Hodgson =

British broadcasting executive (born 1947)

Dame Patricia Hodgson DBE
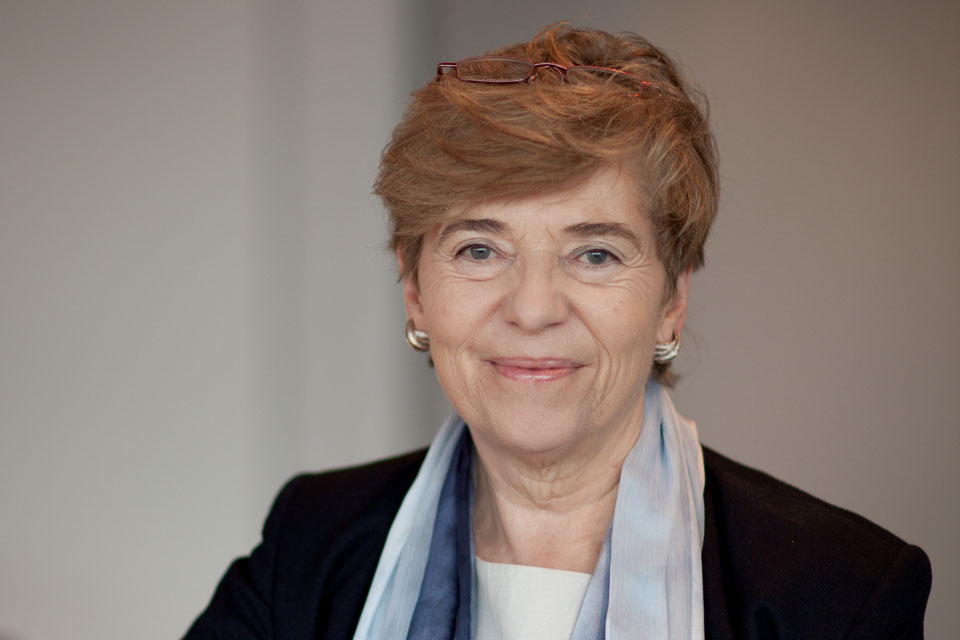

Chair of Ofcom
- In office 2014–2017
- Preceded by: Dame Colette Bowe
- Succeeded by: Terence, Baron Burns

Principal of Newnham College, Cambridge
- In office 2006–2012
- Preceded by: Baroness O'Neill of Bengarve
- Succeeded by: Dame Carol Black

Personal details
- Born: Patricia Anne Hodgson; 19 January 1947 (age 79) Essex, England
- Spouse: George Donaldson
- Children: 1 son
- Education: Newnham College, Cambridge
- Awards: DBE

Dame Patricia Anne Hodgson DBE (born 19 January 1947) is a British broadcasting executive, competition regulator, and academic administrator.

A former board member of the Centre for Data Ethics and Innovation and the UK AI Council, she served as Chair of Ofcom from 2014 to 2017. A Trustee of the Policy Exchange and Chair of the School Teachers' Review Body, from 2006 to 2012 she served as Principal of Newnham College, Cambridge.

== Personal life ==
Born in 1947, she was educated at Brentwood High School for Girls, a grammar school in Brentwood, Essex, before going up to Newnham College, Cambridge, where she graduated with a Bachelor of Arts (BA) degree, proceeding Master of Arts (MA Cantab). She also studied at the Royal Academy of Music, completing a Licentiate of the Royal Academy of Music (LRAM) in drama in 1968.

In 1979, Hodgson married George Donaldson. They have one son.

== Career ==
Hodgson joined the BBC as a producer and founder-member of the distance learning team for the Open University. Between 1970 and 2000 she worked in a variety of positions, moving from production onto the executive Board (see below). She served as a part-time Member of the Mergers and Monopolies Commission between 1993–99 and returned as a non-executive Member of the Competition Commission (the successor body) between 2004 and 2011. From September 2000 to the end of 2003, Hodgson was Chief Executive of the Independent Television Commission and led the organisation into the integrated telecoms regulator, Ofcom, where she was chairman from 2014 to 2017.

Hodgson's non-executive roles include Director of GCapMedia plc (2004–06), member of the BBC Trust (2006–2011), Chair of the Higher Education Regulation Review Group (2004–06), Member of the Higher Education Funding Council for England (2005–2011), Member of The Wellcome Trust (2004–08), Member of the Committee on Standards in Public Life (2004–08) and of the Statistics Commission (2000–06). Upon leaving Newnham in 2012, she became Chair of Ofcom and Chair of the School Teachers’ Review Body.

From 1 April 2021, Dame Patricia will serve a three-year appointment to the UKRI Science and Technical Facilities Council joining the STFC Innovation Board.

She has been a non-executive departmental director of the Department for Culture, Media and Sport (DCMS) since July 2023, a non-executive director of the Competition and Markets Authority, for which she holds a board position, since February 2024, and is a member of the Science and Technical Facilities Research Council (UKRI).

=== Politics ===
Hodgson's first job upon leaving university was working as a desk officer for the Conservative Research Department. From 1974 to 1977 she served as a Conservative member of Haringey Borough Council. From 1975 to 1976 she chaired the right-wing think-tank the Bow Group.

=== BBC ===
Hodgson worked in production between 1970 and 1983 on arts programmes for the Open University, as a producer on Tonight and briefly as a presenter on the Today programme. She became Deputy Secretary of the BBC in 1983, quickly moving to become Secretary. She was subsequently Head of Policy (1987–1992) and then Director of Policy (1993–2000) a main board position. As Director of Policy & Planning, Hodgson developed the original concept for the BBC's international commercial television channels, including BBC World, now BBC World News.

Hodgson was responsible for Charter and Licence negotiations in 1995 and 2000 and also led the team which planned the launch of digital and online UK services between 1995 and 2000. In 2006 she returned to the BBC as a member of the new governing body, the BBC Trust, which took over from the Board of Governors on 1 January 2007. In 2010 she was appointed to a second term on the Trust. After being runner-up for both Vice Chairman and Chairman of the Trust in 2011, Hodgson stood down to take up a role on the board of media regulator Ofcom, where she became chairman.

== Honours ==
Appointed a Commander of the Order of the British Empire in 1995, she was promoted Dame Commander of the Order of the British Empire in 2004. Dame Patricia was elected an Honorary Fellow of Newnham College, Cambridge in 2012, and holds honorary doctorates from City University, London, and the University of Essex.

Academic offices
Preceded by Baroness O'Neill of Bengarve	Principal of Newnham College, Cambridge; 2006–2012	Succeeded by Dame Carol Black
