= Jean Floud =

British sociologist

Jean Esther Floud CBE (née McDonald; 3 November 1915 – 28 March 2013) was a prominent educational sociologist and later an academic. She was the Principal of Newnham College, Cambridge, from 1972 to 1983.

== Early life ==
She was born Jean Esther McDonald to working-class parents and went to primary and secondary schools in her home town of Westcliff-on-Sea, Essex. In 1927, the family moved to Stoke Newington, north London where she won a free place at North Hackney Central School for Girls, a grammar school.

She studied sociology at the London School of Economics (LSE) under David Glass, TH Marshall, Morris Ginsberg and Karl Mannheim. She graduated from LSE as a Hobhouse Memorial Prize winner in 1936.

== Academic work ==
Floud worked as the assistant director of education in Oxford (1940–1946), then returned to LSE and taught there and at the Institute of Education (1947–1962).

With A. H. Halsey and F. M. Martin, she co-authored Social Class and Educational Opportunity (1956). Her next book was Education, Economy, and Society: A Reader in the Sociology of Education (1961), co-authored with Halsey and C Arnold Anderson.

Social Class and Educational Opportunity gave evidence that the eleven-plus exam for grammar school entrance was unfair to working-class children. Floud wrote that "within wide limits, the educability of children is determined by the subtle interaction of the social influences of home and school". Their findings started a long debate on the value and fairness of the eleven-plus.

== Academic posts ==
In 1962 Floud was appointed as the second female Fellow of Nuffield College, Oxford (1962–1972). She was made an Honorary Fellow at Nuffield in 1983.

Floud was a member of the committee that produced the Franks Report (1957) which proposed reforms to ensure a more efficient administration of Oxford University. Her membership in this led, in 1972, to an invitation to become Principal of Newnham College, Cambridge.

Following her retirement as Principal of Newnham College in 1983 she was elected into an Honorary Fellowship of the college. She was made an Honorary Fellow of Darwin College, Cambridge in 1986 and also received honorary degrees from the universities of Leeds (1973), City (1978) and London (2003).

== Honours ==
Floud was appointed Commander of the Order of the British Empire in the 1976 New Year Honours. She turned down the offer of a life peerage from James Callaghan's Labour government.

== Publications ==
- Social Class and Educational Opportunity (1956), co-authored with A. H. Halsey and F. M. Martin
- Education, Economy, and Society: A Reader in the Sociology of Education (1961), co-authored with A. H. Halsey and C Arnold Anderson
- The Sociology of Education: A Trend Report and Bibliography (1965)
- Dangerousness and Criminal Justice (Heinemann, 1981), co-authored with Warren A. Young

== Personal life ==
Jean Esther McDonald was born in Westcliff-on-Sea, Essex. Her father was a cobbler and shoe salesman. Her mother was a shop assistant who suffered from frequent ill-health.

While at LSE she met Peter Floud, an Oxford graduate. The couple joined the Communist Party and married in 1938. They had three children: Andrew (1948–1982); Frances (b. 1952); and Esther (b. 1956). Peter died of a brain tumour in 1960; their son Andrew died in a plane crash in 1982.

After Newnham in 1983, Floud retired to Oxford where she died on 28 March 2013. During her retirement, she travelled and continued to serve on university committees. She also spent time with her friends, her books, her music, and with the families of her two surviving children Frances and Esther.

Academic offices
Preceded by Ruth Cohen	Principal of Newnham College, Cambridge; 1972—1983	Succeeded by Sheila Browne
