= Nigel Gray (author) =

Australian writer

- Born: 1941 (age 84–85); Aughafatten, County Antrim, Northern Ireland
- Occupation: Author
- Writing career
- Notable works: Skeleton in the Cupboard, Life Sentence, The Rebels and the Hostage, A Balloon for Grandad

Nigel Gray (born 1941) is a Northern Irish-born Australian author of books for both children and adults.

== Early life and career ==
Gray was born in Aughafatten, County Antrim, Northern Ireland in 1941, but a year later was taken to England and fostered out. After a troubled childhood and adolescence he spent ten years working in a series of unskilled jobs, including two years in continental Europe travelling from the Mediterranean to the Arctic Circle. He later travelled more widely, and was a member of a group called Non-Violent Action in Vietnam that went to South East Asia to oppose the American War there in 1967/68. After being released from prison in Thailand he was deported to the UK, and later in that 'Year of Revolutions' he was arrested in France, England, and Germany where he again was locked up briefly and deported. In the 1970s he worked as a photographer, and was exhibited in London and had a one-person exhibition in Lancaster. As an actor, he performed the part of Joe Malik in Ken Campbell's epic adaptation of Illuminatus in Liverpool and Amsterdam. The play transferred to the National Theatre, London, where Gray dropped out for personal reasons and his role was taken over by Bill Nighy. He migrated to Australia in 1988.

== Education ==
Gray went to Lancaster University as a mature student, graduating in 1971. He was awarded an MA in creative writing by the University of East Anglia in 1983, and a PhD in creative writing by the University of Western Australia in 2009.

== Literary career ==
Gray began writing performance poetry in the late 1960s. Several small collections were published. He went on to write stories for adults and then children, producing numerous picture book stories, children's books, adult novels and story collections, non-fiction, and a few songs and plays In all he published more than a hundred books. His books have been published in 25 countries and 26 languages. His most recent adult publication is His Story – A Novel Memoir – The Life and Times of Dick O'Toole, a memoir encased in a political history of the years 1941-1977. He has held three writing fellowships in the UK, and three in Australia.

== Acclaim ==
Gray has been highly praised by other authors and critics, including Kurt Vonnegut, John Berger, Malcolm Bradbury, and Edward Bond. He has won The Dickens Fellowship Award, and The Irish Post Award for Literature. Other awards and honours for his books include:

- Skeleton in the Cupboard: Shortlisted for the WA Premier's Award
- Life Sentence: Shortlisted for the Steele Rudd Award
  - The Weekend Australian Critic's Choice of the Year's Best Books
- The Rebels and the Hostage: Winner of the UK North West Arts Award
- Shots: Shortlisted for The Other Award, UK
  - Shortlisted for the Observer Teenage Fiction Prize, UK
  - Shortlisted for the Guardian Children's Fiction Award, UK
  - Children's Book Foundation Children's Book of the Year, UK
- A Balloon for Grandad: Booklist Editor's Choice, USA
  - ANSCC/CBS Notable Children's Book, USA
  - Library of Congress Books for Children Choice, USA
  - Children's Book Foundation Book of the Year, UK
  - Runner-up for the Mother Goose Award, UK
  - Featured in 1001 Children's Books You Must Read Before You Grow Up
- A Country Far Away: Winner of the Christian Media Children's Book Prize, France
  - Parents Magazine Best Books of the Year Award, USA
  - NSCC/CBS Notable Children's Book, USA
  - Children's Book Foundation Book of the Year, UK
  - IRA-CBC Favourite Paperbacks for 1994, USA
- I'll Take You to Mrs Cole: Winner of the Limburg Children's Book Prize, Netherlands
  - Shortlisted for the Smarties Prize, UK
  - Shortlisted for the German Young People's Literature Prize
  - Shortlisted for the Burnley Children's Book Prize, UK
  - Best of the Year: Federation of Children's Book Groups, UK
- Little Bear's Grandad: Winner of the Prix Chronos, France
  - Federation of Children's Book Groups Best Books of the Year, UK
- Little Pig's Tale: Shortlisted for the WA Premier's Award, Australia
  - Child Education, Best Books of the Year, UK
- The Frog Prince: Shortlisted for the WA Premier's Award, Australia
- Running Away from Home: Shortlisted for the APA Award, Australia
- My Dog, My Cat, My Mum, and Me: A Notable Children's Book, Children's Book Council of Australia
- Fly: A Notable Children's Book, Children's Book Council of Australia
- Full House: A Notable Children's Book, Children's Book Council of Australia
- The Grocer's Daughter: A Notable Children's Book, Children's Book Council of Australia
- The Flood: A Notable Children's Book, Children's Book Council of Australia

.

== Personal life ==
Gray married Yasmin Hamid in 1977. He has four children: Garthine (1963), Sara (1969), Jo (1974) and Sam (1981).

== Causes ==
Gray is a libertarian socialist, humanist, and atheist. He is a supporter of a number of causes including the campaign to free bears from bile farms in Asia, (for which he wrote and financed the publication of a children's picture book); and an educational charity in southern Africa (for which he produced 24 storybooks). He has sponsored children through Plan for more than thirty years. He is a past president of the Western Australian branch of PEN. Gray has also promoted children's literacy and encouraged emerging writers to develop their craft.
