= Newnham College, Cambridge =

College of the University of Cambridge

Coordinates: 52.1995°N 0.1077°E

Newnham College
- University of Cambridge
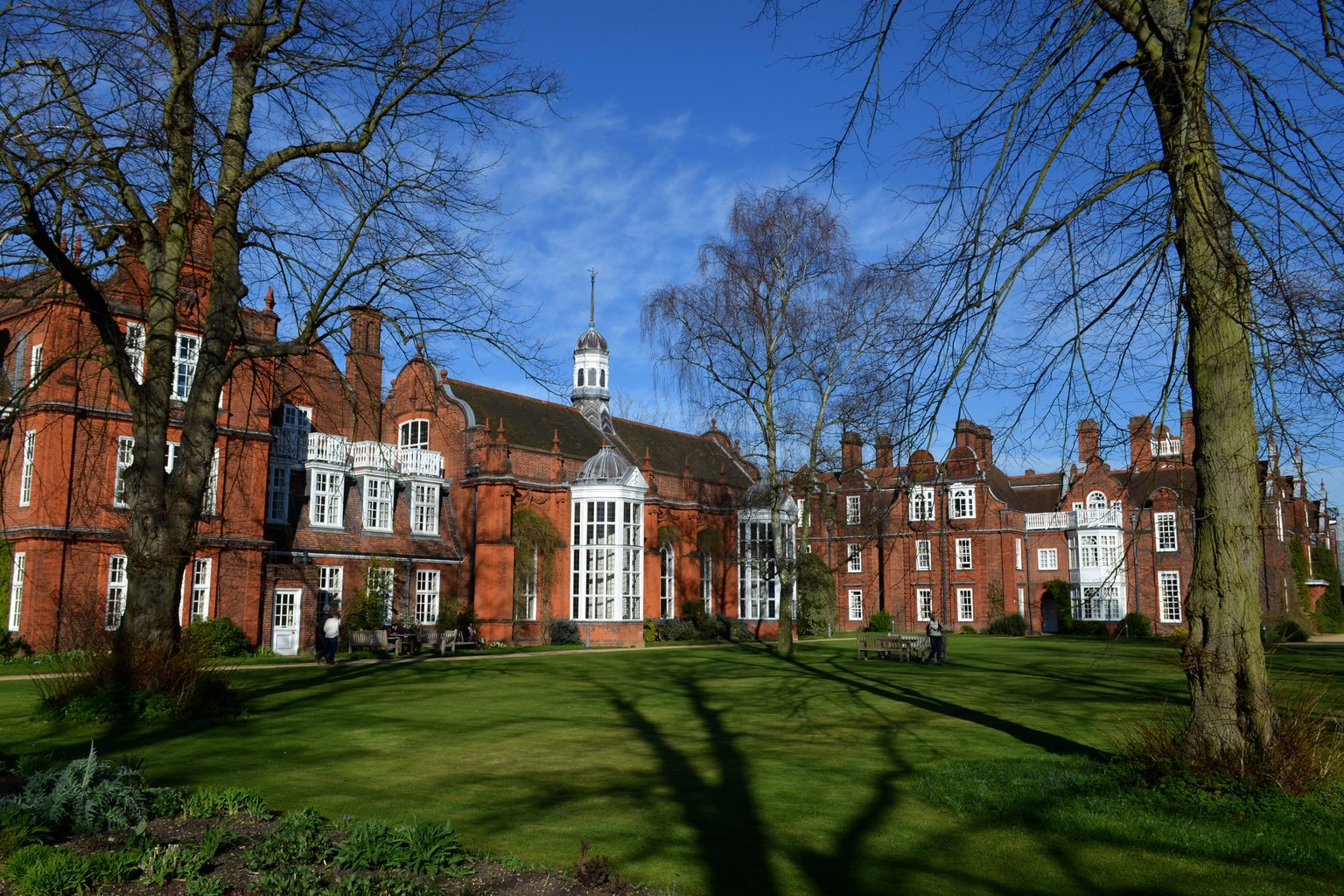
- Dining hall in March 2014

- Arms of Newnham College; Arms: Argent, on a chevron azure between in chief two crosses botonny fitchy and in base a mullet sable, a griffin's head erased Or between two mascles of the field
Scarf colours: grey, with a central broad band of navy, itself divided in two by a narrow gold stripe
- Location: Sidgwick Avenue (map)
- Abbreviation: N
- Founders: Anne Clough; Marion Kennedy; Eleanor Mildred Sidgwick; Henry Sidgwick et al.
- Established: 1871
- Named after: Newnham village
- Gender: Women
- Sister college: Lady Margaret Hall, Oxford
- Principal: Jacqueline Morgan
- Undergraduates: 422 (2022–23)
- Postgraduates: 300 (2022–23)
- Endowment: £79.4m (2024)
- Website: www.newn.cam.ac.uk
- JCR: www.newnhamjcr.uk
- MCR: www.srcf.ucam.org/newnhammcr/
- Boat club: Newnham College Boat Club

Map
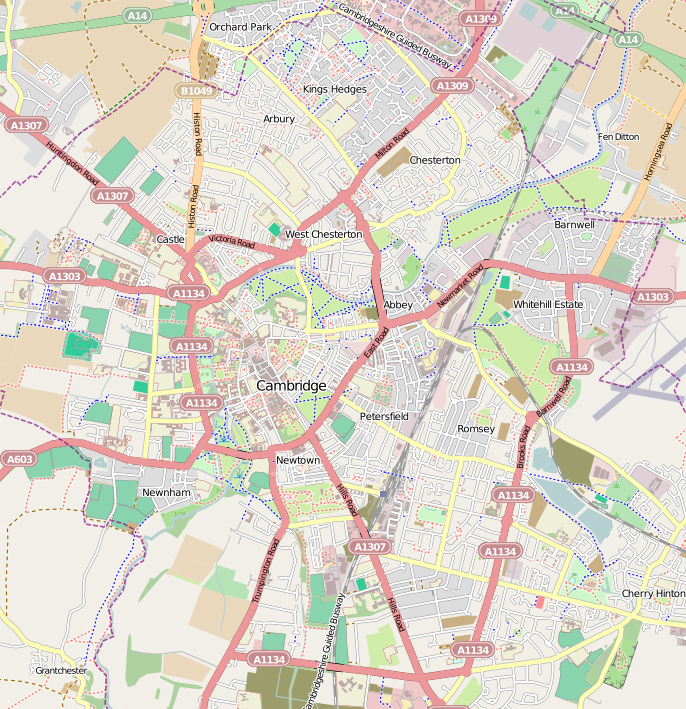
- Location within Cambridge

Newnham College is a women's constituent college of the University of Cambridge.

The college was founded in 1871 by a group organising Lectures for Ladies, members of which included philosopher Henry Sidgwick and suffragist campaigner Millicent Garrett Fawcett. It was the second women's college to be founded at Cambridge, following Girton College. The college celebrated its 150th anniversary throughout 2021 and 2022.

== History ==
The history of Newnham began with the formation of the Association for Promoting the Higher Education of Women in Cambridge in 1869. The progress of women at Cambridge University owes much to the pioneering work undertaken by the philosopher Henry Sidgwick, fellow of Trinity. Lectures for Ladies had been started in Cambridge in 1869, and such was the demand from those who could not travel in and out on a daily basis that in 1871 Sidgwick, one of the organisers of the lectures, rented a house at 74, Regent Street (Cambridge) to house five female students who wished to attend lectures but did not live near enough to the university to do so. He persuaded Anne Clough, who had previously run a school in the Lake District, to take charge of this house. The following year (1872), Clough moved to Merton House (built c. 1800) on Queen's Road, then to premises in Bateman Street. Clough eventually became president of the college.

Demand continued to increase and the supporters of the enterprise formed a limited company to raise funds, lease land, and build on it. In 1875, the first building for Newnham College was built on the site off Sidgwick Avenue, where the college remains. In 1876, Henry Sidgwick married Eleanor Mildred Balfour, who was already a supporter of women's education. They lived at Newnham for two periods during the 1880s and 1890s.

The college formally came into existence in 1880 with the amalgamation of the Association and the Company. Women were allowed to sit university examinations from 1881; their results were recorded in separate class-lists. Its name has occasionally been spelt phonetically as Newham College.

The demand from prospective students remained buoyant and the Newnham Hall Company built steadily, providing three more halls, a laboratory and a library, in the years up to the First World War. The architect Basil Champneys was employed throughout this period and designed the buildings in the Queen Anne style to much acclaim.

Many young women in mid-19th-century England had no access to the kind of formal secondary schooling which would have enabled them to go straight into the same university courses as the young men – the first principal herself had never been a pupil in a school. Thus, Newnham's founders allowed the young women to work at and to a level which suited their attainments and abilities. Some of them, with an extra year's preparation, did indeed go on to degree-level work. And as girls' secondary schools were founded in the last quarter of the 19th century, often staffed by those who had been to the women's colleges of Cambridge, Oxford and London, the situation began to change. In 1890 the Newnham student Philippa Fawcett was ranked above the Senior Wrangler, i.e. top in the Mathematical Tripos. By the First World War, the vast majority of Newnham students entered straight into degree-level courses.

A new Pfeiffer Building was built in 1893, largely funded by a £5,000 bequest from the poet Emily Jane Pfeiffer. In tailoring the curriculum to the students, Newnham found itself at odds with the other Cambridge college for women, Girton, founded two years earlier. Emily Davies, Girton's founder, believed passionately that equality could only be expressed by women doing the same courses as the men, on the same time-table. This meant that Girton attracted a much smaller intake in its early years. But the Newnham Council held its ground, reinforced by the commitment of many of its members to educational reform generally and a wish to change some of the courses Cambridge was offering to its men.

In 1948 Newnham, like Girton, attained the full status of a college of the university.

== Women in the university ==
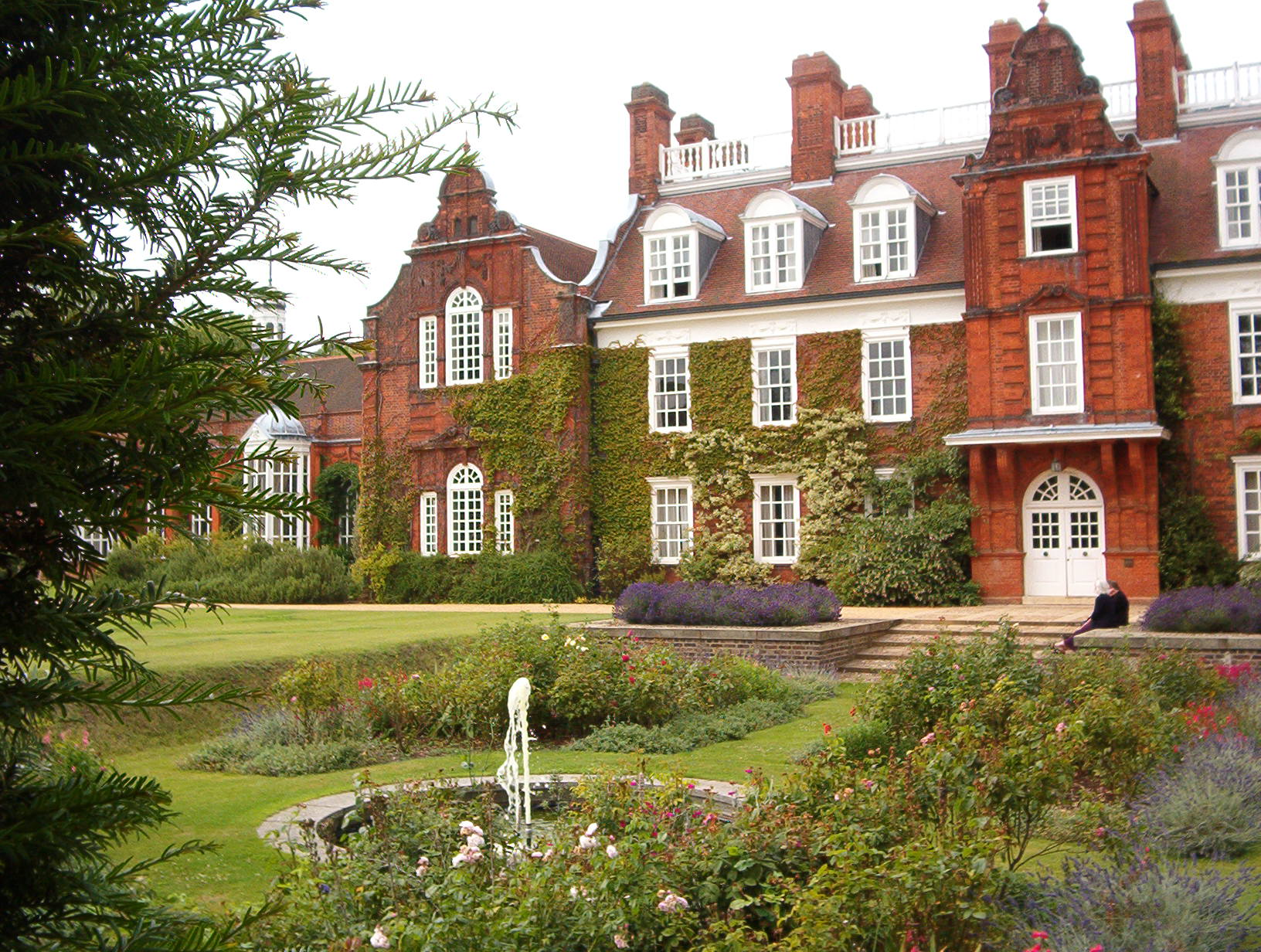
Sidgwick Hall and the Sunken Garden

The university as an institution at first took no notice of these women and arrangements to sit examinations had to be negotiated with each examiner individually. In 1868, Cambridge's Local Examinations Board (governing non-university examinations) allowed women to take exams for the first time. Concrete change within the university would have to wait until the first female colleges were formed, and following the foundation of Girton College (1869) and Newnham (1871) women were allowed into lectures, albeit at the discretion of the lecturer. By 1881, however, a general permission to sit examinations was negotiated.

A first attempt to secure for the women the titles and privileges of their degrees, not just a certificate from their colleges, was rebuffed in 1887 and a second try in 1897 went down to even more spectacular defeat. Undergraduates demonstrating against the women and their supporters did hundreds of pounds' worth of damage in the Market Square.

The First World War brought a catastrophic collapse of fee income for the men's colleges and Cambridge and Oxford both sought state financial help for the first time. This was the context in which the women tried once more to secure inclusion, this time asking not only for the titles of degrees but also for the privileges and involvement in university government that possession of degrees proper would bring. In Oxford this was secured in 1920 but in Cambridge the women went down to defeat again in 1921, having to settle for the titles – the much-joked-about BA tit – but not the substance of degrees. This time the male undergraduates celebrating victory over the women used a handcart as a battering ram to destroy the lower half of the bronze gates at Newnham, a memorial to Anne Clough.

The women spent the inter-war years trapped on the threshold of the university. They could hold university posts but they could not speak or vote in the affairs of their own departments or of the university as a whole. Finally, in 1948 the women were admitted to full membership of the university, although the university still retained powers to limit their numbers. National university expansion after the Second World War brought further change. In 1954, a third women's college, New Hall, (now Murray Edwards College), was founded. In 1965 the first mixed graduate college, Darwin College, was founded. The 1970s saw three men's colleges (Churchill, Clare and King's) admit women for the first time. Gradually Cambridge was ceasing to be "a men's university although of a mixed type", as it had been described in the 1920s in a memorably confused phrase. Cambridge now has no all-male colleges and Girton is also mixed. Newnham and Murray Edwards retain all-female student bodies, whilst Lucy Cavendish College started admitting men in 2021.

With the conversion of the last men-only colleges into mixed colleges in the 1970s and '80s, there were inevitably questions about whether any of the remaining women-only colleges would also change to mixed colleges. The issue again became prominent as women-only colleges throughout the rest of the country began admitting men, and following the 2007 announcement that Oxford University's last remaining women-only college, St Hilda's, would admit men, Cambridge is the only university in the United Kingdom where colleges have admissions policies that discriminate on the basis of sex.

== College arms ==
Argent, on a chevron azure between in chief two crosses botonny fitchy and in base a mullet sable, a griffin's head erased or between two mascles of the field.

These arms, granted in 1923, were designed by the Rev. Edward Earle Dorling to incorporate charges from the arms of those intimately connected with the founding of the college.

In the early years of the college Anne Clough was the principal. She was a member of the landed gentry family of Clough of Plas Clough, Denbighshire, whose arms are blazoned "Azure, between three mascles a greyhound's head couped argent". The out-students were under the care of Marion Kennedy. Her arms were "Argent, a chevron gules between in chief two crosses botonny fitchy sable and in base a boar's head couped sable langued gules" – slightly differing from the arms of Kennedy of Kirkmichael, which has crosses crosslet fitchy.

The other great benefactors of the college were Henry Sidgwick and Eleanor Mildred Balfour, who married in 1876. Mrs Sidgwick was vice-principal of one of the College's Halls, later becoming principal of the college in 1892. Their arms were – Sidgwick (assumed arms): Gules, a fess between three griffins' heads erased or; and Balfour (of Balbirnie): Argent, on a chevron engrailed between three mullets sable an otter's head erased argent.

In the college arms the chevron links them with the coats of Balfour and Kennedy, while its colour and the mascles refer to Clough. The crosses come from Kennedy, the mullet from Balfour, and the griffin's head from Sidgwick. No crest was granted, for although a corporate body may have a crest, it was thought that a crest and helm would be inappropriate to one composed entirely of women.

== College life ==
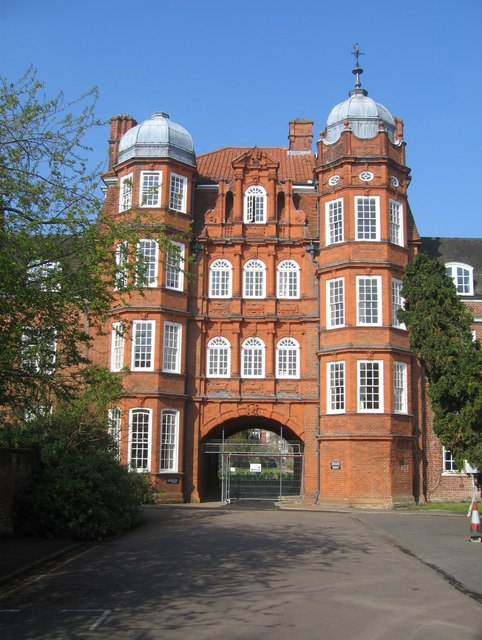
Pfeiffer Arch – the main entrance to the college before the Porters' Lodge moved to Sidgwick Avenue

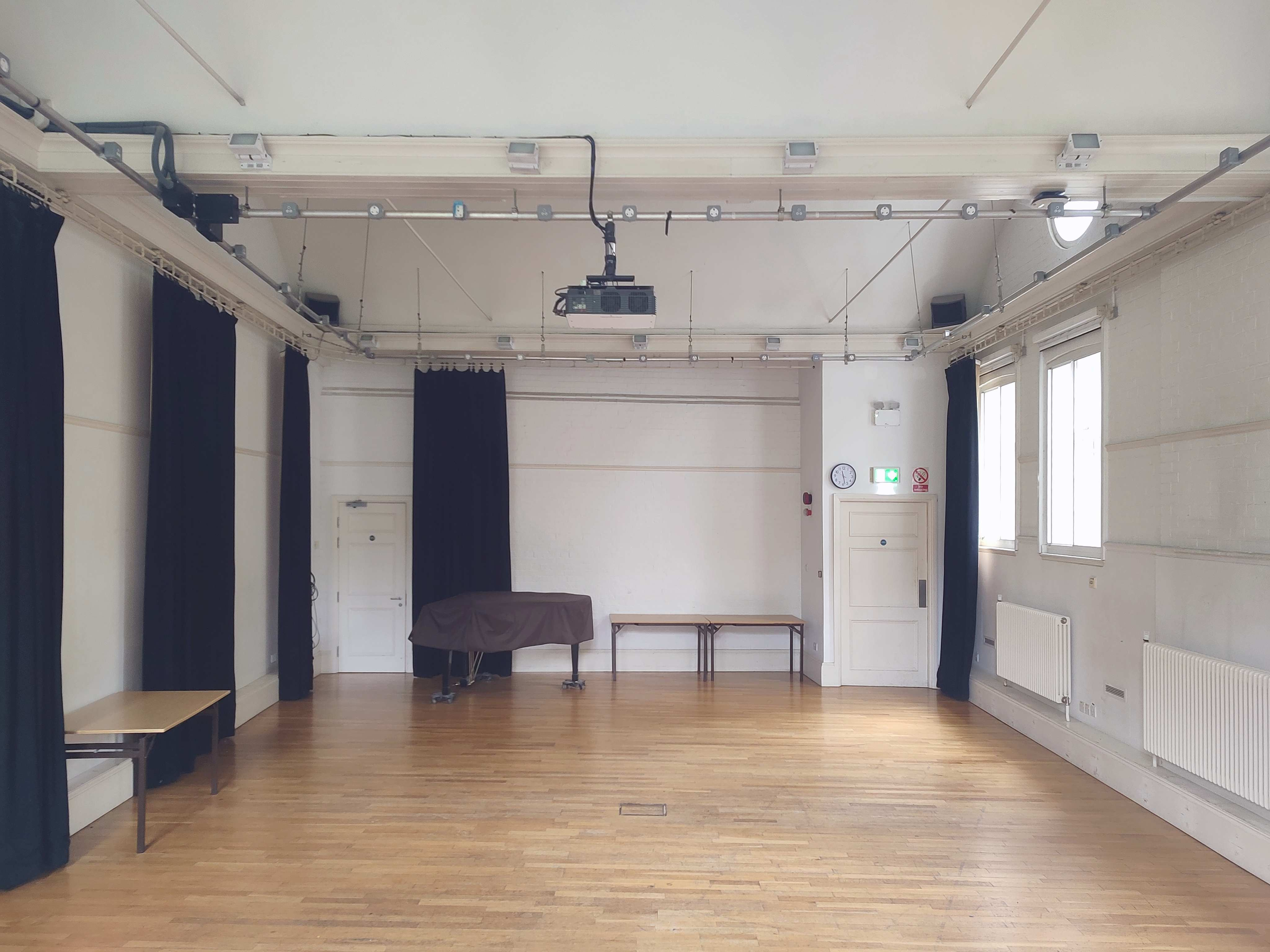
The Old Labs, converted from a laboratory to performance space

Basil Champneys designed what was popularly said to be "the second-longest continuous indoor corridor in Europe" in order to prevent the women of the college stepping outside in the rain. The laboratory, which can be found near the sports field, now houses a space which hosts a range of cultural events, such as theatre productions, music recitals and art exhibitions.

Alongside a formal hall, there is also a modern buttery in which to eat and relax. The College is also home to the Grade II* listed 1897 Yates Thompson Library and the Horner Markwick building. The library was originally Newnham students' primary reference source since women were not allowed into the University Library. The library was built with a gift from Henry Yates Thompson and his wife, Elizabeth. It remains one of the largest college libraries in Cambridge with a collection of 100,000 volumes, including approximately 6,000 rare books.

The college has two official combination rooms that represent the interests of students in the college and are responsible for social aspects of college life. Undergraduates are members of the Junior Combination Room (JCR), whilst graduate students are members of the Middle Combination Room (MCR).

Newnham has many societies of its own including clubs for rowing, football, netball, tennis, and many other sports, as well as several choirs. As Newnham is a non-denominational foundation, it does not have its own chapel. Choral scholars at Newnham form part of Selwyn College's chapel choir. Newnham College Boat Club was the university's first women's boat club.

== Principals ==
- Anne Jemima Clough (1871–1892)
- Eleanor Mildred Sidgwick (1892–1910)
- Katharine Stephen (1911–1920)
- Blanche Athena Clough (1920–1923)
- Pernel Strachey (1923–1941)
- Myra Curtis (1942–1954)
- Ruth Louisa Cohen (1954–1972)
- Jean Floud (1973–1982)
- Sheila Jeanne Browne (1983–1992)
- Onora O'Neill (1992–2006)
- Patricia Hodgson (2006–2012)
- Carol M. Black (2012-2019)
- Alison Rose (2019–2026)
- Jacqueline Morgan (2026–present)

== Notable alumnae ==
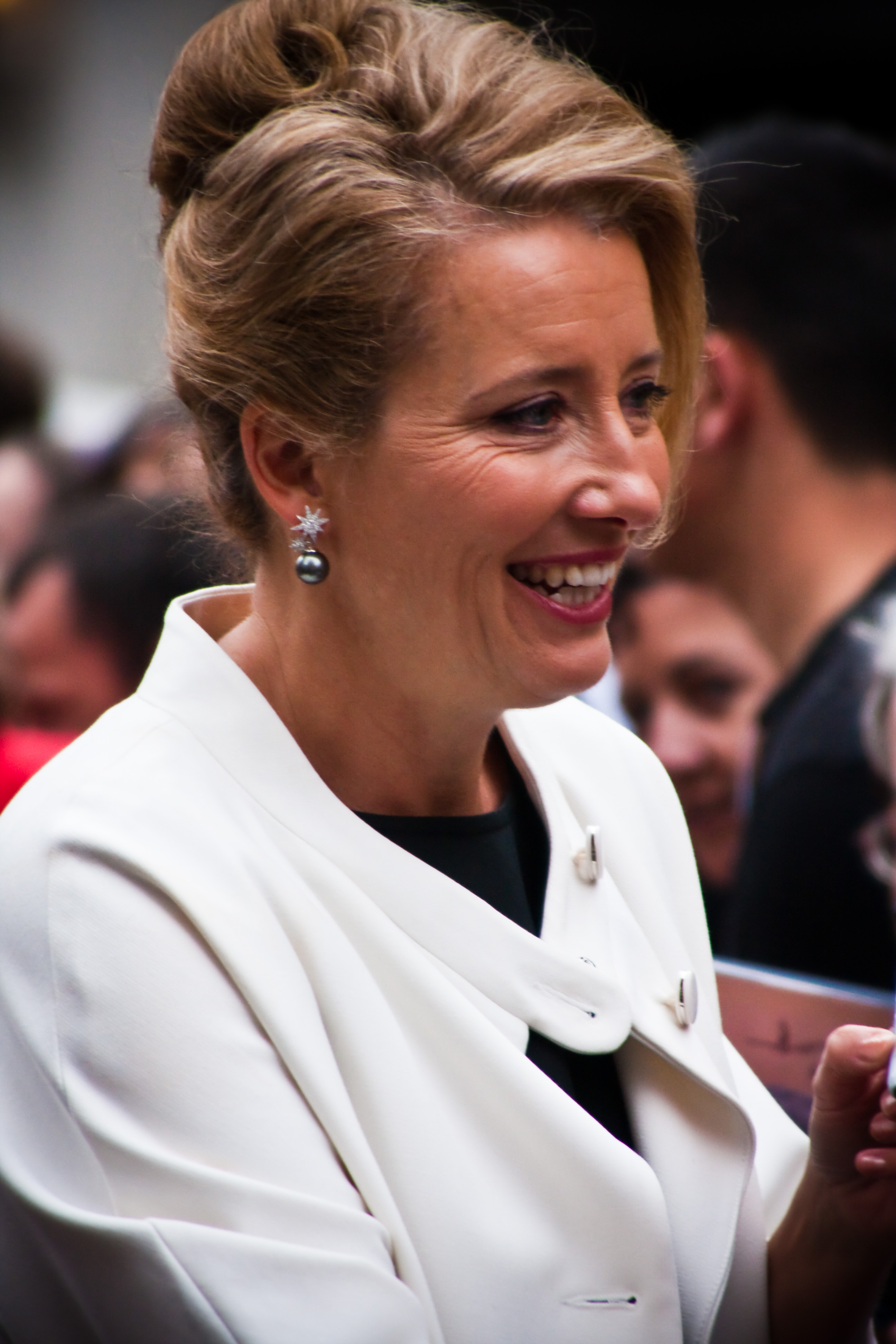
Dame Emma Thompson, actress, writer

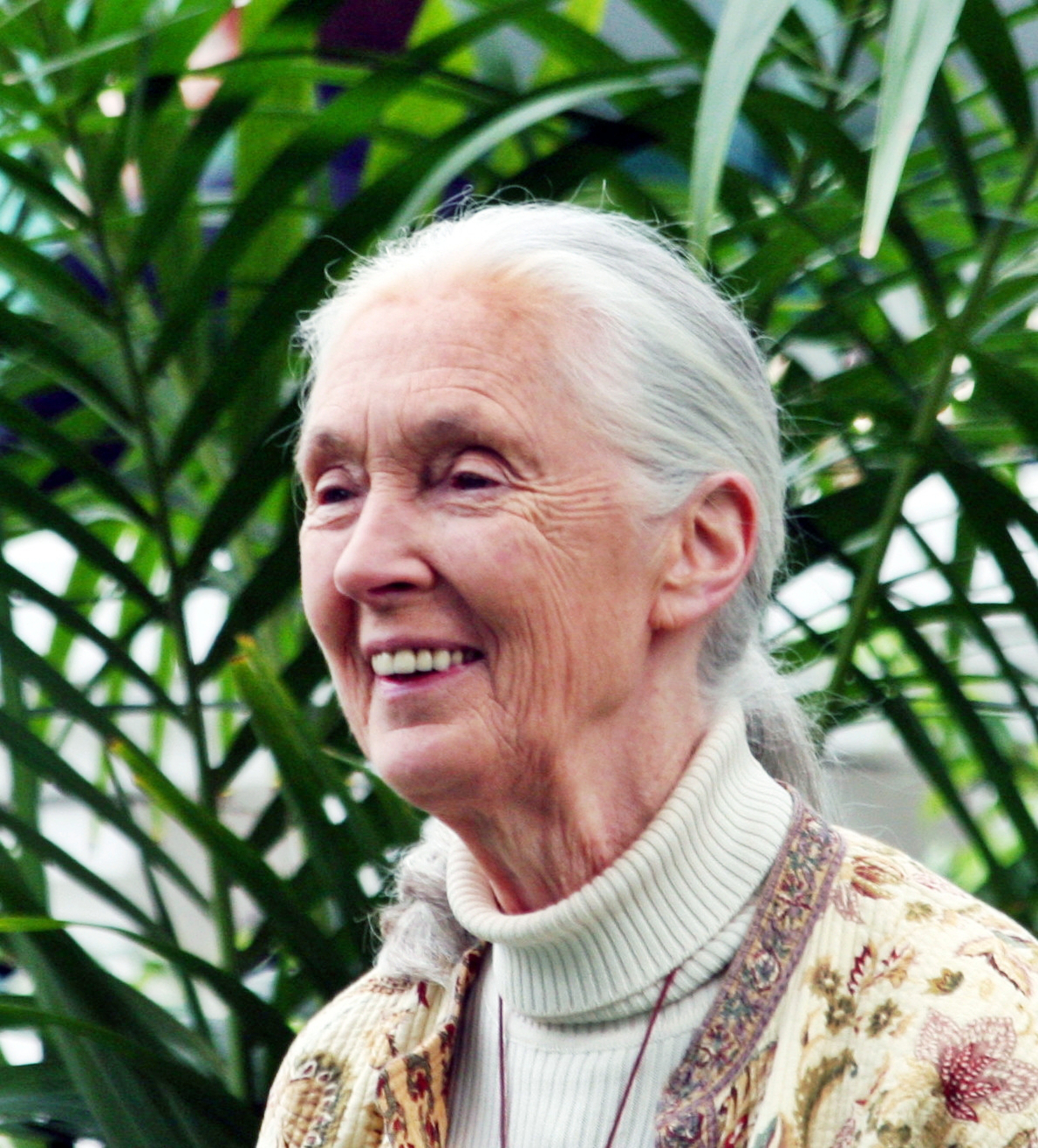
Dame Jane Goodall, primatologist

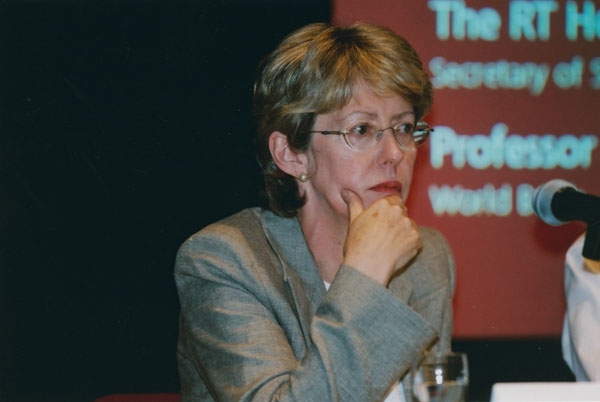
Patricia Hewitt, former government minister

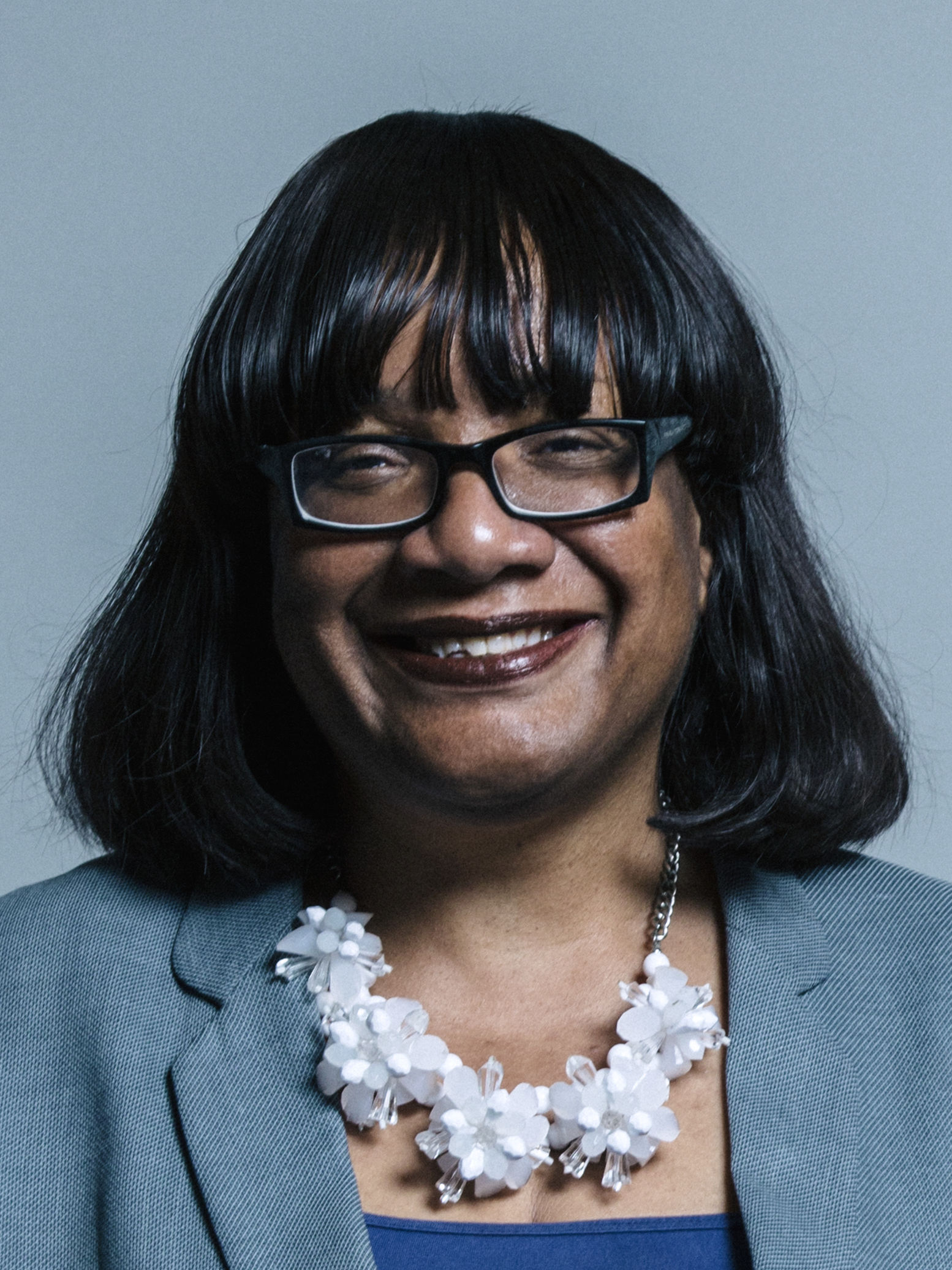
Diane Abbott, member of Parliament

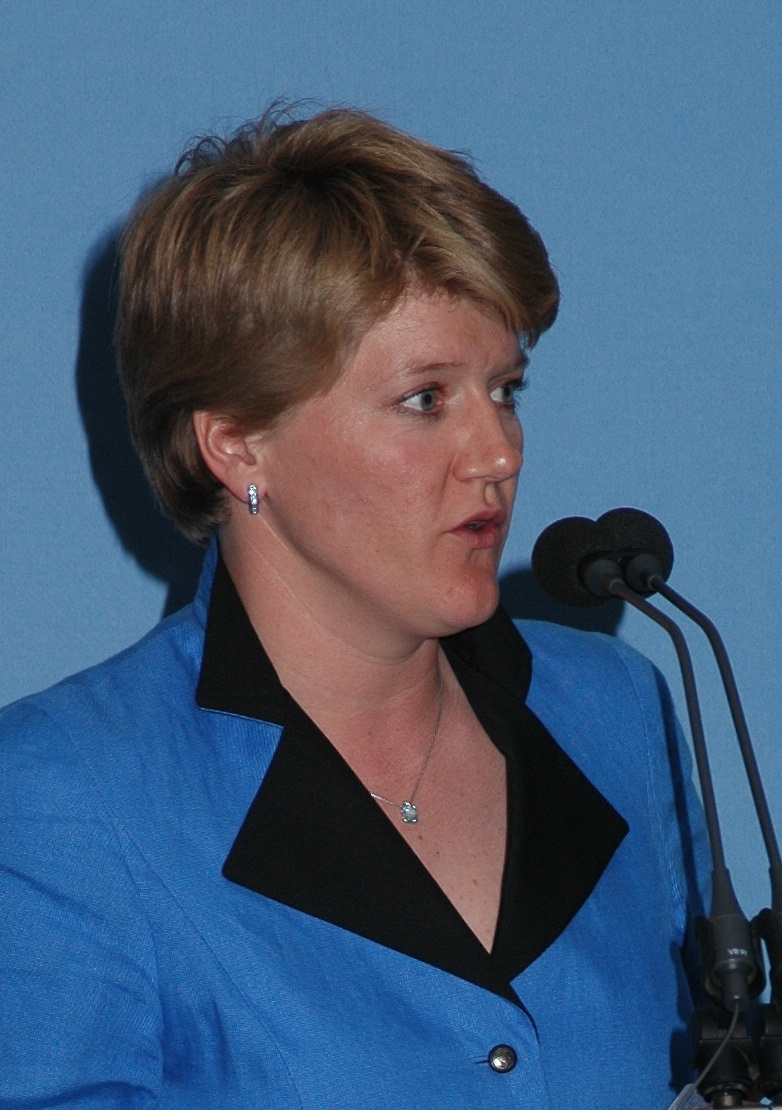
Clare Balding, television presenter

Name	Birth	Death	Career
Diane Abbott	1953		Politician
Pat Ambler	1936	2017	Roboticist
Alice Ambrose	1906	2001	Philosopher, logician
Dame Margaret Anstee	1926	2016	Under-secretary-general of the United Nations
Maggie Atkinson	1956		Public servant
Akua Asabea Ayisi	1959	2010	High Court judge and journalist
Mary Baines	1932	2020	Palliative care physician
Joan Bakewell, Baroness Bakewell	1933		Journalist, broadcaster
Clare Balding	1971		Journalist, broadcaster
Joanna Bauldreay			Fuel development manager at Shell Global Solutions
Lydia Baumbach	1924	1991	Classicist
Dame Mary Beard	1955		Classicist
Margaret Jane Benson	1859	1936	Botanist
Kate Bertram	1912	1999	Biologist
Dame Margaret Blackwood	1909	1986	Australian botanist
Mary Boyce	1920	2006	British Iranist, Zoroastrian specialist at SOAS
Claire Breay	1968		Curator at the British Library
Eleanor Bron	1938		Actress
Dame Antonia Byatt	1936	2023	Writer
Christine Carpenter	1946		Professor of English History, writer, editor and Ford Lecturer
Letitia Chitty	1897	1982	Aeronautical engineer
Joan Clarke	1917	1996	Cryptanalyst, numismatist
Dame Julia Cleverdon	1950		Charity CEO
Ruth Cohen	1906	1991	Economist
Edith Creak	1885	1919	First of five students here aged 16, headteacher
Joan Curran	1916	1999	Physicist
Ellen Wordsworth Darwin	1856	1903	Academic
Nora David, Baroness David of Romsey	1913	2009	Politician
Beryl May Dent	1900	1977	Mathematical physicist
Dame Margaret Drabble	1939		Writer
Sarah Dunant	1950		Writer, broadcaster
Patricia Duncker	1951		Novelist
Sheila May Edmonds	1916	2002	Mathematician, Newnham College vice-principal 1960–1981
Julie Etchingham	1969		Newsreader
Sarah Foot	1961		Ecclesiastical historian
Rosalind Franklin	1920	1958	Physical chemist, crystallographer
Dorothy Garrod	1892	1968	Archaeologist
Winifred Gérin	1901	1981	Biographer
Jane Gibson	1924	2008	Biochemist
Muriel Glauert	1892	1949	Mathematician
Dame Jane Goodall	1934	2025	Primatologist, anthropologist
Germaine Greer	1939		Australian academic, feminist writer
Jane Grigson	1928	1990	Cookery writer
Jean Grove	1927	2001	Geographer
Diane Haigh	1949	2022	Architect
Dame Patricia Hewitt	1948		Politician
Dorothy Hill	1907	1997	Australian geologist and palaeontologist
Dorothy Hodgkin	1910	1994	Nobel Prize in Chemistry laureate
Dame Patricia Hodgson	1947		Former BBC Trust member
Portia Holman	1903	1983	Child psychiatrist
Isaline Blew Horner	1896	1981	PTS president, OBE recipient
Gabrielle Howard	1876	1930	Plant physiologist
Louise Howard	1880	1969	Organic husbandry advocate
Rupa Huq	1972		Politician
Geraldine Jebb	1876	1959	Principal, Bedford College, London
Elizabeth Jenkins	1905	2010	Novelist, biographer
Lindsay Laird	1949	2001	Scientist, ichthyologist
Winifred Lamb	1894	1963	Archaeologist, curator
Penelope Leach	1937		Psychologist, writer
Judith Ledeboer	1901	1990	Architect
Gillian Lovegrove	1942		Computer scientist
Jessica Mann	1937	2018	Writer
Miriam Margolyes	1941		Actress
Margaret Masterman	1910	1986	Computational linguist
Suzy Menkes	1943		Editor of Vogue International
Brenda Milner	1918		Neuropsychologist
Alda Milner-Barry	1893	1938	Academic, vice-principal of Newnham College, 1938
Sara Mohr-Pietsch	1980		Broadcaster
Elizabeth Maria Molteno	1852	1927	Activist for civil and women's rights in South Africa
Dame Iris Murdoch	1919	1999	Writer, philosopher
Valerie Grosvenor Myer	1935	2007	Writer
Julia Neuberger, Baroness Neuberger	1950		Rabbi, member of the House of Lords
Prof Adetowun Ogunsheye	1926		Academic, first female professor in Nigeria
Cecilia Payne-Gaposchkin	1900	1979	British-American astronomer and astrophysicist
Dorothea Pertz	1859	1939	Botanist
Grace Evelyn Pickford	1902	1986	Biologist and endocrinologist
Jadwiga Piłsudska	1920	2014	Architect, pilot
Sylvia Plath	1932	1963	Writer and winner of the Pulitzer Prize for Poetry
Clare Pooley			Blogger and novelist
Marjorie Powell	1893	1939	Lecturer; first woman to be admitted to Lincoln's Inn
Clara Rackham	1875	1966	Suffragist and politician
Katherine Raleigh	1852	1922	Founded Newnham's Raleigh Musical Society
Vicky Randall	1945	2019	Professor of Political Science and feminist scholar
Amber Reeves	1887	1981	Writer
Dame Alison Richard	1948		Vice-chancellor of Cambridge
Audrey Richards	1899	1984	Social anthropologist
Edith Rebecca Saunders	1865	1945	Geneticist and plant anatomist
Liz Shore	1927	2022	Former deputy chief medical officer
Hayat Sindi	1967		Member of the Consultative Assembly of Saudi Arabia
Rosemary Anne Sisson	1923	2017	Dramatist, novelist
Ali Smith	1962		Novelist
Kamala Sohonie	1938	1998	Biochemist, first Indian woman to earn a PhD in a scientific discipline
Marjory Stephenson	1885	1948	Biochemist
Edith Anne Stoney	1869	1938	Medical physicist
Alix Strachey	1892	1973	Psychoanalyst
Dame Emma Thompson	1959		Actress, screenwriter
Judith Jarvis Thomson	1929	2020	Philosopher
Constance Tipper	1894	1995	Metallurgist, crystallographer
Claire Tomalin	1933		Writer
Anne Treisman	1935	2018	Psychologist
Michelene Wandor	1940		Dramatist
Anna Watkins	1983		Olympic gold medallist 2012
Henrietta White	1856	1936	Educator
Katharine Whitehorn	1926	2021	Writer
Olivia Williams	1968		Actress
Elizabeth Wiskemann	1899	1971	Historian, journalist

== In literature and film ==
- Newnham College is described in two of Virginia Woolf's works, A Room of One's Own (under the name 'Fernham') and "A Women's College from the Outside".
- In James Hilton's novel Random Harvest Charles Rainier's niece Kitty attended Newnham College.
- Newnham College appeared in the 2019 film Red Joan.
- ITV's detective series Grantchester set the first episode of the fifth series (2020) in Newnham, in a plot featuring the death of a student after a May Ball.

== Gallery ==
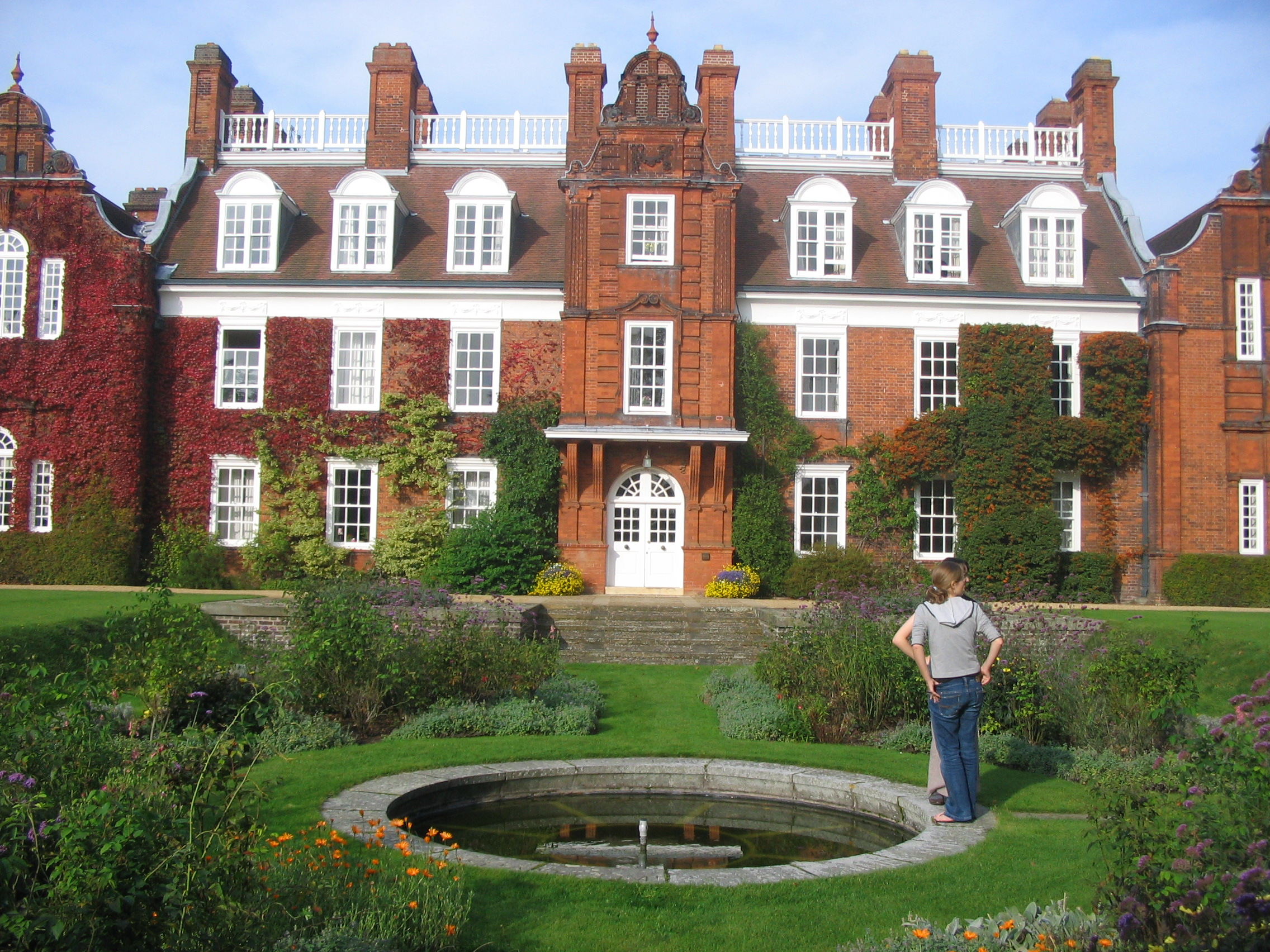
Sidgwick Hall and the sunken garden of Newnham College

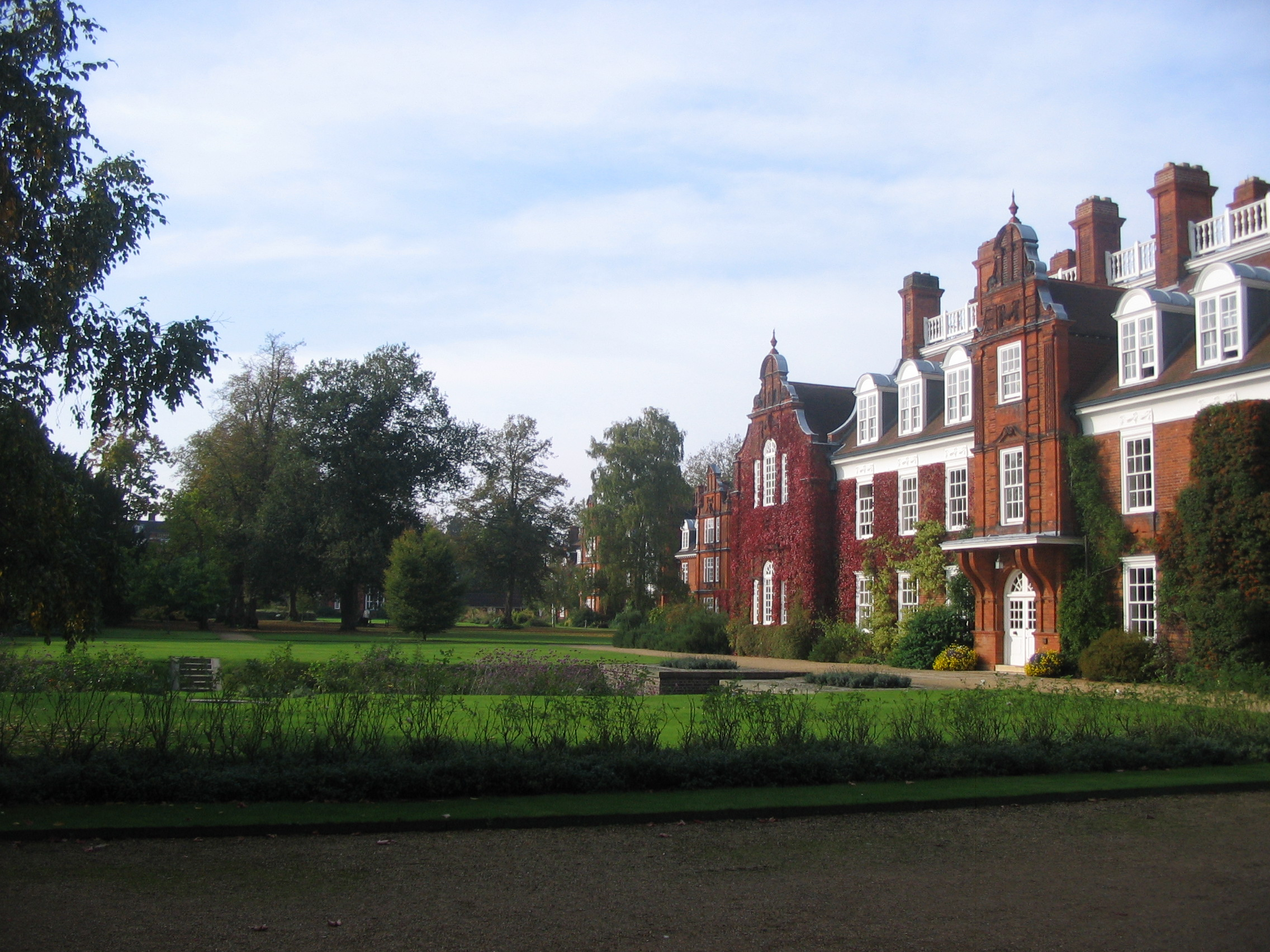
A view of Sidgwick

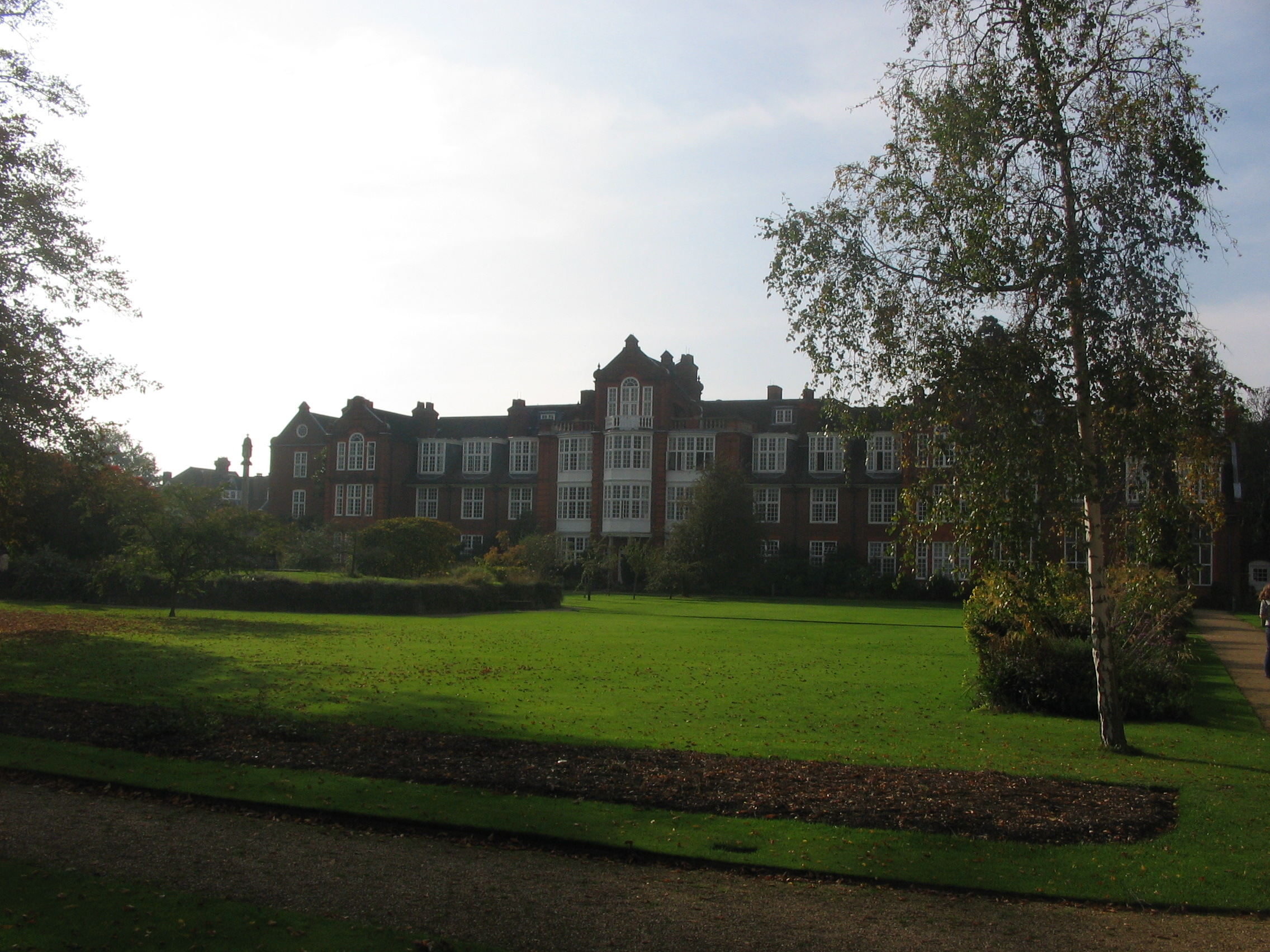
Peile Building

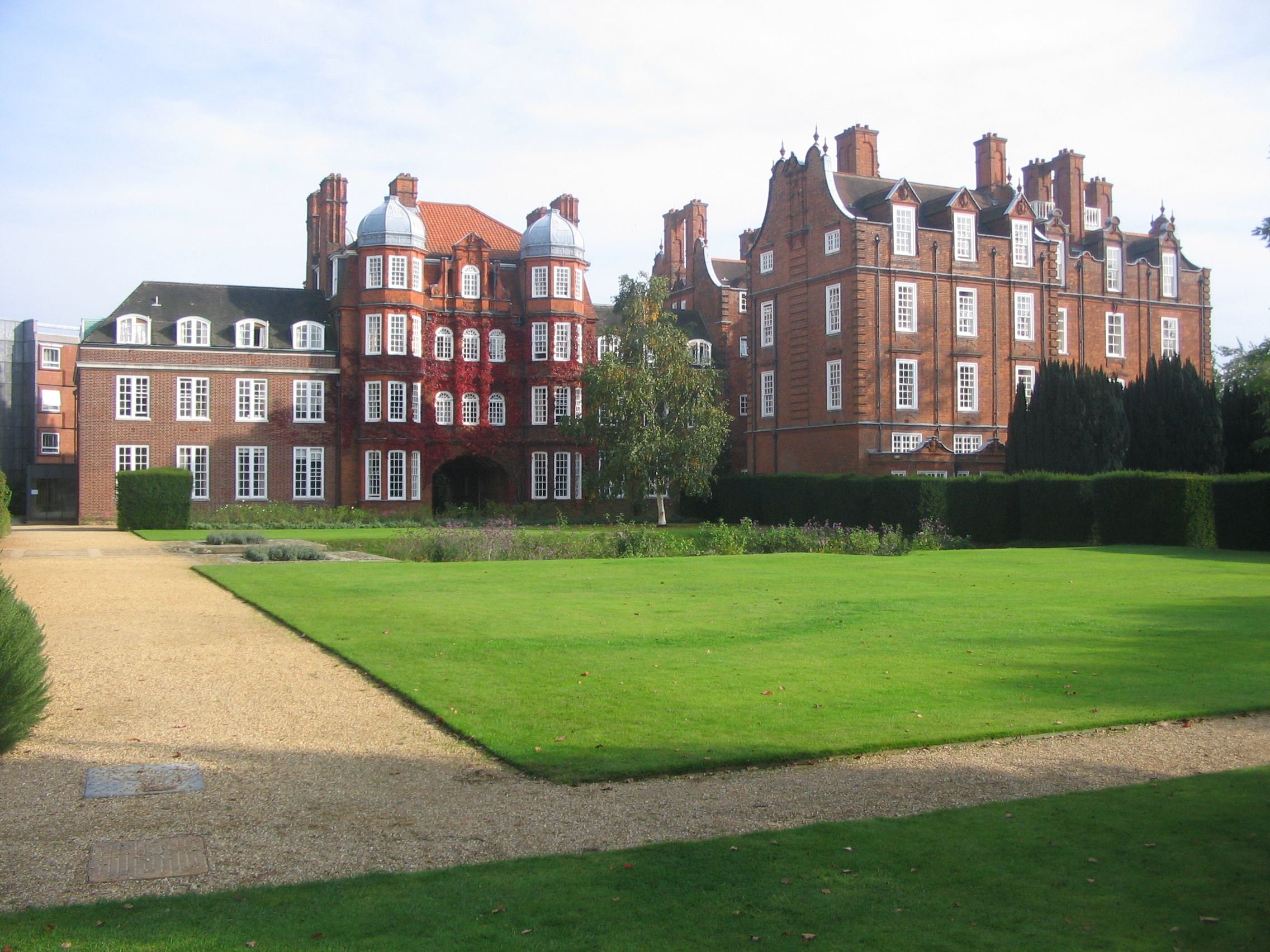
A view of Pfeiffer Arch and the Old Hall building

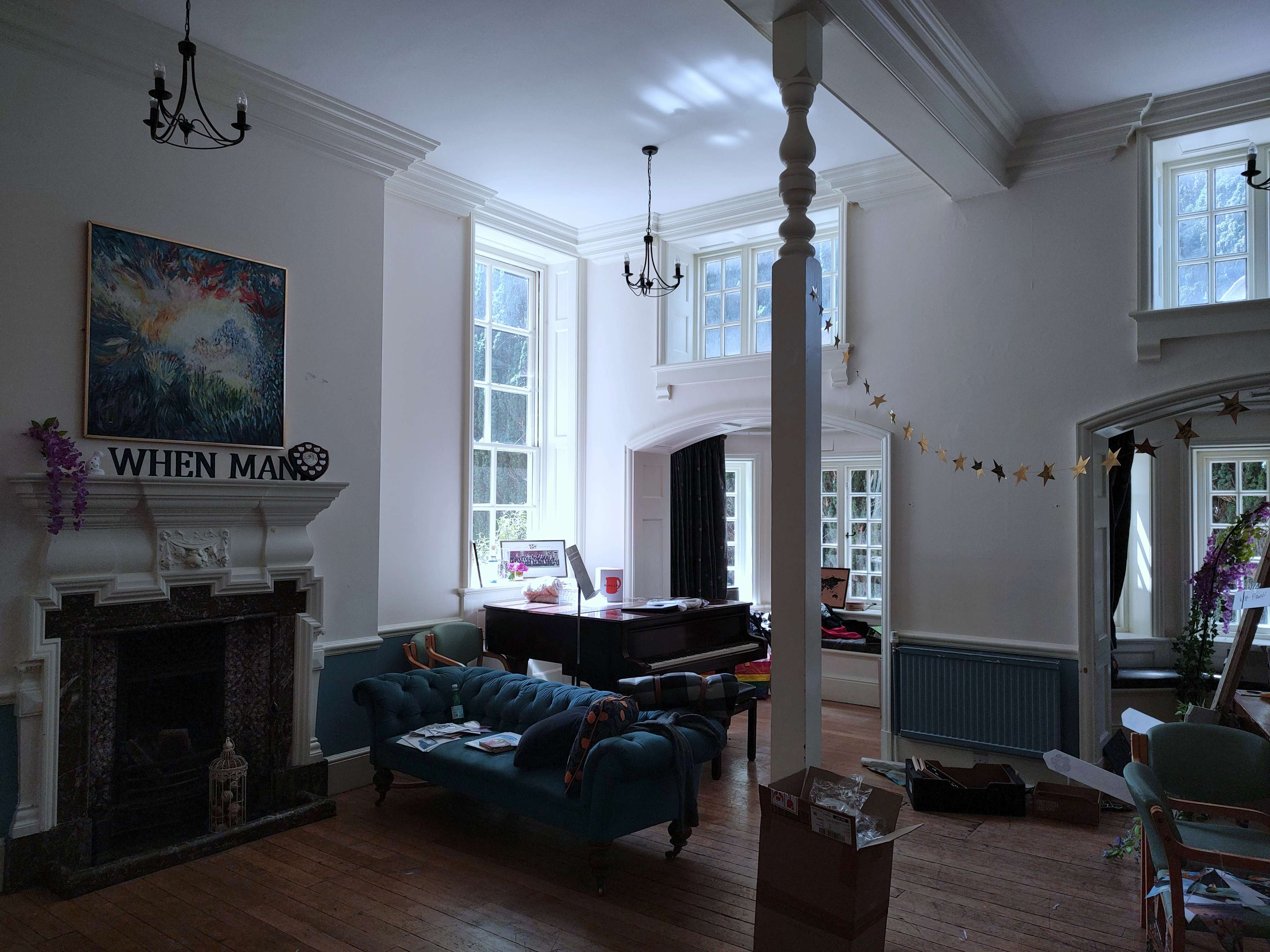
The Middle Combination Room in Old Hall

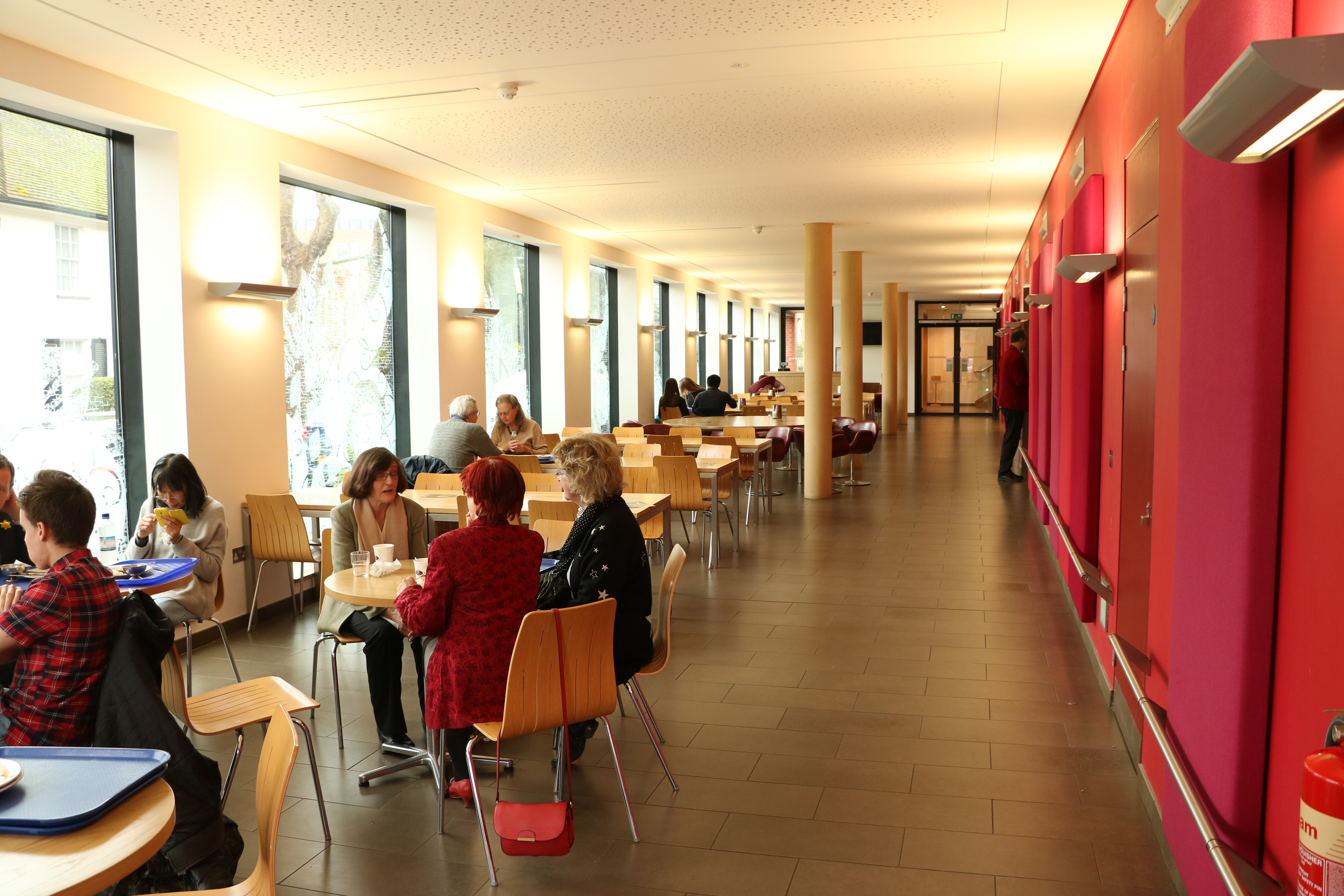
The Buttery, March 2017

== See also ==
- Category:Fellows of Newnham College, Cambridge
- Listed buildings in Cambridge (west)
