= Onora O'Neill =

British philosopher & college principal (born 1941)

The Right Honourable The Baroness O'Neill of Bengarve CH CBE HonFRS FBA FMedSci MRIA
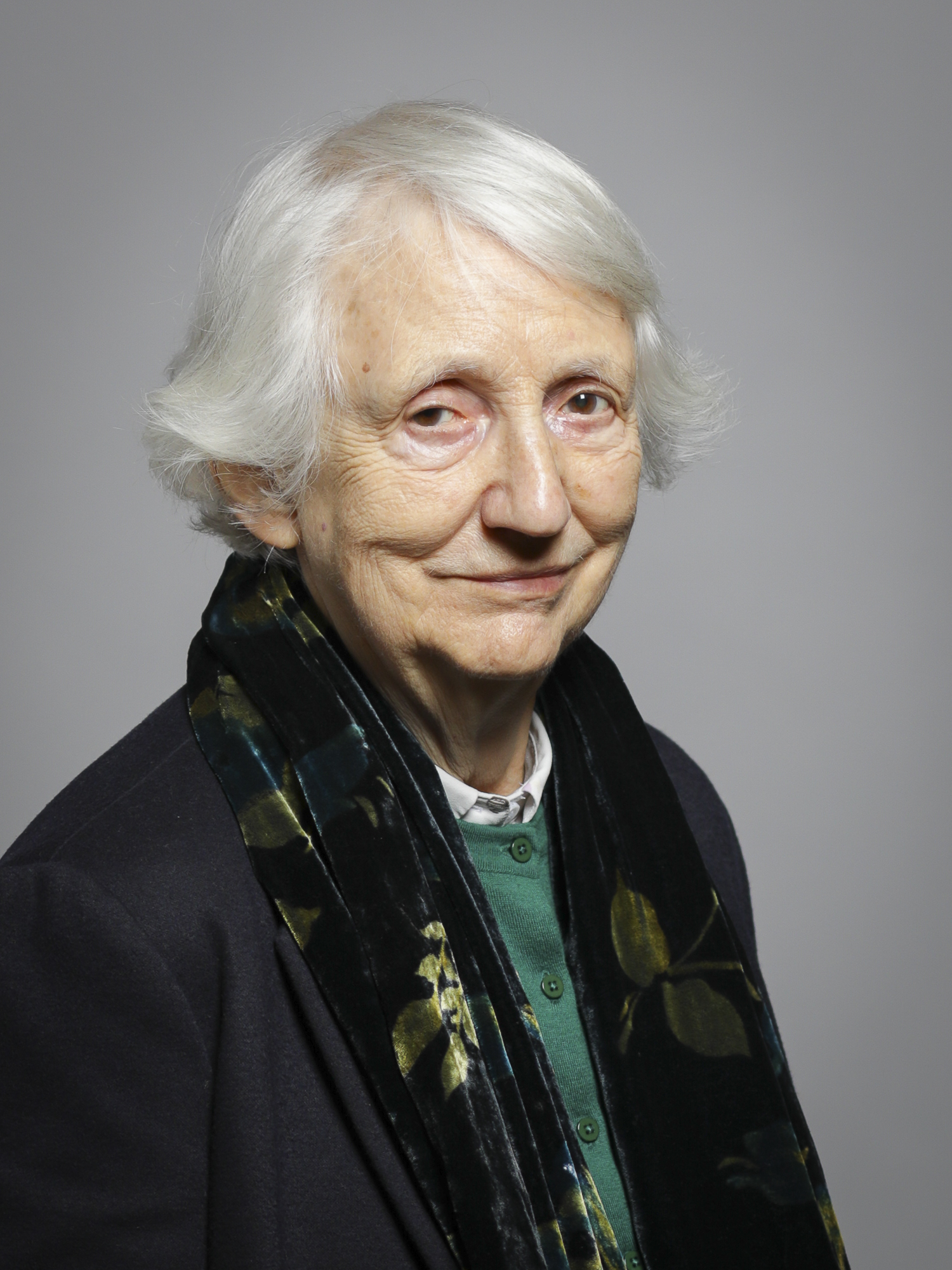

President of the British Academy
- In office 2005–2009
- Preceded by: The Viscount Runciman of Doxford
- Succeeded by: Sir Adam Roberts

Principal of Newnham College, Cambridge
- In office 1992–2006
- Preceded by: Sheila Browne
- Succeeded by: Patricia Hodgson

Member of the House of Lords
- Lord Temporal
- Life peerage 25 February 1999

Personal details
- Born: Onora Sylvia O'Neill; 23 August 1941 (age 85) Aughafatten, Northern Ireland
- Party: Crossbencher
- Education: Somerville College, Oxford (BA); Harvard University (MA, PhD)
- Awards: Berggruen Prize (2017); Holberg Prize (2017)

Education
- Doctoral advisor: John Rawls

Philosophical work
- Era: Contemporary philosophy
- Region: Western philosophy
- School: Analytic philosophy
- Institutions: Barnard College, Columbia University; University of Essex; Newnham College, Cambridge; University of Cambridge
- Main interests: Political philosophy; ethics
- Notable ideas: Autonomy in bioethics

Onora Sylvia O'Neill, Baroness O'Neill of Bengarve (born 23 August 1941) is a British philosopher and a crossbench member of the House of Lords.

== Early life and education ==
Onora Sylvia O'Neill was born on 23 August 1941 in Aughafatten. The daughter of Sir Con O'Neill, she was educated partly in Germany and at St Paul's Girls' School, London, before studying philosophy, psychology and physiology at Somerville College, Oxford. She went on to complete a doctorate at Harvard University, with John Rawls as supervisor.

== Career ==
During the 1970s, she taught at Barnard College, the women's college in Columbia University, New York City. In 1977, she returned to Britain and took up a post at the University of Essex; she was Professor of Philosophy there when she became Principal of Newnham College, Cambridge in 1992.

She is an Emeritus Professor of Philosophy at the University of Cambridge, a former President of the British Academy (2005–2009) and chaired the Nuffield Foundation (1998–2010). In 2001, she delivered the Gifford Lectures on Autonomy and Trust in Bioethics at the University of Edinburgh, and again in 2013 with a series titled From Toleration to Freedom of Expression. From 2004 to 2006, she was President of the British Philosophical Association. In 2013, she held the Spinoza Chair of Philosophy at the University of Amsterdam. Until October 2006, she was the Principal of Newnham College, Cambridge, and she was chair of the Equality and Human Rights Commission between 2012 and 2016. O'Neill's work has earned her numerous honours and awards, including the million-dollar Berggruen Prize.

== Philosophy ==
O'Neill has written widely on political philosophy and ethics, international justice, bioethics and the philosophy of Immanuel Kant.

Across various works, O'Neill has defended and applied a constructivist interpretation of Kantian ethics heavily influenced by, and yet critical of, the work of John Rawls, emphasising the importance of trust, consent and respect for autonomy in a just society. She has written extensively about trust, noting "that people often choose to rely on the very people whom they claimed not to trust" and suggesting that we "need to free professionals and the public service to serve the public...to work towards more intelligent forms of accountability...[and] to rethink a media culture in which spreading suspicion has become a routine activity". This distinction between trust and trustworthiness has been adopted by public statisticians such as David Spiegelhalter, similarly the concept of intelligent openness or transparency.

== Honours and distinctions ==
O'Neill has been President of the Aristotelian Society (1988 to 1989), a member of the Animal Procedures Committee (1990 to 1994), chair of Nuffield Council on Bioethics (1996 to 1998), a member and then acting chair of the Human Genetics Advisory Commission (1996 to 1999) and a member of the select committee on BBC Charter Review. She is presently chair of the Nuffield Foundation (since 1997), a trustee of Sense about Science (since 2002), a trustee of the Ditchley Foundation, and a trustee of the Gates Cambridge Trust. She also served as President of the British Academy between 2005 and 2009. She is on the Advisory Board of Incentives for Global Health, the NGO formed to develop the Health Impact Fund proposal.

In 1999, she was created a life peer as Baroness O'Neill of Bengarve, of The Braid in the County of Antrim, and in 2007 was elected an Honorary FRS. She is also a Foreign Honorary Member of the American Academy of Arts and Sciences (1993) and the Austrian Academy of Sciences (2002), a Foreign Member of the American Philosophical Society (2003), and Hon. Member Royal Irish Academy (2003), a Foreign Member of the Leopoldina (2004) and the Norwegian Academy of Sciences (2006) and a Fellow of the Academy of Medical Sciences. She is an elected fellow of the Hastings Center, an independent bioethics research institution. In 2007, O'Neill became an Honorary Fellow of the Royal Society. In 2004 she was awarded an Honorary Degree (Doctor of Letters) from the University of Bath. She is a Distinguished Senior Fellow of the School of Advanced Study, University of London, an honour awarded in 2009.

O'Neill also received an Honorary Doctorate from Heriot-Watt University in 2007, and from Harvard in 2010.

In October 2012, she was nominated as the next Chair of the Equality and Human Rights Commission, and confirmed as such in January 2013.

O'Neill was appointed a Member of the Order of the Companions of Honour (CH) in the 2014 New Year Honours for services to philosophy and public policy.

In 2014, O'Neill was elected to the German order Pour le mérite für Wissenschaften und Künste.

In September 2015, during the XII. quinquennial international Kant-conference in Vienna, she received the Kant-Preis of the Fritz Thyssen Stiftung for her scholarly work on the practical and political philosophy of Immanuel Kant. (see 12th International Kant Congress 2015 » Social Program)

In February 2016, she was awarded the Knight Commander's Cross of the Order of Merit of the Federal Republic of Germany for her outstanding contribution to moral and ethical questions of trust, accountability in civic life, justice and virtue.

Currently, she is the president of the Society for Applied Philosophy, a society founded in 1982 with the aim of promoting philosophical study and research that has a direct bearing on areas of practical concern.

In 2017, she was awarded the Norwegian Holberg Prize for outstanding contributions to research in the arts and humanities "for her influential role in ethical and political philosophy". The same year she was awarded the Berggruen Prize.

O'Neill is an Honorary Fellow of Somerville College.

In 2021, O'Neill received an honorary doctorate from the University of Antwerp.

In 2025, four ECPR Standing Groups founded an annual Onora O’Neill Political Theory Prize, which aims to recognise the best book published in political theory in the last three years.

Coat of arms of Onora O'Neill
Escutcheon Quarterly 1st & 4th per fess wavy the chief Argent and the base representing waves of the sea in chief a dexter hand couped at the wrist Gules in base a salmon naiant Proper (O'Neill) 2nd & 3rd chequy Or and Gules a chief Vert (Chichester). Supporters On either side a heron Proper beaked and legged Or holding in the beak a cross botony fitchy bendwise sinister Sable. Motto Lamh Dearg Eirin (The red hand of Ireland)

== Bibliography ==
=== Books ===
- O'Neill, Onora (1975). Acting on principle : an essay on Kantian ethics. New York: Columbia University Press.
- —— (1986). Faces of Hunger: An Essay on Poverty, Development and Justice. Allen & Unwin.
- —— (1989). Constructions of Reason: Exploration of Kant's Practical Philosophy. Cambridge University Press.
- —— (1996). Towards Justice and Virtue. Cambridge University Press.
- —— (2000). Bounds of Justice. Cambridge University Press.
- —— (2002). Autonomy and Trust in Bioethics (The 2001 Gifford Lectures). Cambridge University Press.
- —— (2002). A Question of Trust: The BBC Reith Lectures. Cambridge University Press.
- —— (2005). Justice, Trust and Accountability. Cambridge University Press.
- —— (2007). Rethinking Informed Consent in Bioethics. Cambridge University Press. (with Neil Manson)
- —— (2015). Constructing authorities : reason, politics, and interpretation in Kant's philosophy. Cambridge University Press.
- —— (2016). Justice across boundaries : whose obligations?. Cambridge University Press.
- —— (2016). Speech Rights and Speech Wrongs. Assen: Koninklijke van Gorcum.
- —— (2022). A Philosopher Looks at Digital Communication. Cambridge University Press.

=== Selected articles ===
- O'Neill, Onora (Summer 1985). "Between consenting adults". Philosophy & Public Affairs. 14 (3). Wiley: 252–277. JSTOR 2265350.
- —— (June 1998). "Kant on duties regarding nonrational nature". Proceedings of the Aristotelian Society, Supplementary Volumes. 72 (1): 211–228. doi:10.1111/1467-8349.00043. JSTOR 4107017.
- —— (December 2003). "Constructivism vs. contractualism". Ratio. 16 (4): 319–331. doi:10.1046/j.1467-9329.2003.00226.x.

See also: Scanlon, T. M. (December 2003). "Replies". Ratio. 16 (4): 424–439. doi:10.1046/j.1467-9329.2003.00231.x.

- —— (March–April 2013). "Interpreting the world, changing the world". Philosophy Now. 95: 8–9.
- —— (2018). "Trustworthiness in Public Life" (PDF). COMEC Occasional Papers (11): 5–10.

== See also ==
- List of Northern Ireland members of the House of Lords

Academic offices
Preceded by Sheila Browne	Principal of Newnham College, Cambridge; 1992–2006	Succeeded by Patricia Hodgson
Professional and academic associations
Preceded by Roger Trigg	President of the British Philosophical Association; 2004–2006	Succeeded by Brad Hooker
Preceded by The Viscount Runciman of Doxford	President of the British Academy; 2005–2009	Succeeded by Sir Adam Roberts
Awards
Preceded by Charles Taylor	Berggruen Prize; 2017	Succeeded by Martha Nussbaum
