= Myra Curtis =

English civil servant and college head (1886–1971)

- Portrait by Herbert James Gunn
- Born: October 2, 1886; Sunderland, England
- Died: June 27, 1971 (aged 84); Bognor Regis, England
- Known for: Principal of Newnham College
- Predecessor: Pernel Strachey
- Successor: Ruth Louisa Cohen
- Parent(s): George and Annie Curtis

Dame Myra Curtis DBE (2 October 1886 – 27 June 1971) was an editor, civil servant, and the Principal of Newnham College, Cambridge from 1942 to 1954.

== Early life ==
Curtis was born on 2 October 1886 in Sunderland. She was the daughter of George and Annie (Johnson) Curtis. The former worked at the Post Office while his wife was an elementary school teacher. Curtis was educated at Allan's Endowed Girls' School, Newcastle upon Tyne, Winchester High School and Newnham College, Cambridge.

After finishing school, she was an editor of the Victoria County History for seven years while also working as a private tutor.

== Civil service ==
Curtis' civil service career began in 1915 when she became part of the temporary staff of the War Trade Intelligence Department. By 1918, she transferred to the Ministry of Food and became the Deputy Assistant Secretary in the Establishment Branch from 1920 to 1922. She became a permanent civil servant in 1923 after passing the first competitive examination for super-clerical grade women, in which she placed first. She then held positions in the Ministry of Pensions and the Post Office. Later, she was assumed the Assistant Secretary and Director of Women's Establishments in the Treasury, which was considered the premier women's post in the Civil Service. She retired from government work in 1942,

Curtis headed a government committee addressing children's care for England and Wales in 1946. This resulted to the so-called Curtis Report, which was described as "the first enquiry in this country directed specifically to the care of children deprived of a normal home life". It was presented to the Labour government, which replaced the war-time coalition government in 1945. The report led to the enactment of the Children Act 1948, which mandated that every local authority to set up a children's committee to advance children's interests.

Curtis was created a Dame Commander of the British Empire in 1949.

== Academic career ==
Following her retirement from the civil service in 1941, Curtis was elected Principal of Newnham College, taking office in January 1942. She would hold the post until 1954. She enabled the college to carry on in the face of wartime and immediate post-war restrictions, and as a civil servant, worked to improve the efficiency of academic administration. It was a difficult and frustrating process, particularly amid the restrictions of the post-war period.

Curtis played an important part in the negotiations on behalf of the women's colleges which resulted in women finally being awarded degrees from the University of Cambridge. In 1952 she was the first woman elected to the council of the Senate at Cambridge, and she chaired the women's appointments board. She also chaired a committee which promoted the establishment of a third women's college to accommodate the growing number of women at Cambridge: the result was New Hall, opened in October 1954, and now Murray Edwards College.

Academic offices
| Preceded by Pernel Strachey | Principal of Newnham College, Cambridge; 1942–1954 | Succeeded by Ruth Louisa Cohen |
