= Jacqueline Morgan =

Principal of Newnham College, Cambridge
- Incumbent
- Assumed office 1 September 2026
- Preceded by: Alison Rose

Personal details
- Born: Jacqueline Anne Morgan; April 1968 (age 58)

Academic background
- Education: University of Glasgow; Balliol College, Oxford
- Thesis: Heven and erthe in lytyl space: the theology of conception, birth and infancy in later Middle English religious literature, with particular reference to the Virgin and Christ (1997)

Academic work
- Discipline: Early Modern English literature
- Sub-discipline: Chaucer; early Tudor Literature; The Makars; medical humanities
- Institutions: New College, Oxford; University of Stirling; Newnham College, Cambridge; Clare College, Cambridge; Faculty of English, University of Cambridge

Jacqueline Anne Morgan (formerly Tasioulas; born April 1968) is a Scottish scholar of literature who specialises in medieval literature and early Tudor literature, including Chaucer and The Makars. She is Principal of Newnham College, Cambridge.

== Early life and education ==
Jacqueline Morgan was born in April 1968 in Glasgow, Scotland. She studied at the University of Glasgow, graduating with an undergraduate Master of Arts (MA Hons) degree. Having been warded a Snell Exhibition at Balliol College, Oxford, she undertook a Doctor of Philosophy (DPhil) degree at the Faculty of English Language and Literature, University of Oxford. Her doctoral thesis was titled "Heven and erthe in lytyl space: the theology of conception, birth and infancy in later Middle English religious literature, with particular reference to the Virgin and Christ", and was completed in 1997.

== Academic career ==
Morgan started her academic career as a junior research fellow at New College, Oxford, and then as a lecturer at the University of Stirling. She is Professor of Medieval English and Scots at the Faculty of English, University of Cambridge. In 1999, she joined Newnham College, Cambridge as director of studies and a college teaching officer in English. She moved to become a fellow of Clare College, Cambridge in 2005, and served as its senior tutor from 2016 to 2026. On 2 September 2016, she was made a university lecturer in English. On 1 October 2023, she was appointed Professor of Medieval English and Scots.

In December 2025, it was announced that Morgan had been elected the next principal of Newnham College, Cambridge. She was installed as principal on 1 September 2026. She was made a bye-fellow of her former college, Clare.

== Selected works ==
(as J. A. Tasioulas)

- Tasioulas, Jacqueline, ed. (1999). The Makars: the poems of Henryson, Dunbar, and Douglas. Edinburgh: Canongate Books. ISBN 978-0862418205.
- Murdoch, Brian; Tasioulas, J. A., eds. (2002). The apocryphal lives of Adam and Eve. Exeter: University of Exeter Press. ISBN 9780859896986.
- Tasioulas, Jacqueline A. (2020). Chaucer: the basics. London; New York: Routledge, Taylor & Francis Group. ISBN 9781138667709.
