= Aughafatten =

Village in County Antrim, Northern Ireland

Coordinates: 54.916°N 6.081°W

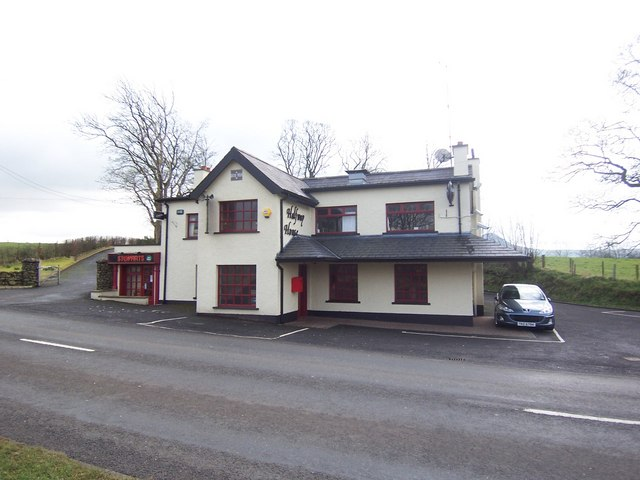
The Halfway House Public House

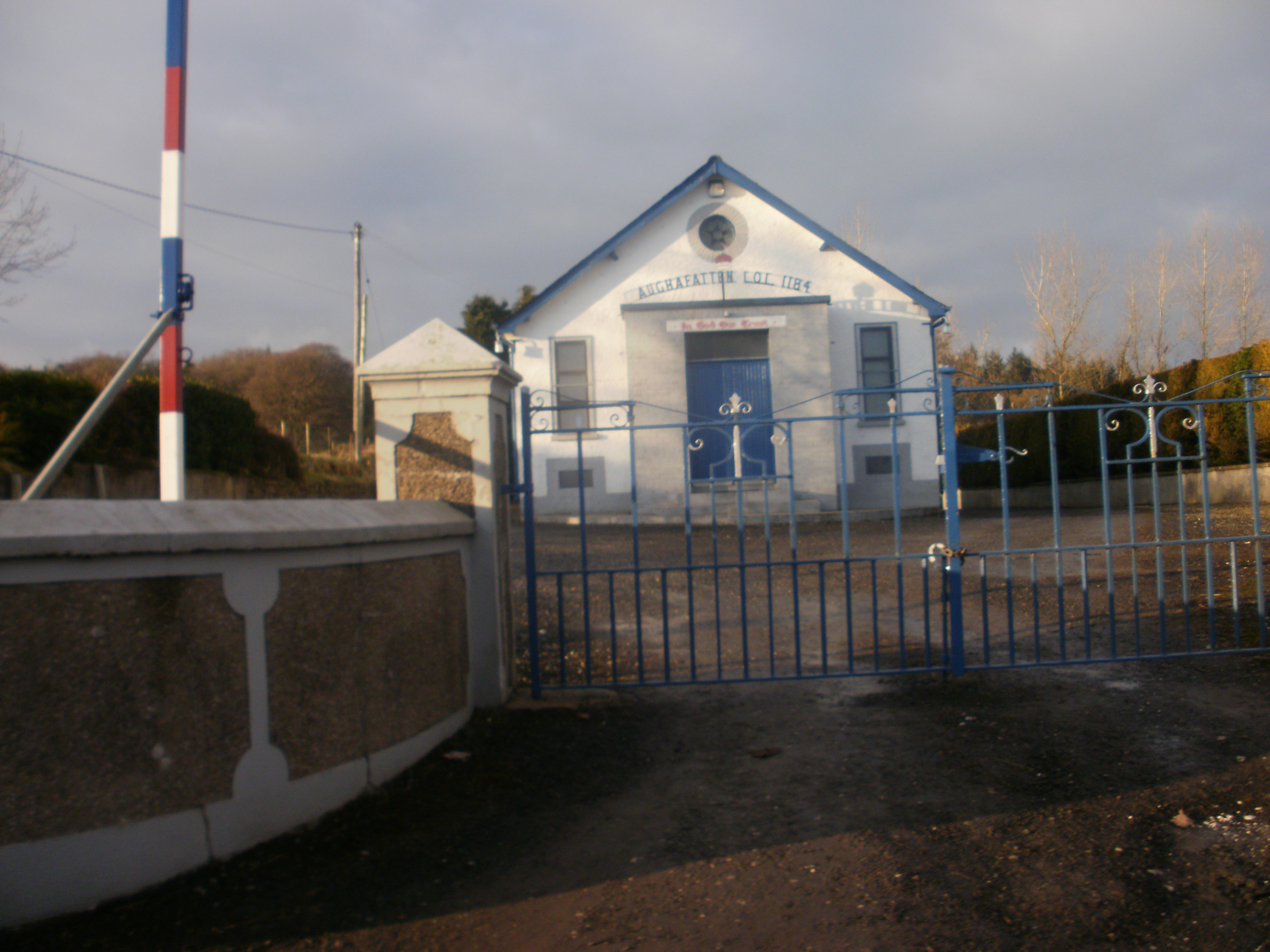
Aughafatten Orange Hall

Aughafatten or Aghafatten (from Irish Achadh Pheatan/Pheatáin 'Peatan's field') is a small village and townland between Carnlough and Broughshane in County Antrim, Northern Ireland. It is in Mid and East Antrim District Council and part of the North Antrim constituency for local and European elections. There are views of Slemish mountain from the area.

Local services include an Orange Hall. The local accordion band Aughafatten Coronation Accordion Band take part in regular Orange Order parades. They take part in various parades across Northern Ireland and are affiliated to the Braid District of the Orange Order.

== Notable people ==
- Onora O'Neill (born 1941), philosopher and a crossbench member of the House of Lords
- Nigel Gray (born 1941), West Australian author of books for both children and adults

== See also ==
- List of villages in Northern Ireland
