= Alison Rose (diplomat) =

British diplomat and academic leader

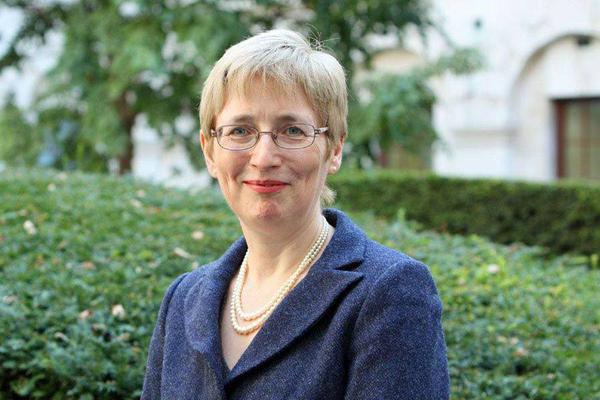

Principal of Newnham College
- In office 7 October 2019 – 31 August 2026
- Preceded by: Carol M. Black
- Succeeded by: Jacqueline Morgan

British Ambassador to Belgium
- In office 11 August 2014 – 21 June 2019
- Preceded by: Jonathan Brenton
- Succeeded by: Martin Shearman

Personal details
- Born: Alison Jane Rose; 10 December 1961 (age 64) Coventry, United Kingdom
- Education: Newnham College, Cambridge

Alison Jane Rose (born 10 December 1961) is a British former diplomat and academic administrator.She was the British ambassador to Belgium from 2014 until 2019, and principal of Newnham College, Cambridge from 2019 to 2026

== Early life and education ==
Rose was born in Coventry and studied at Barr’s Hill Grammar School. She read modern history at Newnham College, Cambridge, and was the first in her family to gain a degree.

== Career ==
Rose joined the Civil Service in 1983, working in the Manpower Services Commission. She joined the Foreign and Commonwealth Office in 1999 and developed an EU specialism and worked for the FCO in Paris, London and Brussels. She was appointed as British ambassador to Belgium in October 2013, and was in post from 11 August 2014 to July 2019. The issues arising from Brexit during her tenure gave her opinions particular interest in the Belgian media.

Rose was elected by Newnham College, Cambridge, as the principal-elect in January 2019, and was formally installed in office in October 2019, as the thirteenth Principal of Newnham. Her seven year term ended in 2026, and she was succeeded in the role by Jacqueline Morgan.

Diplomatic posts
Preceded by Jonathan Brenton	British Ambassador to Belgium; 2014–2019	Succeeded by Martin Shearman
Academic offices
Preceded by Carol M. Black	Principal of Newnham College; 2019–2026	Succeeded by Jacqueline Morgan
