= Sheila Browne (educator) =

English academic (1924–2015)

Sheila Jeanne Browne, CB (25 December 1924 – 26 August 2015) was an English academic specialising in Medieval French, Chief Inspector of Schools for the United Kingdom, and Principal of Newnham College, Cambridge.

== Early life and education ==
Browne was born on 25 December 1924. She was educated at Ranelagh School in Bracknell, before studying modern languages at Lady Margaret Hall, Oxford. After graduating in 1945, she spent two years at the École Nationale des Chartes.

== Career ==
In 1947 Browne began teaching and researching as an Assistant Lecturer at Royal Holloway College, University of London. In 1951 she became a Tutor, Fellow and Lecturer in French at St Hilda's College, Oxford.

In 1961 Browne was appointed as an Inspector of Schools, then in 1970 Staff Inspector for Secondary Education until 1972. She was promoted to Chief Inspector of Schools in 1974, and held this post until 1983. Her reports were frequently critical of government policy. She spoke out against what she saw as government interference in the operations and curriculum of the school system and about the standards set for school inspectors. She also spoke out about the need for research into effective methods of education in a changing society. In the 1977 Silver Jubilee and Birthday Honours, she was appointed a Companion of the Order of the Bath.

Browne became an Honorary Fellow of St Hilda's College in 1978. She was Principal of Newnham College, Cambridge, from 1983 to 1992. She was described by the vice-principal, Gill Sutherland, as "a formidable administrator, not afraid to grasp nettles and guaranteed to test the argument of any and every draft paper for a meeting to its limits". Mary Beard wrote that she could be "terrifying", particularly to younger colleagues, but was also generous.

== Personal ==
Browne did not marry. Her leisure interests included bellringing, mountains and medieval France. She died on 26 August 2015.

Academic offices
Preceded by Jean Floud	Principal of Newnham College, Cambridge; 1983–1992	Succeeded by Onora O'Neill
