= Lindsay Laird =

British biologist

Lindsay Margaret Laird (2 September 1949 – 2 August 2001) was a British biologist who was influential in the development of the aquaculture of salmon and other fishes through her research, teaching and the books that she produced. She defined the standards for Organic Farmed Salmon, and introduced quality assurance labelling for farmed salmon.

== Education ==
Lindsay Laird was educated at Worcester Grammar School for girls and at Newnham College, Cambridge where she not only read Natural Science (Zoology) but also played squash for Cambridge, gaining a half-blue. During her time at Cambridge a brown hairy moth from Borneo (Dasychira lairdi) was named after her. After graduation in 1971, an Atlantic Salmon Trust scholarship took her to Sutherland in the far north of Scotland to study the wild salmon of the River Brora, which was followed by Ph.D. studies on salmon and trout in North Wales under the supervision of Dr Jack Jones of Liverpool University. Her work on salmon continued at Liverpool University where she obtained her Ph.D.in 1974 with her thesis Growth and Movements of Juvenile Atlantic Salmon & Brown Trout in AfonMynach.

== Career ==
Laird began her career in 1975 at the University of Stirling Aquatic Pathobiology Unit, on a Shell Fellowship. She also published key papers on basic techniques now considered routine: freeze branding of juvenile salmon, and benzocaine as a fish anaesthetic. The following year she obtained Nuffield Foundation funding for a project at Aberdeen University on methods of inducing auto-immune rejection of fish gonads.

Laird applied her fundamental knowledge of life cycles of salmon to the developing aquaculture industry in Scotland and Norway which at that time was struggling with problems of control of sexual maturation in salmon. She conducted in Norway the first experiments on autoimmune sterilization of salmon by injection. She foresaw the need to control of the life cycle of salmon in captivity in order to make production more predictable and also more profitable.

After she defined the standards for Organic Farmed Salmon (together with K. McCallum of Orkney Salmon), her concept of a green label for farmed salmon to provide quality assurance for customers was taken up by firms such as Marks & Spencer.

In 1988 she became a Teaching fellow and Aquaculture Development Officer at the University of Aberdeen, where she developed the Bachelor of Technology (B. Tech.) in Aquaculture, jointly run with the Scottish Agricultural College. She joined the Scottish Fisheries Committee the next year, monitoring effects of the electricity industry on salmon and other fisheries, and was also invited by Shetland Salmon Farming Association to advise on the Braer oil pollution spill.

Laird was invited to join the Scottish Salmon Strategy Task Force in 1995, and in 1998 became Vice-President of the Scottish Executive Fisheries Committee.

Beyond Scotland, from 1992 she was involved in EU education and training programmes FORCE, COMETT, ERASMUS and LEONARDO. Between 1992 and 1997 she spent periods of time at the Danum Valley Research Centre, Sabah, funded by the Royal Society and the Natural Environment Research Council (NERC), and on aquaculture and fisheries projects in Sarawak, Philippines, Taiwan and Singapore. In 1994 she worked in the Kola Peninsula, Russia, journeying across the tundra near Murmansk in Russian ex-military helicopters to report on salmon fishing for the British Council. In 1997 she was UK delegate on the EU ALFA project, visiting fish farms in Chile.

Lindsay Laird died from cancer in 2001. Her name was given to the Lindsay Laird Innovation in Aquaculture Award, inaugurated in 2008.

== Books ==
Laird co-edited Salmon and Trout Farming (1988) and co-wrote Handbook of Salmon Farming (2002). She also translated Aquaculture Volumes 1 & 2 (1990) and Carp Biology and Farming from the original French.

== Board memberships and directorships ==
1992: Fellowship, Institute of Fisheries Management, (Training Committee)

1992: Director of AquaTT, Irish Aquaculture Training Partnership

1993: Board of Directors, Lakeland Marine Farm Ltd

1994-2000: Board member of European Aquaculture Society (EAS)

1997-2001: Board member, AMC Ltd. Ireland

1998: first Chairman, Organic Fish Producers Association

== Honours ==
- Lindsay Laird Student Award for Innovation in Aquaculture (jointly awarded by AQUATT and AQUALEX Multimedia Consortium Ltd)
- Lindsay Margaret Laird Prize (Zoology), University of Aberdeen (best student in MSc Marine and Fisheries Science)

== Selected research publications ==
- Laird LM et al., 1975. Freeze branding of juvenile salmon, Journal of Fish Biology, Vol 7 (2) 167-171
- Laird LM & RL Oswald, 1975. A Note on the use of benzocaine(Ethyl P-Aminobenzoate) as a fish anaesthetic. Aquaculture Research, Vol 6 (4) 92-94
- 1980. Field trials of a method of induction of autoimmunegonad rejection in Atlantic salmon (Salmon salar L.).
- Keith M. Martin-Smith, Lindsay M. Laird, Luke Bullough and Matthew G. Lewis, 1990. Mechanisms of maintenance of tropical freshwater fish in the face of disturbance, Philosophical Transactions, Royal Society B. DOI: 10.1098/rstb.1999.0522

== Editorial and translations ==
- 1984: Series editor Ellis Horwood Aquaculture and Fisheries Support series.
- 1988: Salmon and Trout Farming (Laird & Needham, Eds), 10 editions, Ellis Horwood.
- 1990: Aquaculture (2 volumes) G.Barnabe Translation.
- 1994: Report on salmon fishing in Russia for British Council.
- 1997: AQUALEX, European multilingual aquaculture glossary, John Wiley & Sons
- 1999: Carp, Biology and Culture R. Billiard Translation.
- 2000: Aquaculture section, Encyclopedia of Ocean Sciences, Editor J. Steele, Woods Hole Oceanographic Institute.
- 2002: Handbook of Salmon Farming (Stead & Laird, Eds) 8 editions, Springer.

== Publications ==
Extended content

=== Refereed publications ===
Laird L.M. (1972). The River Brora. Salmon and Trout Magazine 143-148.

Laird L.M., Roberts, RJ, Shearer WM & McArdle, JF (1975). Freeze branding of juvenile salmon. J. Fish Biol. 7, 167-171.

Laird L.M. & Oswald, RL (1975). A note on the use of benzocaine (Ethyl-P-aminobenzoate) as a fish anaesthetic. Fish Mgmt 6, 92-94.

Laird L.M. and Stott B, (1978). Marking and tagging. In Methods for the Assessment of Fish Production in freshwaters. Ed Bagenal, T. 84-100.

Laird L.M., Ellis, AE, Wilson, AR & Holliday, FGT (1978). The development of the gonadal and immune systems of the Atlantic salmon (Salmo salar L.) and a consideration of the possibility of inducing autoimmune destruction of the testis. Ann. Biol. Anim. Bioch. Biophys., 18, 1101-1106.

Laird L.M. (1978) Marking Fish. In, Animal Marking and Tagging. Macmillan, London.

Laird L.M. & Wilson, AR (1979). A method for improving the survival of fish eggs during transportation. Fish. Mgmt 110, 129-131.

Laird L.M., Wilson, AR & Holliday, FGT (1980). Lesions observed in the testis of precociously maturing male Atlantic salmon, Salmo salar L. J.Fish Biol. 17, 343-348.

Laird L.M., Wilson, AR & Holliday, FGT (1980). Field trials of a method of induction of autoimmune gonad rejection in Atlantic salmon (Salmo salar L.) Reprod. Nutr. Develop., 20, 1761-1788.

Laird L.M., (1980). Control of reproduction in farmed salmonids. Proceedings of the 12th Annual Study Course, Institute of Fisheries Management.

Secombes, C.J., Laird, L.M. and Priede, I.G. (1982). Fish sterilisation: the autoimmune approach. In: Reproductive Physiology of Fish. (ed. by C.J.J. Richter and H.J.Th. Goos). Pudoc, Wageningen, p. 81.

Secombes, C.J., Lewis, A.E., Laird, L.M., Needham, E.A. and Priede, I.G. (1984). Agglutination of spermatozoa by autoantibodies in the rainbow trout (Salmo gairdneri). J. Fish Biology 25: 691-696.

Secombes, C.J., Lewis, A.E., Laird, L.M., Needham, E.A. and Priede, I.G. (1985). Experimentally induced immune reactions to gonad in rainbow trout (Salmo gairdneri). In: The FSBI Symposium on Fish Immunology. (ed. by M.J. Manning and M.F. Tatner). Academic Press, London, pp. 343–355.

Secombes, C.J., Lewis, A.E., Needham, E.A., Laird, L.M. and Priede, I.G. (1985). Appearance of autoantigens during gonad maturation in the rainbow trout (Salmo gairdneri). J. Exp. Zoology 233: 425-431.

Secombes, C.J., Needham, E.A., Laird, L.M., Lewis, A.E. and Priede, I.G. (1985). The long-term effects of auto-immunologically induced granulomas on the testes of rainbow trout (Salmo gairdneri, Richardson). J. Fish Biol. 26: 483-489.

Secombes, C.J., Lewis, A.E., Laird, L.M., Needham, E.A. and Priede, I.G. (1985). The role of autoantibodies in the autoimmune response to testis in rainbow trout (Salmo gairdneri). Immunology 56: 409-415.

Secombes, C.J., Laird, L.M. and Priede, I.G. (1987). Immunological approaches to control maturation in fish. II. A review of the autoimmune approach. Aquaculture 60: 287-302.

Laird L.M. & Needham, EA, (1988) Salmon farming and the future of the Atlantic salmon. In The status of the Atlantic salmon in Scotland. ITE/NERC publication, Ed Jenkins D., 66-72

Noack P, McLay, HA, Noble LR & Laird L.M. (1996). Carotenoid pigments as a means for differentiating eggs and offspring of anadromous and non-anadromous trout. Physiology of Migratory Fish. Symposium proceedings. International Congress on the biology of fishes. Eds McCormick, S., Sheridan M., Patino R and MacKinlay, D. pp 91–99.

Laird L.M. (1996). History and Applications of salmonid culture. In Principles of salmonid culture. Pennell W and Barton BA (Eds). pp 1 – 28 Elsevier.

Laird L.M. (1997). Salmon and Trout Farming. Nutrition and Food Science 3, 101-104.

Youngson AF, Mitchell AI, Noack, PT and Laird L.M. (1997). Carotenoid pigment profiles distinguish anadromous and nonanadromous brown trout (Salmo trutta). Can.J. Fish. Aquat. Sci. 54: 1064-1066.

Noack PT, Laird L.M., Priede IG (1997). Carotenoids of sea lice (Lepeophtheirus salmonis) as potential indicators of host Atlantic salmon (Salmo salar L.). ICES Journal of Marine Science, 54: 1140-1143.

Martin-Smith KM, Laird L.M., (1998). Depauperate freshwater fish communities in Sabah: the role of barriers to movement and habitat quality. J. Fish Biol. 53 (Supplement A) 331 – 344.

Martin-Smith KM, Laird L.M., Bullough L & Lewis MG (1999). Mechanisms of maintenance of tropical freshwater fish communities in the face of disturbance. Phil Trans R.Soc.Lond.B 18-3-1810.

Martin-Smith, K. M. & Laird, L.M. (1999). Reproductive patterns in some Cypriniformes from Borneo. Proc. 5th Indo-Pac. Fish Conf., Nouméa 1997 (eds. B. Seret & J.-Y. Sire): 493-504. Paris: Soc. Fr. Ichtyol.

Martin-Smith, K. M., Bullough, L. & Laird, L.M. (1999). Short-term movements of freshwater fishes in Sabah, Borneo. Proc. 5th Indo-Pac. Fish Conf., Nouméa 1997 (eds. B. Seret & J.-Y. Sire): 45-56. Paris: Soc. Fr. Ichtyol.

=== Conference abstracts ===
Revell B, Laird L.M., and Clay P (1995). Benefits of introducing a system of Electronic Auctions in the Fish Industry. In Quality in Aquaculture, European Aquaculture Society Special Publication No 23.

Laird L.M. (1998). Development and Operation of Quality Standards for Farmed Atlantic Salmon, Salmo salar L: A Case Study. In Book of Abstracts, World Aquaculture 1998, World Aquaculture Society.

Laird L.M. (1999). Impact of the quality movement on salmon farming in Scotland and the development of standards for Organic Aquaculture. In Towards Predictable Quality. European Aquaculture Society Special Publication No 27.

=== Publications from Government Committee ===
Salmon Advisory Committee technical reports:

Factors affecting emigrating smolts and returning adults (1993).

Run timing of salmon (1994).

The effects of predation on salmon fisheries (1996).

The anti-poaching measures contained in the Salmon Act 1986. (1996).

Salmon in the Sea (1996).

Fish passes and screens for salmon. MAFF Publications, London (1996).

Scottish Salmon Strategy Task Force (The Nickson Committee)

Report of the Scottish Salmon Strategy Task Force (1997). SOAEFD Publications, Edinburgh

=== Reports ===
Priede I.G. & Laird L.M. (1986). Fecundity of female mackerel (Scomber scrombrus). Report to the Scottish Office. 34pp.

Laird L.M. & Priede I.G. (1986). Histological investigations of mackerel fecundity. Report to the Scottish Office. 22pp.

Laird L.M. & Priede I.G. (1986). Notes of a stereological technique for the estimation of the number of oocytes in the ovary of mackerel (Scomber scombrus). Report to the Scottish Office. 11pp.

=== Books (editor and contributor) ===
Laird L.M. & Needham EA (1988). Salmon and trout farming. Ellis Horwood, Chichester.

Laird L.M. & Needham EA (1988). The farmed salmonids (Ch 1 in above book).

Laird L.M., (1990) (Editor). Institute of Fisheries Management: The first 21 years. Publishers: Institute of Fisheries Management, Nottingham.

Laird L.M. & Needham EA (1989/90). Seawater culture of salmonids. In Aquaculture Volume 2. TecDoc Lavoisier (French)/Ellis Horwood (English).

Lucas, MC, Diack, I & Laird L.M. (1991). Editors: Interactions between fisheries and the environment. Proceedings of the Institute of Fisheries Management 22nd Annual Study Course, University of Aberdeen.

Laird L.M. (1988) - Editor. Ellis Horwood Aquaculture and Fisheries Support Series.

Laird L.M. (1997). Forward to AQUALEX – A Glossary of Aquaculture terms. Ed M. Eleftheriou, J.Wiley, Chichester.

Laird L.M. & Reinertsen H. (1999). Towards Predictable Quality. Abstracts of contributions presented at the International Conference Aquaculture Europe 99 Trondheim Norway. European Aquaculture Society Special Publication No 27. Oostende, Belgium.

=== Translations (from French) ===
Published:

Barnabe, G. (1990). Aquaculture, Volumes 1 & 2. Translator L.Laird. Ellis Horwood, Chichester, 1104 pp.

Barnabe G. (1994). Aquaculture: biology and ecology of cultured species. Translator L.Laird Ellis Horwood, Chichester, 403pp.

Billiard R. (1999) Carp: Biology and Culture. Translator L. Laird Praxis Springer. 342pp.

=== Translation editor ===
Steffens

Barnabe

=== Book reviews ===
For Fisheries Research:

Stickney: Principles of aquaculture.

Pillay: Aquaculture Development: Progress and Prospects - For Fisheries Research.

For the Biologist: Black & Pickering: Biology of Farmed fish.

=== Specialist manuals ===
Sell D. & Laird L.M. (1988). Marine Fouling and Aquaculture. Institute of Fisheries Management Specialist Section booklet 9pp.

Laird L.M. and Kennedy C. (1994). Management of Risk in Fish and Shellfish Farming. Published under EU FORCE programme. 45 pages.

Laird L.M. & Garforth D. (1995). Attitudes to training and qualifications in the European fish farming industry. 39 pages. Published by AQUATT for the EU FORCE Programme.

Contributor to: Shields Y. & Garforth, D. (1995). Facing future trends and challenges in the fish farming industry in Europe. 35 pages Published by AQUATT for the EU FORCE Programme.

=== Articles in specialist and trade press ===
Laird L.M. & Priede I.G. (1982). Why the angler wins. Trout & Salmon. 330:47.

Laird L.M. & Priede I.G. (1983). When a trout heart skips a beat. Trout & Salmon 333:65.

Laird L.M. & Priede I.G. (1984). How does a coho come home? Trout & Salmon 345: 59-60.

Laird L.M. & Priede I.G. (1984). How many eggs? Trout & Salmon 346: 102.

Laird L.M. & Priede I.G. (1984). Why we don't need 'super salmon'. Trout & Salmon. 349:47.

Laird L.M.. Courses meet big need for trained workers. Fish Farming International. September 1994.

Laird L.M.. Trout from inside the Arctic Circle. Fish Farming International. November 1994.

Laird L.M. (1995). Halibut by any other name? (1995). Fish Farmer 18, No 4 p13.

Laird L.M. (1996). Work Placements Benefit Students and Farmers. Fish Farming International, Volume 23, Number 2, 10-11.

Revell BJ, Clay P, Laird L.M. (1996). A simpler way to sell? Fish Farmer Volume 19 Number 2, 11-12.

Laird L.M. (1998). Some recent developments in aquaculture training. Fish Farmer Volume 21, No 2.

Laird L.M. (1999). The future in organic Fish Farmer. Volume 22 (18).

=== Manuscripts submitted 1998 ===
Martin-Smith, K. M. & Laird L.M. (submitted). Reproductive patterns in some Cypriniformes from Borneo. Sybil.

Martin-Smith, K. M., Bullough, L. & Laird L.M. (submitted). Short-term movements of freshwater fishes in Sabah, Borneo. Cybium.
