= Ruth Cohen (economist) =

British economist

Ruth Louisa Cohen, CBE (10 November 1906 – 27 July 1991) was a British economist, who served as Principal of Newnham College of the University of Cambridge from 1954 to 1972.

== Life ==
She studied at Newnham College, Cambridge, as an undergraduate in the 1920s. In 1930, she received a Commonwealth Fund Fellowship to go to the US. She spent two years at Stanford and Cornell.

On her return, she worked at the Agricultural Economic Research Institute of the University of Oxford, where she remained until 1939. She then returned to Newnham College as a lecturer, and became Director of Studies in Economics.

In September 1939, the Second World War broke out. Shortly after Cohen's return she was called to London for war service at the Ministry of Food and then at the Board of Trade.

At the end of the war, she returned to Cambridge to teach in economics, a role she held until 1972.

She was elected Principal of Newnham College in 1954, Chair of the Ministry of Agriculture Committee for the Provincial Agricultural Advisory Service in 1962, and was appointed a CBE in 1969.

After her retirement, from 1973 to 1987, she served as a Labour Councillor for Newnham Ward on Cambridge City Council, chairing the Finance Committee and being active on the Development Control Sub-committee.

Within economics, in addition to her own published output (see below), Phyllis Deane argues that her major contribution may well have been her revelation of the fatal flaw (or from another perspective, awkward anomaly) in neoclassical capital theory.

== Key works ==
- (1930) Factors affecting the price and production of potatoes
- (1933) Milk marketing schemes and policies
- (with K. A. H. Murray) (1933) The effect of butter and cheese supplies on 'surplus' milk prices
- (with K. A. H. Murray) (1934; supplements 1935, 36, 37, 38) The Planning of Britain's food imports
- (1936) The history of milk prices
- (1940) The Economics of Agriculture
- (1953) Survey of national measures for controlling farm prices in Western European countries
- (with P. L. Cook) (1958) Effects of Mergers

Academic offices
Preceded by Myra Curtis	Principal of Newnham College, Cambridge; 1954—1972	Succeeded by Jean Floud
