= List of statutory instruments of the United Kingdom, 2021 =

This is a list of statutory instruments made in the United Kingdom in the year 2021.

== 1–100 ==
Number	Title
Not Numbered	The Local Government Finance Act 1988 (Non-Domestic Rating Multipliers) (England) Order 2021
1 (W. 1)	The Meat Preparations (Amendment and Transitory Modification) (Wales) (EU Exit) Regulations 2021
2	The FLEGT Licensing Scheme (Council Regulation (EC) No 2173/2005) (Amendment) Regulations 2021
3 (W. 2)	The A55 Trunk Road (Junction 19 (Glan Conwy Interchange), Conwy County Borough) (Temporary Prohibition of Vehicles) Order 2021
4	The Universal Credit (Transitional Provisions) (Claimants previously entitled to a severe disability premium) Amendment Regulations 2021
5	The Short Selling (Notification Thresholds) Regulations 2021
6	The Whole of Government Accounts (Designation of Bodies) Order 2021
7 (W. 3)	The Planning (Wales) Act 2015 (Commencement No. 7) Order 2021
8	The Health Protection (Coronavirus, Restrictions) (No. 3) and (All Tiers) (England) (Amendment) Regulations 2021
9 (W. 4)	The Education (Student Fees, Awards and Support) (Ordinary Residence) (Wales) Regulations 2021
10	The Aviation Safety (Amendment) Regulations 2021
11	The Education and Inspections Act 2006 (Prescribed Education and Training etc) (Amendment) Regulations 2021
12 (W. 5)	The Public Health (Protection from Eviction) (Wales) (Coronavirus) Regulations 2021
13	The Stamp Duty Land Tax (Administration) (Amendment) Regulations 2021
14	The School Admissions (England) (Coronavirus) (Appeals Arrangements) (Amendment) Regulations 2021
15	The Public Health (Coronavirus) (Protection from Eviction) (England) Regulations 2021
16 (W. 6)	The Non-Domestic Rating (Multiplier) (Wales) Order 2021
17	The M27 Motorway (Junctions 4 to 11) (Variable Speed Limits) Regulations 2021
18	The Health Protection (Coronavirus, International Travel) (England) (Amendment) Regulations 2021
19	The Spring Traps Approval (Variation) (England) Order 2021
20 (W. 7)	The Health Protection (Coronavirus, International Travel and Restrictions) (Amendment) (Wales) Regulations 2021
21	The Bank for International Settlements (International Development Act 2002 and Immigration (Exemption from Control) Order 1972) (Amendment) Order 2021
22	The Air Navigation (Restriction of Flying) (West Highland Way) (Emergency) Regulations 2021
23	The Agriculture and Horticulture Development Board (Amendment) Order 2021
24 (W. 8)	The Health Protection (Coronavirus, International Travel) (Wales) (Amendment) Regulations 2021
25	The Health Protection (Coronavirus, International Travel) (England) (Amendment) (No. 2) Regulations 2021
26	The General Pharmaceutical Council (Coronavirus) (Amendment) Rules Order of Council 2021
27	The Health and Care Professions Council (Coronavirus) (Amendment) Rules Order of Council 2021
28	The Markets in Financial Instruments (Switzerland Equivalence) Regulations 2021
29	The Council Tax Reduction Schemes (Prescribed Requirements) (England) (Amendment) Regulations 2021
30	The National Health Service (Performers Lists, Coronavirus) (England) Amendment Regulations 2021
31	Not Allocated
32	Not Allocated
33	The Health and Safety and Nuclear (Fees) Regulations 2021
34 (W. 9)	The Council Tax Reduction Schemes (Prescribed Requirements and Default Scheme) (Wales) (Amendment) Regulations 2021
35	The Chief Regulator of Qualifications and Examinations Order 2021
36	Not Allocated
37	The Libya (Sanctions) (Overseas Territories) Order 2021
38	The Health Protection (Coronavirus, Pre-Departure Testing and Operator Liability) (England) (Amendment) Regulations 2021
39	Not Allocated
40	Not Allocated
41	Not Allocated
42	Not Allocated
43	Not Allocated
44	The Tax Credits Reviews and Appeals (Amendment) Order 2021
45	Not Allocated
46 (W. 10)	The Health Protection (Coronavirus, International Travel and Restrictions) (Amendment) (No. 2) (Wales) Regulations 2021
47	The Health Protection (Coronavirus, International Travel) (England) (Amendment) (No. 3) Regulations 2021
48 (W. 11)	The Health Protection (Coronavirus, International Travel, Pre-Departure Testing and Operator Liability) (Wales) (Amendment) Regulations 2021
49	The Health Protection (Coronavirus, International Travel) (England) (Amendment) (No. 4) Regulations 2021
50 (W. 12)	The Health Protection (Coronavirus, International Travel) (Wales) (Amendment) (No. 2) Regulations 2021
51	The A38 Derby Junctions Development Consent Order 2021
52	The Local Government and Police and Crime Commissioner (Coronavirus) (Postponement of Elections and Referendums) (England and Wales) (Amendment) (England) Regulations 2021
53	The Health Protection (Coronavirus, Restrictions) (All Tiers) (England) (Amendment) Regulations 2021
54	The Trade in Endangered Species of Wild Fauna and Flora (Council Regulation (EC) No 338/97) (Amendment) Regulations 2021
55	The Charities (Exception from Registration) (Amendment) Regulations 2021
56	The Air Navigation (Restriction of Flying) (West Highland Way) (Emergency) (Revocation) Regulations 2021
57 (W. 13)	The Health Protection (Coronavirus Restrictions) (No. 5) (Wales) (Amendment) Regulations 2021
58	The Drivers’ Hours and Tachographs (Temporary Exceptions) Regulations 2021
59	The School and Early Years Finance (England) Regulations 2021
60	The Limited Liability Partnerships (Amendment etc.) Regulations 2021
61 (W. 14)	The Nurse Staffing Levels (Wales) Act 2016 (Commencement No. 2) Order 2021
62	The Heavy Commercial Vehicles in Kent (No. 3) (Amendment) Order 2021
63	The Customs Tariff (Establishment and Suspension of Import Duty) (EU Exit) (Amendment) Regulations 2021
64	The Special Restrictions on Adoptions from Abroad (Nigeria) Order 2021
65	The Social Fund Funeral Expenses Payment (Amendment) Regulations 2021
66 (W. 15)	The Health Protection (Coronavirus, International Travel and Restrictions) (Amendment) (No. 3) (Wales) Regulations 2021
67	Not Allocated
68	The Health Protection (Coronavirus, International Travel, Operator Liability and Public Health Information) (England) (Amendment) Regulations 2021
69 (W. 17)	The A487 Trunk Road (North Parade, Aberystwyth, Ceredigion) (Temporary Prohibition of Vehicles) Order 2021
70	Not Allocated
71	Not Allocated
72 (W. 18)	The Health Protection (Coronavirus, International Travel, Operator Liability and Public Health Information to Travellers) (Wales) (Amendment) Regulations 2021
73 (W. 19)	The Education (Student Support) (Miscellaneous Amendments) (Wales) Regulations 2021
74	The A1 Birtley to Coal House Development Consent Order 2021
75	The Traffic Signs (Coronavirus) (Amendment) (England) Regulations 2021
76	The Domestic Renewable Heat Incentive Scheme and Renewable Heat Incentive Scheme (Amendment) Regulations 2021
77 (W. 20)	The Water Resources (Control of Agricultural Pollution) (Wales) Regulations 2021
78	The Official Controls (Temporary Measures) (Coronavirus) (Amendment) Regulations 2021
79	The Plant Health (Amendment) (EU Exit) Regulations 2021
80	The Criminal Legal Aid (Remuneration) (Amendment) Regulations 2021
81	The Merchant Shipping (Counting and Registration of Persons on Board Passenger Ships) (Amendment) Regulations 2021
82	The M271 Motorway (Junction 1 to Redbridge Roundabout) (Fixed Speed Limits) Regulations 2021
83	The Framework for the Free Flow of Non-Personal Data (Revocation) (EU Exit) Regulations 2021
84 (W. 21)	The A55 Trunk Road (Junction 11 (Llys y Gwynt Interchange), Gwynedd to Junction 15 (Llanfairfechan Roundabout), Conwy) (Temporary Traffic Prohibitions) Order 2021
85 (W. 22)	The A487 Trunk Road (North Parade, Aberystwyth, Ceredigion) (Temporary Prohibition of Vehicles) Order 2021
86 (W. 23)	The A487 Trunk Road (Talybont, Ceredigion) (Temporary Prohibition of Vehicles) Order 2021
87 (W. 24)	The A487 Trunk Road (Layby at Henfynyw, Ceredigion) (Temporary Prohibition of Vehicles) Order 2021
88 (W. 25)	The Local Government (Coronavirus) (Postponement of Elections) (Miscellaneous Amendments) (Wales) Regulations 2021
89	The Pension Schemes (Qualifying Recognised Overseas Pension Schemes) (Gibraltar) (Exclusion of Overseas Transfer Charge) Regulations 2021
90	The Financial Services and Markets Act 2000 (Regulated Activities) (Amendment) Order 2021
91	The Prosecution of Offences (Custody Time Limits) (Coronavirus) (Amendment) Regulations 2021
92	Not Allocated
93	Not Allocated
94	The Organic Control (Amendment) Regulations 2021
95 (W. 26)	The Health Protection (Coronavirus, International Travel and Restrictions) (Amendment) (No. 4) (Wales) Regulations 2021
96	Not Allocated
97	Health Protection (Coronavirus, Restrictions) (All Tiers and Self-Isolation) (England) (Amendment) Regulations 2021
98	The Health Protection (Coronavirus, International Travel) (England) (Amendment) (No. 5) Regulations 2021
99	Not Allocated
100	Not Allocated

== 101–200 ==
Number	Title
101	Not Allocated
102	Not Allocated
103 (W. 28)	The Health Protection (Coronavirus Restrictions) (No. 5) (Wales) (Amendment) (No. 2) Regulations 2021
104	The Airports (Designation) (Removal and Disposal of Vehicles) (Amendment) Order 2021
105	The Airport Byelaws (Designation) Order 2021
106	Not Allocated
107	Not Allocated
108	Not Allocated
109	The Heavy Commercial Vehicles in Kent (No. 3) (Amendment) Order 2021
110	Not Allocated
111	The Income Tax (Indexation) Order 2021
112	The West Yorkshire Combined Authority (Election of Mayor and Functions) Order 2021
113	Not Allocated
114 (W. 29)	The A489 Trunk Road (Machynlleth, Powys) (40 mph Speed Limit) Order 2021
115 (W. 30)	The A487 Trunk Road (Caernarfon Flyover Southbound & Northbound Entry Slip Roads, Caernarfon, Gwynedd) (Temporary Prohibition of Vehicles) Order 2021
116	The M6 Motorway (Junctions 13 to 15) (Variable Speed Limits) Regulations 2021
117 (L. 2)	The Civil Procedure (Amendment) Rules 2021
118 (W. 31)	The Non-Domestic Rating (Unoccupied Property) (Wales) (Amendment) Regulations 2021
119 (W. 32)	The Land Transaction Tax (Specified Amount of Relevant Rent) (Wales) (Amendment) Regulations 2021
120	The Capital Allowances Act 2001 (Car Emissions) (Extension of First-year Allowances) (Amendment) Order 2021
121 (W. 33)	The A483 Trunk Road (Ammanford Road and Pontardulais Road, Tycroes, Carmarthenshire) (Prohibition of Waiting, Loading and Unloading) Order 2021
122	The Education (Coronavirus, Remote Education Information) (England) (Amendment) Regulations 2021
123	Not Allocated
124	The Communications (Television Licensing) (Amendment) Regulations 2021
125	The A303 Sparkford to Ilchester Dualling Development Consent Order 2021
126	The Prosecution of Offences Act 1985 (Specified Proceedings) (Coronavirus) (Amendment) Order 2021
127	The Education (Student Fees, Awards and Support) (Amendment) Regulations 2021
128 (W. 34)	The M4 Motorway (Junction 24 (Coldra) to Junction 28 (Tredegar Park), Newport) (Temporary Speed Restrictions) Order 2021
129	Not Allocated
130	Not Allocated
131	The Loans for Mortgage Interest (Amendment) Regulations 2021
132	The Protection of Trading Interests (Authorisation) Regulations 2021
133	The Air Navigation (Restriction of Flying) (Royal Air Force Syerston) Regulations 2021
134	The Local Government Finance Act 1988 (Non-Domestic Rating Multipliers) (England) Order 2021
135	The Drivers’ Hours and Tachographs (Amendment) Regulations 2021
136	Not Allocated
137	The Health Protection (Coronavirus, International Travel) (England) (Amendment) (No. 6) Regulations 2021
138	Not Allocated
139	Not Allocated
140	The Inspectors of Education, Children's Services and Skills Order 2021
141	Not Allocated
142	Not Allocated
143 (W. 35)	The Neath to Abergavenny Trunk Road (A465) (Abergavenny to Hirwaun Dualling and Slip Roads) and East of Abercynon to East of Dowlais Trunk Road (A4060), Cardiff to Glan Conwy Trunk Road (A470) (Connecting Roads) Order 1999 (Dowlais Top to Hirwaun) (Amendment) Order 2021
144	The Scotland Act 1998 (Agency Arrangements) (Specification) (Overseas Production Orders) Order 2021
145	The Conflict Minerals (Compliance) (Northern Ireland) (EU Exit) (Amendment) Regulations 2021
146 (C. 2)	The Crime (Overseas Production Orders) Act 2019 (Commencement No.2) (Northern Ireland) Regulations 2021
147	The Universal Credit (Work-Related Requirements) In Work Pilot Scheme (Extension) Order 2021
148	The High Speed Rail (West Midlands – Crewe) (Nomination) Regulations 2021
149 (W. 36)	The A477 Trunk Road (St Clears, Carmarthenshire to Pembroke Dock, Pembrokeshire) (Temporary Speed Restrictions & No Overtaking) Order 2021
150	The Health Protection (Coronavirus, International Travel) (England) (Amendment) (No. 7) Regulations 2021
151	The High Speed Rail (West Midlands – Crewe) (Qualifying Authorities) Regulations 2021
152 (W. 37)	The Local Land Charges (Fees) (Wales) Rules 2021
153	The European Grouping of Territorial Cooperation and Limited Liability Partnerships etc. (Revocations and Amendments) (EU Exit) Regulations 2021
154 (W. 38)	The Health Protection (Coronavirus, International Travel) (Wales) (Amendment) (No. 3) Regulations 2021
155	Not Allocated
156	The Tax Credits, Child Benefit and Guardian's Allowance Up-rating Regulations 2021
157	The Social Security (Contributions) (Rates, Limits and Thresholds Amendments and National Insurance Funds Payments) Regulations 2021
158	The Heather and Grass etc. Burning (England) Regulations 2021
159	The Fertilisers and Ammonium Nitrate Material (Amendment) (EU Exit) Regulations 2021
160	The Local and Greater London Authority Elections (Coronavirus, Nomination of Candidates) (Amendment) (England) Rules 2021
161	The Care Planning, Placement and Case Review (England) (Amendment) Regulations 2021
162	Not Allocated
163	Not Allocated
164	The Public Health (Coronavirus) (Protection from Eviction) (England) (No. 2) Regulations 2021
165	The Zoonoses (Amendment) (England) Order 2021
166	The Health Protection (Coronavirus, International Travel) (England) (Amendment) (No. 8) Regulations 2021
167	Not Allocated
168	The Nutrition (Amendment) and Food for Specific Groups (Food for Special Medical Purposes for Infants, Infant Formula and Follow-on Formula) (Information and Compositional Requirements) (Amendment) Regulations 2021
169	The National Health Service (Charges and Pharmaceutical and Local Pharmaceutical Services) (Coronavirus) (Amendment) Regulations 2021
170	Not Allocated
171 (W. 39)	The Health Protection (Coronavirus, Operator Liability and Public Health Information to Travellers) (Wales) (Amendment) Regulations 2021
172 (W. 40)	The Health Protection (Coronavirus Restrictions) (No. 5) (Wales) (Amendment) (No. 3) Regulations 2021
173	The Wheelabrator Kemsley K3 Generating Station Order 2021
174	The Cumbria (Changes to Years of Elections) Order 2021
175	The North Yorkshire (Changes to Years of Elections) Order 2021
176	The Somerset (Change to Year of Election) Order 2021
177	The Employment Rights Act 1996 (Coronavirus, Calculation of a Week's Pay) (Amendment) Regulations 2021
178	The National Health Service (Charges for Drugs and Appliances) (Amendment) Regulations 2021
179	The Police and Crime Commissioner Elections (Returning Officers’ Accounts) (Amendment) Regulations 2021
180 (W. 41)	The A44 Trunk Road (Llangurig, Powys to Ponterwyd, Ceredigion) (30 mph, 40 mph & 50 mph Speed Limits) Order 2021
181 (W. 42) (C. 3)	The Regulation and Inspection of Social Care (Wales) Act 2016 (Commencement No. 7) Order 2021
182	The High Speed Rail (West Midlands – Crewe) (Planning Appeals) (Written Representations Procedure) Regulations 2021
183	The High Speed Rail (West Midlands – Crewe) (Fees for Requests for Planning Approval) Regulations 2021
184	The Immigration (Guidance on Detention of Vulnerable Persons) Regulations 2021
185	The Airports Slot Allocation (Alleviation of Usage Requirements) Regulations 2021
186	The Personal Injuries (NHS Charges) (Amounts) (Amendment) Regulations 2021
187	The Official Controls and Phytosanitary Conditions (Amendment) (No. 2) Regulations 2021
188	The Housing Benefit (Persons who have attained the qualifying age for state pension credit) (Amendment) Regulations 2021
189	The Carbon Accounting (Provision for 2019) Regulations 2021
190	The Scottish Rates of Income Tax (Consequential Amendments) Order 2021
191	The Education (Student Loans) (Repayment) (Amendment) Regulations 2021
192 (W. 43)	The Zoonoses (Amendment) (Wales) Order 2021
193 (W. 44)	The Representation of the People (Amendment) (Wales) (Coronavirus) Regulations 2021
194 (W. 45)	The Political Parties Campaign Expenditure (Senedd Elections) Code of Practice 2020 (Appointed Day) (Wales) Order 2021
195 (C. 4)	The Civil Liability Act 2018 (Commencement No. 1 and Transitional Provision) Regulations 2021
196 (L. 4)	The Civil Procedure (Amendment No. 2) Rules 2021
197	The Restriction of Public Sector Exit Payments (Revocation) Regulations 2021
198 (W. 46)	The Partnership Arrangements (Amendment) and Regulated Services (Market Stability Reports) (Wales) Regulations 2021
199	The Motor Fuel (Composition and Content) and the Biofuel (Labelling) (Amendment) Regulations 2021
200 (W. 47)	The A458 Trunk Road (Raven Roundabout, Welshpool, Powys) (Temporary Prohibition of Vehicles) Order 2021

== 201–300 ==
Number	Title
201 (W. 48)	The M4 Motorway (Junction 34 (Miskin), Rhondda Cynon Taf to Junction 36 (Sarn), Bridgend) (Temporary 40 mph & 50 mph Speed Limits) Order 2021
201 (W. 48)	The M4 Motorway (Junction 34 (Miskin), Rhondda Cynon Taf to Junction 36 (Sarn), Bridgend) (Temporary 40 mph & 50 mph Speed Limits) Order 2021
202 (W. 49) (C. 5)	The Public Health (Wales) Act 2017 (Commencement No. 6) Order 2021
203 (W. 50)	The A458 Trunk Road (Trewern, Powys) (Temporary Prohibition of Vehicles, Cyclists and Pedestrians) Order 2021
204	The School Discipline (Pupil Exclusions and Reviews) (England) (Coronavirus) (Amendment) Regulations 2021
205	The Mandatory Travel Concession (England) (Amendment) Regulations 2021
206	The Oil and Gas Authority (Levy and Fees) Regulations 2021
207	The Fertilisers and Ammonium Nitrate Material (Amendment) (EU Exit) Regulations 2021
208	The Employment Rights (Increase of Limits) Order 2021
209 (W. 51)	The Education (Pupil Referral Units) (Management Committees etc.) (Wales) (Amendment) Regulations 2021
210 (W. 52)	The Health Protection (Coronavirus Restrictions) (No. 5) (Wales) (Amendment) (No. 4) Regulations 2021
211	The Approved Country Lists (Animals and Animal Products) (Amendment) Regulations 2021
212	The Housing (Shared Ownership Leases) (Exclusion from Leasehold Reform Act 1967 and Rent Act 1977) (England) Regulations 2021
213	The UK Property Rich Collective Investment Vehicles (Amendment of the Taxation of Chargeable Gains Act 1992) Regulations 2021
214	The Occupational and Personal Pension Schemes (General Levy) (Amendment) Regulations 2021
215	The Antique Firearms Regulations 2021
216 (W. 53)	The Nurse Staffing Levels (Extension of Situations) (Wales) Regulations 2021
217 (W. 54)	The Independent Schools (Provision of Information) (Wales) (Amendment) Regulations 2021
218	Not Allocated
219	Not Allocated
220	The Uttlesford (Electoral Changes) Order 2021
221 (W. 55)	The National Health Service (Charges to Overseas Visitors) (Amendment) (Wales) (EU Exit) Regulations 2021
222	The Electronic Commerce Directive (Education, Adoption and Children) (Amendment etc.) Regulations 2021
223	The Health Protection (Coronavirus, International Travel) (England) (Amendment) (No. 9) Regulations 2021
224	The Major Sporting Events (Income Tax Exemption) Regulations 2021
225	Not Allocated
226	Not Allocated
227	Not Allocated
228	The Universal Credit (Childcare in Wales) (Amendment) Regulations 2021
229	Not Allocated
230	The Social Security (Claims and Payments, Employment and Support Allowance, Personal Independence Payment and Universal Credit) (Telephone and Video Assessment) (Amendment) Regulations 2021
231 (W. 57) (C. 6)	The Local Government and Elections (Wales) Act 2021 (Commencement No. 1 and Saving Provision) Order 2021
232 (W. 58)	The Velindre National Health Service Trust (Establishment) (Amendment) Order 2021
233 (W. 59)	The Digital Health and Care Wales (Transfer of Staff, Property, Rights and Liabilities) Order 2021
234	Not Allocated
235	Not Allocated
236	The Wildlife and Countryside Act 1981 (Variation of Schedule 9) (England) Order 2021
237 (W. 60)	The Velindre National Health Service Trust Shared Services Committee (Wales) (Amendment) Regulations 2021
238	Not Allocated
239	Not Allocated
240	The Public Service (Civil Servants and Others) Pensions (Amendment) Regulations 2021
241	The Customs Tariff (Preferential Trade Arrangements) (EU Exit) (Amendment) Regulations 2021
242	Not Allocated
243	Not Allocated
244 (C. 7)	The Youth Justice and Criminal Evidence Act 1999 (Commencement No. 21) Order 2021
245	The Annual Tax on Enveloped Dwellings (Indexation of Annual Chargeable Amounts) Order 2021
246	Not Allocated
247	Health Protection (Coronavirus) (Wearing of Face Coverings in a Relevant Place and Restrictions: All Tiers) (England) (Amendment) Regulations 2021
248	The Van Benefit and Car and Van Fuel Benefit Order 2021
249	The Taxes (Interest Rate) (Amendment) Regulations 2021
250	The Wireless Telegraphy (Licence Award) (Amendment) Regulations 2021
251 (W. 65)	The Adoption and Fostering (Wales) (Miscellaneous Amendments) (Coronavirus) (Amendment) Regulations 2021
252	The Health Protection (Coronavirus, International Travel and Information for Passengers) (England) (Amendment) Regulations 2021
253 (W. 66)	The Business Tenancies (Extension of Protection from Forfeiture etc.) (Wales) (Coronavirus) Regulations 2021
254 (W. 67)	The Town and Country Planning (General Permitted Development) (Amendment) (Wales) Order 2021
255 (W. 68)	The Care and Support (Charging) (Wales) (Amendment) Regulations 2021
256	The Guardian's Allowance Up-rating Regulations 2021
257	The Gas (Standards of Performance) (Amendment) Regulations 2021
258	The Police and Crime Commissioner Elections (Designation of Local Authorities) (Amendment) Order 2021
259	The Police and Crime Commissioner Elections (Designation of Police Area Returning Officers) (Amendment) Order 2021
260 (W. 69)	The A4042 Trunk Road (Caerleon Roundabout, Newport to Cwmbran Roundabout, Torfaen) (Temporary Prohibition of Vehicles) Order 2021
261	The Adoption and Children (Coronavirus) (Amendment) Regulations 2021
262	The Non-Domestic Rating (Transitional Protection Payments and Rates Retention) (Coronavirus) (Amendment) Regulations 2021
263	The Accounts and Audit (Amendment) Regulations 2021
264 (W. 70)	The Candidate Election Expenses (Senedd Elections) Code of Practice 2021 (Appointed Day) Order 2021
265	The Government Resources and Accounts Act 2000 (Estimates and Accounts) Order 2021
266	Not Allocated
267	The Social Security Revaluation of Earnings Factors Order 2021
268	The Education (Student Support) (Coronavirus) (Amendment) Regulations 2021
269	The Immigration and Nationality (Fees) (Amendment) Regulations 2021
270	The Mesothelioma Lump Sum Payments (Conditions and Amounts) (Amendment) Regulations 2021
271	The Pneumoconiosis etc. (Workers’ Compensation) (Payment of Claims) (Amendment) Regulations 2021
272	The Northamptonshire (Structural Changes) (Supplementary Provision and Amendment) Order 2021
273	The Riverside Energy Park (Correction) Order 2021
274 (W. 71)	The A40 Trunk Road (Dixton Roundabout to the Wales/England Border, Monmouthshire) (Temporary Prohibition of Vehicles) Order 2021
275	The Pensions Increase (Review) Order 2021
276	The Public Service Pensions Revaluation Order 2021
277	The South Cambridgeshire (Electoral Changes) Order 2021
278	The Public Sector Apprenticeship Targets (Amendment) Regulations 2021
279	The Common Organisation of the Markets in Agricultural Products (Wine) (Amendment, etc.) Regulations 2021
280	The Merchant Shipping (Light Dues) (Amendment) Regulations 2021
281	The Statutory Sick Pay (Coronavirus) (Funding of Employers’ Liabilities) (Amendment) Regulations and the Statutory Sick Pay (Coronavirus) (Funding of Employers’ Liabilities) (Northern Ireland) (Amendment) Regulations 2021
282 (C. 8)	The Policing and Crime Act 2017 (Commencement No. 11 and Transitional Provisions) Regulations 2021
283	The Business Tenancies (Protection from Forfeiture: Relevant Period) (Coronavirus) (England) Regulations 2021
284	The Coronavirus Act 2020 (Residential Tenancies: Protection from Eviction) (Amendment) (England) Regulations 2021
285	Not Allocated
286	The National Health Service Commissioning Board and Clinical Commissioning Groups (Responsibilities and Standing Rules) (Amendment) Regulations 2021
287	The Recovery of Costs (Remand to Youth Detention Accommodation) (Amendment) Regulations 2021
288	The Russia (Sanctions) (Overseas Territories) (Amendment) Order 2021
289	The Armed Forces Act (Continuation) Order 2021
290	The Government of Wales Act 2006 (Amendment) Order 2021
291	The Police and Crime Commissioner Elections (Welsh Forms) Order 2021
292	Not Allocated
293	The Mayoral and Police and Crime Commissioner Elections (Coronavirus, Nomination of Candidates) (Amendment) Order 2021
294	The Air Navigation (Restriction of Flying) (Bethersden) (Emergency) Regulations 2021
295 (W. 72)	The Equality Act 2010 (Authorities subject to a duty regarding Socio-economic Inequalities) (Wales) Regulations 2021
296 (W. 73)	The Local Government and Elections (Wales) Act 2021 (Consequential Amendments) Regulations 2021
297 (C. 9) (W. 74)	The Local Government and Elections (Wales) Act 2021 (Commencement No. 2 and Saving Provisions) Order 2021
298 (C. 10) (W. 75)	The Equality Act 2010 (Commencement No. 15) (Wales) Order 2021
299	The Network Rail (Ferryboat Lane Footbridge Reconstruction) (Land Acquisition) Order 2021
300	The Taking Control of Goods (Amendment) (Coronavirus) Regulations 2021

== 301–400 ==
Number	Title
301	Not Allocated
302	Not Allocated
303 (W. 77)	The A487 Trunk Road (Rhiw Tŷ Neint, north of Corris Uchaf, Gwynedd) (Temporary Prohibition of Vehicles) Order 2021
304	Not Allocated
305 (W. 78)	The Health Protection (Coronavirus, International Travel and Operator Liability) (Miscellaneous Amendments) (Wales) Regulations 2021
306	Not Allocated
307 (W. 79)	The Health Protection (Coronavirus Restrictions) (No. 5) (Wales) (Amendment) (No. 5) Regulations 2021
308	The Social Security Contributions (Intermediaries) (Miscellaneous Amendments) Regulations 2021
309	Not Allocated
310	The Transfer of Functions (Speaker's Committee) Order 2021
311	The Nationality, Immigration and Asylum Act 2002 (Juxtaposed Controls) (Amendment) Order 2021
312	The Social Security Benefits Up-rating Regulations 2021
313	The Universal Credit (Extension of Coronavirus Measures) Regulations 2021
314	The Automatic Enrolment (Earnings Trigger and Qualifying Earnings Band) Order 2021
315 (W. 80)	The Senedd Cymru (Returning Officers’ Charges) Order 2021
316 (W. 81)	The Coronavirus Act 2020 (Suspension: Local Authority Care and Support) (Wales) Regulations 2021
317	The Air Navigation (Restriction of Flying) (Loch Long and the Firth of Clyde) (No. 2) Regulations 2021
318	The Industrial Training (Film Industry Training Board for England and Wales) (Revocation) Order 2021
319 (W. 82)	The A55 Trunk Road (Westbound Carriageway at Junction 17 (Conwy Morfa), Conwy) (Temporary Prohibition of Vehicles) Order 2021
320 (W. 83)	The A55 Trunk Road (Junction 36 (Warren Interchange) to the Wales/England Border, Flintshire) (Temporary Prohibition of Vehicles, Cyclists and Pedestrians) Order 2021
321	The Income Tax (Construction Industry Scheme) (Amendment) Regulations 2021
322 (L. 5)	The Tribunal Procedure (Amendment) Rules 2021
323	The Authority to Carry Scheme and Civil Penalties Regulations 2021
324	The Agricultural Holdings (Transitional Provision) (England) Regulations 2021
325 (W. 84)	The Public Health (Protection from Eviction) (No. 2) (Wales) (Coronavirus) Regulations 2021
326	The Civil Liability (Specification of Authorised Persons) Regulations 2021
327 (W. 85)	The Corporate Joint Committees (General) (Wales) Regulations 2021
328 (W. 86)	The Corporate Joint Committees (Transport Functions) (Wales) Regulations 2021
329	The National Minimum Wage (Amendment) Regulations 2021
330	The Compulsory Electronic Monitoring Licence Condition Order 2021
331	The National Health Service (General Medical Services Contracts and Personal Medical Services Agreements) (Amendment) Regulations 2021
332 (W. 87)	The Climate Change (Carbon Budgets) (Wales) (Amendment) Regulations 2021
333 (W. 88)	The Environment (Wales) Act 2016 (Amendment of 2050 Emissions Target) Regulations 2021
334 (W. 89)	The Climate Change (Net Welsh Emissions Account Credit Limit) (Wales) Regulations 2021
335 (W. 90)	The Senedd Cymru (Representation of the People) (Amendment) Order 2021
336	Not Allocated
337	Not Allocated
338 (W. 92)	The Climate Change (Interim Emissions Targets) (Wales) (Amendment) Regulations 2021
339 (W. 93)	The North Wales Corporate Joint Committee Regulations 2021
340 (W. 94)	The Assessment of Accommodation Needs of Gypsies and Travellers (Extension of Review Period) (Wales) (Coronavirus) Order 2021
341 (W. 95)	The Corporate Joint Committees (Amendment of Schedule 6 to the Welsh Language (Wales) Measure 2011) Regulations 2021
342 (W. 96)	The Mid Wales Corporate Joint Committee Regulations 2021
343 (W. 97)	The South East Wales Corporate Joint Committee Regulations 2021
344 (W. 98)	The Accounts and Audit (Wales) (Amendment) Regulations 2021
345 (W. 99)	The Public Services Ombudsman (Wales) Act 2019 (Amendment of Schedule 3) Regulations 2021
346	Not Allocated
347 (W. 100)	The Equality Act 2010 (Public Authorities subject to the Public Sector Equality Duty) (Wales) Order 2021
348	The Health Protection (Coronavirus, International Travel) (England) (Amendment) (No. 10) Regulations 2021
349 (W. 101)	The Public Audit (Wales) Act 2004 (Amendment) (Local Government Bodies in Wales) Order 2021
350 (W. 102)	The Education Workforce Council (Interim Suspension Orders) (Additional Functions) (Wales) Order 2021
351 (W. 103)	The Bee Diseases and Pests Control (Wales) (Amendment) Order 2021
352 (W. 104)	The South West Wales Corporate Joint Committee Regulations 2021
353 (W. 105)	The Allocation of Housing and Homelessness (Eligibility) (Wales) (Amendment) Regulations 2021
354 (W. 106) (C. 11)	The Local Government and Elections (Wales) Act 2021 (Commencement No. 3 and Transitional Provision) Order 2021
355	The Patents (European Patent with Unitary Effect and Unified Patent Court) (Repeal and Revocation) Regulations 2021
356 (W. 107)	The Local Government and Elections (Wales) Act 2021 (Consequential Amendments and Miscellaneous Provisions) Regulations 2021
357 (W. 108)	The Local Authorities (Executive Arrangements) (Decisions, Documents and Meetings) (Wales) (Amendment) Regulations 2021
358	The Air Navigation (Restriction of Flying) (Air Races) Regulations 2021
359	The Air Navigation (Restriction of Flying) (Old Warden) Regulations 2021
360 (W. 109)	The Town and Country Planning (Strategic Development Plan) (Wales) Regulations 2021
361 (W. 110)	The Health Protection (Coronavirus, International Travel) (Wales) (Amendment) (No. 4) Regulations 2021
362	The Public Health (Coronavirus) (Protection from Eviction) (England) (No. 2) (Amendment) Regulations 2021
363 (W. 111)	The Agricultural Holdings (Units of Production) (Wales) Order 2021
364	Health Protection (Coronavirus, Restrictions) (Steps) (England) Regulations 2021
365	The Abortion (Northern Ireland) Regulations 2021
366	The Meat Preparations (Amendment and Transitory Modification) (England) (EU Exit) (Amendment) Regulations 2021
367 (W. 112)	The Government of Maintained Schools (Training Requirements for Governors) (Wales) (Amendment) Regulations 2021
368 (W. 113)	The Sea Fishing (Penalty Notices) (Wales) (Amendment) Order 2021
369	The Value Added Tax (Section 55A) (Specified Goods and Services and Excepted Supplies) (Amendment) Order 2021
370	The Energy Performance of Buildings (England and Wales) (Amendment) Regulations 2021
371 (W. 114)	The Food, Animal Feed and Seeds (Miscellaneous Amendments and Transitional Provisions) (Wales) (EU Exit) Regulations 2021
372	Not Allocated
373 (C. 12) (W. 116)	The Additional Learning Needs and Education Tribunal (Wales) Act 2018 (Commencement No. 2) Order 2021
374	The Access to the Countryside (Coastal Margin) (Whitehaven to Silecroft) Order 2021
375	The Corporate Insolvency and Governance Act 2020 (Coronavirus) (Extension of the Relevant Period) Regulations 2021
376 (W. 117)	The Meat Preparations (Amendment and Transitory Modification) (Wales) (EU Exit) (Amendment) Regulations 2021
377	Not Allocated
378	The Spring Traps Approval (Variation) (England) (No. 2) Order 2021
379 (W. 119)	The A44 Trunk Road (Capel Bangor to Blaengeuffordd, Ceredigion) (40 mph & Part-time 20 mph Speed Limits) Order 2021
380	The Customs (Tariff etc.) (Amendment) Regulations 2021
381 (W. 120) (C. 13)	The Additional Learning Needs and Education Tribunal (Wales) Act 2018 (Commencement No. 3 and Transitional and Saving Provisions) Order 2021
382	The Customs Tariff (Preferential Trade Arrangements and Tariff Quotas) (EU Exit) (Amendment) Regulations 2021
383 (W. 121) (C. 14)	The Additional Learning Needs and Education Tribunal (Wales) Act 2018 (Commencement No. 4 and Transitional and Saving Provisions) Order 2021
384 (W. 122)	The Trade in Animals and Related Products (Wales) (Amendment) (EU Exit) Regulations 2021
385	The Education (Coronavirus) (School Teachers’ Qualifications, Induction, Inspection Arrangements, Etc) (Amendment) Regulations 2021
386 (W. 123)	The Town and Country Planning (General Permitted Development) (Amendment) (No. 2) (Wales) Order 2021
387	Not Allocated
388 (W. 124)	The A470 Trunk Road (Newbridge-on-Wye, Powys) (Part-time 20 mph Speed Limit) Order 2021
389 (W. 125)	The A55 Trunk Road (Junction 12 (Tal-y-bont) to Junction 13 (Abergwyngregyn), Gwynedd) (Temporary Traffic Restriction & Prohibitions) Order 2021
390	The Police and Crime Commissioner Elections (Local Returning Officers’ and Police Area Returning Officers’ Charges) Order 2021
391	The Representation of the People (Proxy Vote Applications) (Coronavirus) Regulations 2021
392	The Money Laundering and Terrorist Financing (Amendment) (High-Risk Countries) Regulations 2021
393	The Vegetable and Ornamental Plant Propagating Material and Fodder Plant Seed (Amendment) Regulations 2021
394	Not Allocated
395	Not Allocated
396	Not Allocated
397	Not Allocated
398	The Valuation for Rating (Coronavirus) (England) Regulations 2021
399	Not Allocated
400 (W. 129)	The Agricultural Support (Miscellaneous Amendments) (Wales) (EU Exit) Regulations 2021

== 401–500 ==
Number	Title
401	Not Allocated
402	Not Allocated
403	Not Allocated
404	The Non-Domestic Rating (Designated Area) Regulations 2021
405	The Agriculture (Financial Assistance) Regulations 2021
406	Not Allocated
407	The Direct Payments to Farmers (Reductions and Simplifications) (England) (Amendment) Regulations 2021
408	The Financial Reporting Council (Miscellaneous Provisions) Order 2021
409	The Grants to the Churches Conservation Trust Order 2021
410	Not Allocated
411	Not Allocated
412	Not Allocated
413 (W. 133)	The Health Protection (Coronavirus Restrictions) (No. 5) (Wales) (Amendment) (No. 6) Regulations 2021
414 (W. 134)	The Additional Learning Needs Code (Appointed Day) (Wales) Order 2021
415	The Renewables Obligation (Amendment) Order 2021
416 (W. 135)	The Animal Welfare (Licensing of Activities Involving Animals) (Wales) Regulations 2021
417	Not Allocated
418	Not Allocated
419	Not Allocated
420	The Bee Diseases and Pests Control (England) (Amendment) Order 2021
421	Not Allocated
422	The Restriction of the Use of Certain Hazardous Substances in Electrical and Electronic Equipment (Amendment) Regulations 2021
423 (W. 136)	The A470 Trunk Road (Pontypridd, Rhondda Cynon Taf) (Temporary 50 mph Speed Limit) Order 2021
424	Not Allocated
425	Not Allocated
426	The Official Controls, Plant Health, Seeds and Seed Potatoes (Amendment etc.) Regulations 2021
427	Not Allocated
428	Not Allocated
429	Not Allocated
430 (W. 137)	The A483 Trunk Road (Pontardulais Road, Tycroes, Carmarthenshire) (Prohibition of Waiting and Stopping) Order 2021
431 (W. 138)	The A470 & A489 Trunk Roads (Moat Lane Junction, Caersws, Powys) (Temporary 40 mph Speed Limit & No Overtaking) Order 2021
432	Not Allocated
433	Not Allocated
434 (W. 139)	The London to Fishguard Trunk Road (A40) (Llanddewi Velfrey to Penblewin Improvement and De-Trunking) Order 2021
435	Not Allocated
436	Not Allocated
437 (W. 140)	The London to Fishguard Trunk Road (A40) (Penblewin to Redstone Cross Improvement and De-Trunking) Order 2021
438 (W. 141)	The A494 Trunk Road (High Street, Bala, Gwynedd) (Prohibition and Restriction of Waiting) Order 2021
439	The Energy Performance of Buildings (England and Wales) (Amendment) Regulations 2021
440	The Marriage and Civil Partnership (Conversion of Civil Partnership and Fees) (Amendment) Regulations 2021
441	The Corporate Insolvency and Governance Act 2020 (Coronavirus) (Change of Expiry Date) Regulations 2021
442	The Health Protection (Coronavirus, International Travel) (England) (Amendment) (No. 11) Regulations 2021
443	The Specified Diseases (Notification and Control) (Amendment, etc.) (England) Order 2021
444	The Judicial Pensions (Fee-Paid Judges) (Amendment) Regulations 2021
445 (C. 16)	The Finance Act 2009, Sections 101 and 102 (Social Security Contributions, Intermediaries) (Appointed Day) Order 2021
446	The National College for Advanced Transport and Infrastructure (Designated Institution in Further Education and Revocations) Order 2021
447	The Health Protection (Coronavirus, International Travel) (England) (Amendment) (No. 12) Regulations 2021
448 (W. 142)	The A470 Trunk Road (Rhayader, Powys) (Temporary Prohibition of Vehicles & Cyclists) Order 2021
449	The Air Navigation (Restriction of Flying) (Headcorn) Regulations 2021
450	The Air Navigation (Restriction of Flying) (Ascot) Regulations 2021
451 (W. 143)	The A48 Trunk Road (Meadows Bridge Interchange to Cross Hands Roundabout, Carmarthenshire) (Temporary Prohibition of Vehicles, Cyclists and Pedestrians) Order 2021
452	The Health Protection (Coronavirus, International Travel and Information for Passengers) (England) (Amendment) (No. 2) Regulations 2021
453	The Official Controls (Exemptions from Controls at Border Control Posts) (Amendment) Regulations 2021
454 (W. 144)	The Health Protection (Coronavirus, International Travel) (Wales) (Amendment) (No. 5) Regulations 2021
455	The Health Protection (Coronavirus, Restrictions) (Steps and Local Authority Enforcement Powers) (England) (Amendment) Regulations 2021
456	The Social Security (Claims and Payments) (Amendment) Regulations 2021
457 (W. 145)	The Health Protection (Coronavirus Restrictions) (No. 5) (Wales) (Amendment) (No. 7) Regulations 2021
458	The Scarborough Borough Council (Removal of Pilotage Functions) Order 2021
459	The Magistrates’ Courts (Amendment) Rules 2021
460	The Air Navigation (Restriction of Flying) (Windsor) Regulations 2021
461	The Removal and Disposal of Vehicles (Amendment) (England) Regulations 2021
462 (L. 6)	The Civil Proceedings and Gender Recognition Application Fees (Amendment) Order 2021
463	The Solvency 2 (Credit Risk Adjustment) Regulations 2021
464	The Firearms (Amendment) Rules 2021
465	The Supervision of Accounts and Reports (Prescribed Body) and Companies (Defective Accounts and Reports) (Authorised Person) Order 2021
466	Not Allocated
467	The Town and Country Planning (General Permitted Development) (England) (Amendment) (Coronavirus) Order 2021
468	The River Tyne (Tunnels) (Revision of Tolls) Order 2021
469	The Air Navigation (Restriction of Flying) (Windsor) (No. 2) Regulations 2021
470	The Protection of Wrecks (RMS Titanic) (Amendment) Order 2021
471	The East Anglia THREE Offshore Wind Farm (Amendment) Order 2021
472	The Air Navigation (Restriction of Flying) (Wimbledon) Regulations 2021
473	The Air Navigation (Restriction of Flying) (Cleethorpes) Regulations 2021
474	The Air Navigation (Restriction of Flying) (Teignmouth) Regulations 2021
475	The Air Navigation (Restriction of Flying) (Old Warden) (Amendment) Regulations 2021
476	The Social Security (Coronavirus) (Miscellaneous Amendments) Regulations 2021
477	Not Allocated
478	The Customs (Miscellaneous Amendments) Regulations 2021
479	The Education (National Curriculum) (Key Stages 1 and 2 Assessment Arrangements) (England) (Coronavirus) (Amendment) Order 2021
480 (W. 147)	The Animal Diseases (Miscellaneous Amendments) (Wales) Order 2021
481 (W. 148)	The Education (Student Finance) (Miscellaneous Amendments) (Wales) (EU Exit) Regulations 2021
482	The Education (Pupil Information) (England) (Coronavirus) (Amendment) Regulations 2021
483	The Taxation Cross-border Trade (Northern Ireland) (EU Exit) (Amendment) Regulations 2021
484	The Greenhouse Gas Emissions Trading Scheme Auctioning Regulations 2021
485	Not Allocated
486	The Coronavirus Act 2020 (Suspension: Temporary Judicial Commissioners, Urgent Warrants, and Disposal of Bodies) Regulations 2021
487	The Employment Rights Act 1996 (Coronavirus, Calculation of a Week's Pay) (Amendment) (No. 2) Regulations 2021
488	Not Allocated
489	Not Allocated
490	Not Allocated
491	Not Allocated
492	Not Allocated
493	Not Allocated
494	The Recognised Auction Platforms (Amendment and Miscellaneous Provisions) Regulations 2021
495	The Social Security and Tax Credits (Miscellaneous and Coronavirus Amendments) Regulations 2021
496	Not Allocated
497	The Criminal Legal Aid (Remuneration) (Amendment) (No. 2) Regulations 2021
498	The Health Protection (Coronavirus, International Travel) (England) (Amendment) (No. 13) Regulations 2021
499	Not Allocated
500 (W. 149)	The Health Protection (Coronavirus, International Travel) (Wales) (Amendment) (No. 6) Regulations 2021

== 501–600 ==
Number	Title
501	The Terrorism Act 2000 (Proscribed Organisations) (Amendment) Order 2021
502 (W. 150)	The Health Protection (Coronavirus Restrictions) (No. 5) (Wales) (Amendment) (No. 8) Regulations 2021
503	The Air Navigation (Restriction of Flying) (Cornwall) Regulations 2021
504	The National Health Service Trust (Scrutiny of Deaths) (England) Order 2021
505 (L. 7)	The Family Court (Composition and Distribution of Business) (Amendment) Rules 2021
506	The Pension (Non-Taxable Payments Following Death) (Real Time Information) Regulations 2021
507 (W. 151)	The A40 Trunk Road (Raglan to Monmouth, Monmouthshire) (Temporary Prohibition of Vehicles) Order 2021
508	The Vaccine Damage Payments (Specified Disease) (Amendment) Order 2021
509	The Antarctic (Amendment) Regulations 2021
510	The Electricity (Individual Exemption from the Requirement for a Generation Licence) (Kype Muir Extension Wind Farm) Order 2021
511	The Greenhouse Gas Emissions (Kyoto Protocol Registry) Regulations 2021
512 (W. 152)	The A465, A470 & A4060 Trunk Roads (Various Locations between Rhymney Interchange, Caerphilly County Borough and Glynneath Interchange, Neath Port Talbot) (Temporary Traffic Prohibitions & Restrictions) Order 2021
513	The Recognised Auction Platforms and Greenhouse Gas Emissions Trading Scheme Auctioning (Amendment) Regulations 2021
514	The Air Navigation (Restriction of Flying) (Crawley) (Emergency) Regulations 2021
515	Chinnor and Princes Risborough Railway (Chinnor Branch and Risborough Sidings) Order 2021
516 (W. 153) (C. 17)	The Additional Learning Needs and Education Tribunal (Wales) Act 2018 (Commencement No. 3 and No. 4 and Transitional and Saving Provisions) (Amendment) Order 2021
517	The Air Navigation (Restriction of Flying) (Crawley) (Emergency) (Revocation) Regulations 2021
518	The Assured Tenancies and Agricultural Occupancies (Forms) (Moratorium Debt) (Consequential Amendment) (England) Regulations 2021
519	The Climate and Energy (Revocation) (EU Exit) Regulations 2021
520	The Customs Tariff (Establishment) (EU Exit) (Amendment) Regulations 2021
521	The G7 Presidency (Immunities and Privileges) Order 2021
522	The Inspectors of Education, Children's Services and Skills (No. 2) Order 2021
523	The British Nationality (Maldives) Order 2021
524	The Air Navigation (Overseas Territories) (Amendment) Order 2021
525	The Global Anti-Corruption Sanctions (Overseas Territories) Order 2021
526	The Global Anti-Corruption Sanctions (Isle of Man) Order 2021
527	The Customs Tariff (Preferential Trade Arrangements and Tariff Quotas) (EU Exit) (Amendment No. 2) Regulations 2021
528	The Myanmar (Sanctions) (Overseas Territories) Order 2021
529	The Myanmar (Sanctions) (Isle of Man) Order 2021
530	The Extradition Act 2003 (Codes of Practice and Transit Code of Practice) Order 2021
531	The Nursing and Midwifery (European Qualifications) (Amendment) Regulations 2021
532 (C. 18)	The Anti-social Behaviour, Crime and Policing Act 2014 (Commencement No. 11) Order 2021
533	The Bank for International Settlements (Immunities and Privileges) Order 2021
534	The Air Navigation (Carbon Offsetting and Reduction Scheme for International Aviation) Order 2021
535	The Rampion Offshore Wind Farm (Amendment) Order 2021
536	The Air Navigation (Restriction of Flying) (Jet Formation Display Teams) Regulations 2021
537	The Driving Licences (Exchangeable Licences) Order 2021
538	The Marriage (Keeping of Records in Churches and Chapels) Regulations 2021
539	The Marriage (Authorised Persons) Regulations 2021
540	The Street Works (Charges for Occupation of the Highway) (Transport for London) Order 2021
541	The Education (School Day and School Year) (England) (Coronavirus) (Amendment) Regulations 2021
542 (W. 154)	The Health Protection (Coronavirus Restrictions) (No. 5) (Wales) (Amendment) (No. 9) Regulations 2021
543	The Fluorinated Greenhouse Gases (Amendment) (EU Exit) Regulations 2021
544	The Air Navigation (Restriction of Flying) (Hampden Stadium) Regulations 2021
545	The Church of England (Miscellaneous Provisions) Measure 2020 (Commencement No. 2) Order 2021
546	The Housing Benefit and Universal Credit (Care Leavers and Homeless) (Amendment) Regulations 2021
547	The Elected Local Policing Bodies (Specified Information) (Amendment) Order 2021
548	The Wildlife and Countryside Act 1981 (Variation of Schedule 9) (England) (No. 2) Order 2021
549	The Air Navigation (Restriction of Flying) (Duxford) Regulations 2021
550 (C. 19)	The Trade Act 2021 (Commencement No. 1 and Expiry Provision) Regulations 2021
551	The A1 Birtley to Coal House Development Consent (Correction) Order 2021
552	The Road Tunnel Safety (Amendment) Regulations 2021
553 (L. 8)	The Civil Procedure (Amendment No. 3) Rules 2021
554	The Legislative Reform (Church of England Pensions) Order 2021
555	The Health Protection (Coronavirus, International Travel) (England) (Amendment) (No. 14) Regulations 2021
556	The Payments to the Churches Conservation Trust Order 2021
557	The Clergy Discipline (Amendment) Rules 2021
558	The Capital Requirements Regulation (Amendment) (EU Exit) Regulations 2021
559	The Power to Award Degrees etc. (Lamda Limited) Order 2021
560	The European Union (European Schools) Regulations 2021
561	The Greenhouse Gas Emissions Trading Scheme Auctioning (Amendment) Regulations 2021
562	The Assured Tenancies and Agricultural Occupancies (Forms) (England) (Amendment) and Suspension (Coronavirus) Regulations 2021
563	The Air Navigation (Restriction of Flying) (Sywell, Flying Legends) Regulations 2021
564	The Coronavirus Act 2020 (Residential Tenancies: Protection from Eviction) (Amendment) (England) (No. 2) Regulations 2021
565	The Accounts and Audit (Amendment No. 2) Regulations 2021
566	The Financial Services and Markets Act 2000 (Collective Investment Schemes) (Amendment) Order 2021
567 (W. 155)	The A483 Trunk Road (Cilyrychen Level Crossing, Llandybie, Carmarthenshire) (Temporary Prohibition of Vehicles) Order 2021
568 (W. 156)	The Health Protection (Coronavirus, International Travel) (Wales) (Amendment) (No. 7) Regulations 2021
569 (W. 157)	The A483 Trunk Road (Ffairfach Level Crossing, Ffairfach, Carmarthenshire) (Temporary Prohibition of Vehicles) Order 2021
570	The School Information (England) (Amendment) Regulations 2021
571	Health Protection (Coronavirus, International Travel) (England) (Amendment) (No. 15) Regulations 2021
572	The St. Ives (G7 Summit 2021) Harbour Revision Order 2021
573	The Public Procurement (Agreement on Government Procurement) (Amendment) Regulations 2021
574	The Recognition of Professional Qualifications (Amendment etc.) (EU Exit) Regulations 2021
575	The Air Navigation (Restriction of Flying) (Royal Air Force Coningsby) Regulations 2021
576 (W. 158)	The A465 Trunk Road (Llanvihangel Crucorney to Pandy, Monmouthshire) (40 mph & 50 mph Speed Limits) Order 2021
577	The Air Navigation (Restriction of Flying) (Royal St George's Golf Course) Regulations 2021
578 (W. 159)	The A458 Trunk Road (Welshpool, Powys) (40 mph Speed Limit) Order 2021
579	The Valuation Tribunal for England (Council Tax and Rating Appeals) (Procedure) (Amendment) Regulations 2021
580	The Air Navigation (Restriction of Flying) (Wembley Stadium) Regulations 2021
581	The Immingham Open Cycle Gas Turbine (Correction) Order 2021
582	Health Protection (Coronavirus, International Travel and Operator Liability) (England) Regulations 2021
583 (W. 160)	The Health Protection (Coronavirus Restrictions) (No. 5) (Wales) (Amendment) (No. 10) Regulations 2021
584 (W. 161)	The Health Protection (Coronavirus, International Travel, Operator Liability and Public Health Information to Travellers) (Wales) (Miscellaneous Amendments) Regulations 2021
585	Health Protection (Coronavirus, Restrictions) (Steps and Other Provisions) (England) (Amendment) Regulations 2021
586	The Export Control (Amendment) Order 2021
587	The Bournemouth-Swanage Motor Road and Ferry (Revision of Tolls) Order 2021
588 (L. 9)	The Civil Proceedings Fees (Amendment) Order 2021
589	The Health Protection (Coronavirus, International Travel and Operator Liability) (England) (Amendment) Regulations 2021
590	The Air Navigation (Restriction of Flying) (Stonehenge) Regulations 2021
591 (W. 162)	The A465 Trunk Road (Ebbw Vale West Junction, Blaenau Gwent to Hardwick Roundabout, Monmouthshire) (Temporary Traffic Prohibitions and Restrictions) Order 2021
592	The Merchant Shipping (Cargo Ship) (Bilge Alarm) Regulations 2021
593	The Diocese of York (Educational Endowments) (Ingleby Arncliffe Church of England Primary School) Order 2021
594	The Civil Liability Act 2018 (Financial Conduct Authority) (Whiplash) Regulations 2021
595	The Transfer of Undertakings (Protection of Employment) (Transfer of Staff to the Civil Aviation Authority) Regulations 2021
596	The Highways England M58 Junction 1 Improvement (Special Roads) Scheme 2020 Confirmation Instrument 2021
597 (C. 20)	The Agriculture Act 2020 (Commencement No. 1 and Transitional Provision) (England) Regulations 2021
598	The Single Use Carrier Bags Charges (England) (Amendment) Order 2021
599	The Hornsea Three Offshore Wind Farm (Correction) Order 2021
600	The Immigration (Control of Entry through Republic of Ireland) (Amendment) Order 2021

== 601–700 ==
Number	Title
601	The Regulation of Investigatory Powers (Criminal Conduct Authorisations) (Amendment) Order 2021
602	Not Allocated
603	The Air Navigation (Restriction of Flying) (Potters Field Park) Regulations 2021
604	The Air Navigation (Restriction of Flying) (Silverstone and Turweston) Regulations 2021
605 (C. 21)	The Covert Human Intelligence Sources (Criminal Conduct) Act 2021 (Commencement and Transitional Provisions) Regulations 2021
606	The Able Marine Energy Park Development Consent (Amendment) Order 2021
607	The A303 Sparkford to Ilchester Dualling Development Consent (Correction) Order 2021
608	The Stoke-on-Trent City Council (Grange Canal Bridge) Scheme 2020 Confirmation Instrument 2021
609	The International Accounting Standards (Delegation of Functions) (EU Exit) Regulations 2021
610 (C. 22)	The Medicines and Medical Devices Act 2021 (Commencement No. 1 and Transitional and Savings Provision) Regulations 2021
611	The Local Authorities (Capital Finance and Accounting) (England) (Amendment) Regulations 2021
612 (W. 163)	The Relaxation of School Reporting Requirements (Wales) (Coronavirus) Regulations 2021
613	The London Borough of Newham (Electoral Changes) Order 2021
614	The Aviation Safety (Amendment) (No. 2) Regulations 2021
615	The London Borough of Waltham Forest (Electoral Changes) Order 2021
616	The Food (Amendment and Transitional Provisions) (England) Regulations 2021
617	The Town and Country Planning (Control of Advertisements) (England) (Amendment) Regulations 2021
618	The Employment Rights Act 1996 (Protection from Detriment in Health and Safety Cases) (Amendment) Order 2021
619	The Agricultural Holdings (Requests for Landlord's Consent or Variation of Terms and the Suitability Test) (England) Regulations 2021
620 (C. 23)	The Pension Schemes Act 2021 (Commencement No. 1) Regulations 2021
621 (C. 24)	The Crime and Security Act 2010 (Commencement No. 8) Order 2021
622 (C. 25)	The Counter-Terrorism and Border Security Act 2019 (Commencement No. 1) (Northern Ireland) Regulations 2021
623	The Plant Health etc. (Miscellaneous Fees) (Amendment) (England) Regulations 2021
624	The Air Quality (Legislative Functions) (Amendment) Regulations 2021
625	The Plant Health etc. (Fees) (England) (Amendment) Regulations 2021
626 (L. 10)	The Magistrates’ Courts (Amendment No. 2) Rules 2021
627	The Air Navigation (Restriction of Flying) (Helicopter Flight) Regulations 2021
628 (C. 26)	The Sanctions and Anti-Money Laundering Act 2018 (Commencement No. 3) Regulations 2021
629	The Taxation of Chargeable Gains (Gilt-edged Securities) Order 2021
630	The Child Benefit (General) (Coronavirus) (Amendment) Regulations 2021
631	The National Health Service Pension Schemes and Injury Benefits (Amendment) Regulations 2021
632	The Food and Drink (Miscellaneous Amendments Relating to Food and Wine Composition, Information and Labelling) Regulations 2021
633	The Double Taxation Relief (Sweden) Order 2021
634	The Double Taxation Relief (Federal Republic of Germany) Order 2021
635	The Chief Inspector of Education, Children's Services and Skills Order 2021
636	Not Allocated
637	Not Allocated
638	Not Allocated
639	Not Allocated
640	Not Allocated
641	The Phytosanitary Conditions (Amendment) Regulations 2021
642	The Whiplash Injury Regulations 2021
643	Not Allocated
644	Not Allocated
645	Not Allocated
646 (W. 166)	The Health Protection (Coronavirus, International Travel, Operator Liability and Public Health Information to Travellers) (Wales) (Miscellaneous Amendments) (No. 2) Regulations 2021
647	The Air Navigation (Restriction of Flying) (Air Races) (Amendment) Regulations 2021
648	The Air Navigation (Restriction of Flying) (Hampden Stadium) (Amendment) Regulations 2021
649	Not Allocated
650	The Air Navigation (Restriction of Flying) (Royal St George's Golf Course) (Amendment) Regulations 2021
651	The Electricity Trading (Development of Technical Procedures) (Day-Ahead Market Timeframe) Regulations 2021
652	The Common Organisation of the Markets in Agricultural Products (Transitional Arrangements) (Amendment) Regulations 2021
653	The Air Navigation (Restriction of Flying) (Cleethorpes) (Revocation) Regulations 2021
654	The Air Navigation (Restriction of Flying) (Teignmouth) (Revocation) Regulations 2021
655	The Air Navigation (Restriction of Flying) (Jet Formation Display Teams) (Amendment) Regulations 2021
656	The Combined Heat and Power Quality Assurance (Temporary Modifications) Regulations 2021
657	The Air Navigation (Restriction of Flying) (Belavia) Regulations 2021
658	The Air Navigation (Restriction of Flying) (St Austell and Penzance) Regulations 2021
659	The Air Navigation (Restriction of Flying) (Cornwall) (Amendment) Regulations 2021
660	The Plant Health (Fees) (Forestry) (England) (Amendment) Regulations 2021
661	The Customs Tariff (Establishment) (EU Exit) (Amendment) (No. 2) Regulations 2021
662 (W. 167)	The A470 & A489 Trunk Roads (Moat Lane Junction, Caersws, Powys) (40 mph Speed Limit) Order 2021
663	The Air Navigation (Restriction of Flying) (Silverstone and Turweston) (Amendment) Regulations 2021
664 (W. 168)	The M4 Motorway & A470 Trunk Road (Coryton Interchange, Cardiff to Cefn Coed Roundabout, Merthyr Tydfil) (Temporary Prohibition of Vehicles & Cyclists) Order 2021
665	The Allocation of Housing and Homelessness (Eligibility) (England) (Amendment) Regulations 2021
666	The Queen Elizabeth II Conference Centre Trading Fund (Variation) Order 2021
667	The Warm Home Discount (Miscellaneous Amendments) Regulations 2021
668 (W. 169)	The Health Protection (Coronavirus Restrictions) (No. 5) (Wales) (Amendment) (No. 11) Regulations 2021
669 (W. 170)	The Health Protection (Coronavirus, International Travel) (Wales) (Amendment) (No. 8) Regulations 2021
670	The Health Protection (Coronavirus, International Travel and Operator Liability) (England) (Amendment) (No. 2) Regulations 2021
671 (C. 27)	The Financial Services Act 2021 (Commencement No. 1) Regulations 2021
672	The Insolvency (England and Wales) (Amendment) Rules 2021
673	The Insolvency Proceedings (Monetary Limits) (Amendment) Order 2021
674	The Childcare (Early Years Provision Free of Charge) (Extended Entitlement) (Amendment) Regulations 2021
675	The Climate Change Levy (General) (Amendment and Modification) Regulations 2021
676	The Hydrocarbon Oil Duties (Reliefs for Electricity Generation) (Amendment and Modification) Regulations 2021
677	The Education (Student Loans) (Repayment) (Amendment) (No. 2) Regulations 2021
678 (C. 28)	The Overseas Operations (Service Personnel and Veterans) Act 2021 (Commencement) Regulations 2021
679 (W. 171)	The A5 Trunk Road (Glyndyfrdwy, Denbighshire) (30 mph Speed Limit) Order 2021
680 (C. 29)	The Digital Economy Act 2017 (Commencement No. 1) (Northern Ireland) Regulations 2021
681	The Official Controls (Temporary Measures) (Coronavirus) (Amendment) (No. 2) Regulations 2021
682	The Health Protection (Coronavirus, Testing Requirements and Standards) (England) (Amendment) Regulations 2021
683	The Air Navigation (Restriction of Flying) (Royal Air Force Mildenhall) Regulations 2021
684	The Public Lending Right Scheme 1982 (Commencement of Variations) (Northern Ireland) Order 2021
685	The Air Navigation (Restriction of Flying) (St Austell and Penzance) (Amendment) Regulations 2021
686 (W. 172)	The Health Protection (Coronavirus Restrictions) (No. 5) (Wales) (Amendment) (No. 12) Regulations 2021
687	The Air Navigation (Restriction of Flying) (Sywell, Flying Legends) (Revocation) Regulations 2021
688	The Air Navigation (Restriction of Flying) (London Heathrow Airport and Windsor) Regulations 2021
689	The Immigration (Restrictions on Employment and Residential Accommodation) (Prescribed Requirements and Codes of Practice) and Licensing Act 2003 (Personal and Premises Licences) (Forms) Order 2021
690 (C. 30)	The Customs Tariff (Establishment) (EU Exit) (Amendment) (No. 2) Regulations 2021 (Appointed Day) Regulations 2021
691	The Air Navigation (Restriction of Flying) (Royal Air Force Mildenhall) (Amendment) Regulations 2021
692	The Great Yarmouth Third River Crossing Development Consent (Correction) Order 2021
693	The Customs Tariff (Preferential Trade Arrangements and Tariff Quotas) (EU Exit) (Amendment) (No. 3) Regulations 2021
694	The Offshore Installations (Safety Zones) Order 2021
695	The Customs (Declaration Modification) Regulations 2021
696 (W. 173)	The A5 Trunk Road (Near Llyn Ogwen, Gwynedd) (Temporary Speed Limits and Clearway) Order 2021
697	The Taxation (Cross-border Trade) (Miscellaneous Amendments) (EU Exit) Regulations 2021
698	The Sea Fisheries (Amendment etc.) Regulations 2021
699 (W. 174)	The M4 Motorway (Junction 25A (Grove Park) to Junction 28 (Tredegar Park), Newport) (Temporary Prohibition of Vehicles with a weight in excess of 44 Tonnes) Order 2021
700 (W. 175)	The A4042 Trunk Road (Little Mill, West of Usk to Hardwick Roundabout, Monmouthshire) (Temporary Prohibition of Vehicles) Order 2021

== 701–800 ==
Number	Title
701	The Gambling (Operating Licence and Single-Machine Permit Fees) (Amendment) Regulations 2021
702 (W. 176)	The A55 Trunk Road (Junction 1 (Kingsland Roundabout), Holyhead to Junction 6 (Nant Turnpike), Anglesey) (Temporary Prohibition of Traffic) Order 2021
703	The Air Navigation (Restriction of Flying) (Raymill House, Lacock) (Restricted Area EG R106) Regulations 2021
704	The Corporation Tax (Carry Back of Losses: Temporary Extension) Regulations 2021
705	Health Protection (Coronavirus, Restrictions) (Steps and Other Provisions) (England) (Amendment) (No. 2) Regulations 2021
706 (C. 31)	The United Kingdom Internal Market Act 2020 (Commencement No. 2) Regulations 2021
707 (W. 177)	The A40 Trunk Road (St Clears to Carmarthen, Carmarthenshire) (Temporary Traffic Prohibitions) Order 2021
708 (W. 178)	The Coronavirus Act 2020 (Residential Tenancies: Extension of Period of Protection from Eviction) (No. 2) (Wales) Regulations 2021
709 (W. 179)	The Spring Traps Approval (Variation) (Wales) Order 2021
710 (W. 180)	The Plant Health (Fees) (Forestry) (Wales) (Amendment) Regulations 2021
711	The Mobile Homes (Requirement for Manager of Site to be Fit and Proper Person) (England) (Amendment) Regulations 2021
712 (C. 32)	The NHS (Charitable Trusts Etc) Act 2016 (Commencement) Regulations 2021
713 (W. 181)	The Plant Health etc. (Fees) (Wales) (Amendment) Regulations 2021
714	Not Allocated
715	Not Allocated
716	The Payment and Electronic Money Institution Insolvency Regulations 2021
717	The Care and Support (Charging and Assessment of Resources) (Amendment) Regulations 2021
718	The Corporate Insolvency and Governance Act 2020 (Coronavirus) (Extension of the Relevant Period) (No. 2) Regulations 2021
719	Not Allocated
720	The Motor Vehicles (International Motor Insurance Card) (Amendment) Regulations 2021
721 (W. 182)	The A483 Trunk Road (Llanelwedd, Powys) (Part-time 20 mph Speed Limit) Order 2021
722 (W. 183)	The Health Protection (Coronavirus Restrictions) (No. 5) (Wales) (Amendment) (No. 13) Regulations 2021
723	The Prosecution of Offences Act 1985 (Specified Proceedings) (Coronavirus) (Amendment) (No. 2) Order 2021
724 (C. 33)	The Criminal Finances Act 2017 (Commencement No. 5) Regulations 2021
725	The Air Navigation (Restriction of Flying) (East Kirkby, Lincolnshire) Regulations 2021
726	The Proceeds of Crime Act 2002 (Investigations: Code of Practice) Order 2021
727	The Proceeds of Crime Act 2002 (Recovery of Listed Assets: Code of Practice) Regulations 2021
728	The Proceeds of Crime Act 2002 (Cash Searches: Code of Practice) Order 2021
729	The Proceeds of Crime Act 2002 (Search, Seizure and Detention of Property: Code of Practice) (Northern Ireland) Order 2021
730	The Conformity Assessment (Mutual Recognition Agreements) and Weights and Measures (Intoxicating Liquor) (Amendment) Regulations 2021
731	The Health Protection (Coronavirus, International Travel and Operator Liability) (England) (Amendment) (No. 3) Regulations 2021
732	The Business Tenancies (Protection from Forfeiture: Relevant Period) (Coronavirus) (England) (No. 2) Regulations 2021
733	The Asian Development Bank (Twelfth Replenishment of the Asian Development Fund) Order 2021
734	Not Allocated
735 (W. 184) (C. 34)	The Additional Learning Needs and Education Tribunal (Wales) Act 2018 (Amendments to Commencement Orders No. 2, No. 3 and No. 4) Order 2021
736	The Domestic Abuse Act 2021 (Processing of Victims’ Data for Immigration Purposes) (Extension of Relevant Period) Regulations 2021
737 (W. 185)	The A465 Trunk Road (Llangua to Hardwick Roundabout, Abergavenny, Monmouthshire) (Temporary Speed Restrictions & No Overtaking) Order 2021
738	The Child Support (Collection and Enforcement and Maintenance Calculation) (Amendment) Regulations 2021
739 (C. 35)	The Financial Services Act 2021 (Commencement No. 2) Regulations 2021
740	Not Allocated
741	The Pollution Prevention and Control (Fees) (Miscellaneous Amendments) Regulations 2021
742	The Air Navigation (Dangerous Goods) (Amendment) Regulations 2021
743	The British Nationality Act 1981 (Immigration Rules Appendix EU) (Amendment) Regulations 2021
744	The M6 Toll Motorway (M6 Toll Junction T8 to M6 Junction 11a, Staffordshire) (Temporary Prohibition of Traffic) Order 2021
745	The Ecodesign for Energy-Related Products and Energy Information Regulations 2021
746	The Town and Country Planning (Development Management Procedure and Section 62A Applications) (England) (Amendment) Order 2021
747	The Proceeds of Crime Act 2002 (Investigative Powers of Prosecutors: Code of Practice) Order 2021
748 (C. 37)	The Air Traffic Management and Unmanned Aircraft Act 2021 (Commencement No. 1) Regulations 2021
749	The Climate Change Act 2008 (Credit Limit) Order 2021
750	The Carbon Budget Order 2021
751	The Air Navigation (Isle of Man) (Amendment) Order 2021
752 (C. 38)	The Pension Schemes Act 2021 (Commencement No. 2) Regulations 2021
753	The A249 Trunk Road (Stockbury Roundabout Improvements) Order 2021
754	Not Allocated
755	Not Allocated
756	The Common Organisation of the Markets in Agricultural Products (Fruit and Vegetable Producer Organisations, Tariff Quotas and Wine) (Amendment etc.) Regulations 2021
757	Not Allocated
758	Not Allocated
759	Not Allocated
760	Not Allocated
761	Not Allocated
762 (C. 39)	The Offensive Weapons Act 2019 (Commencement No. 2) (England and Wales) Regulations 2021
763	The Child Support (Collection and Enforcement and Maintenance Calculation) (Amendment No. 2) Regulations 2021
764 (C. 40)	Offensive Weapons Act 2019 (Commencement No. 2) (England and Wales) Regulations 2021
765 (W. 187)	The Health Protection (Coronavirus, International Travel and Public Health Information to Travellers) (Wales) (Miscellaneous Amendments) Regulations 2021
766	The Health Protection (Coronavirus, International Travel and Operator Liability) (England) (Amendment) (No. 4) Regulations 2021
767	The Air Navigation (Restriction of Flying) (Helicopter Flight) (No. 2) (Amendment) Regulations 2021
768	The Immigration and Nationality (Fees) (Amendment) Order 2021
769	The Access to the Countryside (Coastal Margin) (Maldon to Salcott) Order 2021
770 (C. 41)	The Finance Act 2021, Section 95 and Schedule 18 (Distance Selling: Northern Ireland) (Appointed Day No. 1 and Transitory Provision) Regulations 2021
771 (C. 42)	The Immigration Act 2014 (Commencement No. 7) Order 2021
772	The Immigration (Collection, Use and Retention of Biometric Information and Related Amendments) Regulations 2021
773	The Competition Act 1998 (Coronavirus) (Public Policy Exclusions) (Revocations) Order 2021
774	The Markets in Financial Instruments (Capital Markets) (Amendment) Regulations 2021
775	The Marriages and Civil Partnerships (Approved Premises) (Amendment) Regulations 2021
776 (W. 188)	The A487 Trunk Road (Aberarth, Ceredigion) (Temporary Prohibition of Vehicles) Order 2021
777 (W. 189)	The A470 Trunk Road (Swansea Road Roundabout, Merthyr Tydfil to Taffs Well, Rhondda Cynon Taf) (Temporary Traffic Prohibition & Restriction) Order 2021
778	The Customs Safety and Security Procedures (EU Exit) Regulations 2021
779	The Value Added Tax (Miscellaneous Amendments and Repeals) (EU Exit) (Amendment of Coming into Force Date) Regulations 2021
780	The Hydrocarbon Oil and Biofuels (Northern Ireland Private Pleasure Craft) Regulations 2021
781	The Childcare Payments (Miscellaneous Amendment) Regulations 2021
782	The Financial Markets and Insolvency (Transitional Provision) (EU Exit) (Amendment) Regulations 2021
783	The Trade Remedies (Extension of Tariff Rate Quota) (EU Exit) Regulations 2021
784	The Nationality, Immigration and Asylum Act 2002 (Juxtaposed Controls) (Amendment) (No. 2) Order 2021
785	The International Waste Shipments (Amendment of Regulation (EC) No 1013/2006 and 1418/2007) Regulations 2021
786	The Social Security (Scotland) Act 2018 (Disability Assistance for Children and Young People) (Consequential Modifications) Order 2021
787	The Public Procurement (International Trade Agreements) (Amendment) Regulations 2021
788	The National Security and Investment Act 2021 (Commencement No. 1 and Transitional Provision) Regulations 2021
789	The Gas Act 1986 and Electricity Act 1989 (Electronic Communications) Order 2021
790	The Air Navigation (Restriction of Flying) (Music Festivals) Regulations 2021
791	The Town and Country Planning (Fees for Applications, Deemed Applications, Requests and Site Visits) (England) (Amendment) Regulations 2021
792	The Space Industry Regulations 2021
793	The Spaceflight Activities (Investigation of Spaceflight Accidents) Regulations 2021
794	The Air Navigation (Restriction of Flying) (Royal Air Force Coningsby) (No. 2) Regulations 2021
795	The Health Protection (Coronavirus, International Travel and Operator Liability) (England) (Amendment) (No. 5) Regulations 2021
796 (W. 190)	The Cancellation of Student Loans for Living Costs Liability (Wales) Regulations 2021
797 (C. 43)	The Domestic Abuse Act 2021 (Commencement No. 1 and Saving Provisions) Regulations 2021
798	The Air Navigation (Restriction of Flying) (Bournemouth) Regulations 2021
799 (C. 44)	The Finance Act 2021, Section 131 (Temporary Customs and Excise Approvals) (Appointed Day) Regulations 2021
800	The Air Navigation (Restriction of Flying) (Topcliffe) Regulations 2021

== 801–900 ==
Number	Title
801 (W. 191)	The A483 Trunk Road (Welshpool Bypass, Powys) (Temporary Prohibition of Vehicles) Order 2021
802	The Air Navigation (Restriction of Flying) (Cosby) Regulations 2021
803	The Education (Chief Inspector of Education and Training in Wales) Order 2021
804	The Scotland Act 2016 (Social Security) (Consequential Provision) (Miscellaneous Amendment) Regulations 2021
805	The Teachers’ Pensions (Miscellaneous Provisions) (Amendment) Regulations 2021
806	The School Teachers’ Pay and Conditions (England) (Coronavirus) (Amendment) Order 2021
807	The Universal Credit (Coronavirus) (Restoration of the Minimum Income Floor) Regulations 2021
808	Not Allocated
809	The Official Controls (Extension of Transitional Periods) Regulations 2021
810	The Tax Credits and Child Benefit (Miscellaneous and Coronavirus Amendments) Regulations 2021
811	The Social Security (Reciprocal Agreements) (Miscellaneous Amendments) (EU Exit) Regulations 2021
812	The Benchmarks (Provision of Information and Documents) Regulations 2021
813 (W. 192)	The Education (Student Finance) (Miscellaneous Amendments) (Wales) Regulations 2021
814	The Town and Country Planning (General Permitted Development etc.) (England) (Amendment) (No. 2) Order 2021
815	The Contracting Out (Functions in Relation to Space) Order 2021
816	The Space Industry (Appeals) Regulations 2021
817 (C. 45)	The Space Industry Act 2018 (Commencement No. 2, Transitional and Savings Provisions) Regulations 2021
818	The Merchant Shipping (Prevention of Pollution from Noxious Liquid Substances in Bulk and Prevention of Oil Pollution) (Amendment) Regulations 2021
819 (C. 46)	The Offensive Weapons Act 2019 (Commencement No. 1) Regulations 2021
820	The Birmingham Commonwealth Games (Compensation for Enforcement Action) Regulations 2021
821	The Licensing Act 2003 (2020 UEFA European Championship Licensing Hours) Order 2021
822	The Technical Education Certificate (England) Regulations 2021
823	The Somalia (Sanctions) (EU Exit) (Amendment) Regulations 2021
824	The M6 Motorway (Junction 19) (40 Miles Per Hour Speed Limit) Regulations 2021
825	The Church Representation Rules (Amendment) Resolution 2021
826 (W. 193)	The Health Protection (Coronavirus, International Travel and Operator Liability) (Wales) (Miscellaneous Amendments) (No. 2) Regulations 2021
827	The Money Laundering and Terrorist Financing (Amendment) (No. 2) (High-Risk Countries) Regulations 2021
828	The Air Navigation (Restriction of Flying) (Helicopter Flight) (No. 3) Regulations 2021
829	The Air Navigation (Restriction of Flying) (Abingdon Air and Country Show) Regulations 2021
830	The Customs and Excise Border Procedures (Miscellaneous Amendments) (EU Exit) Regulations 2021
831	The Road Vehicles (Display of Registration Marks) (Amendment) Regulations 2021
832 (W. 194)	The Planning (Listed Buildings and Conservation Areas) (Wales) (Amendment) Regulations 2021
833	The School Admissions Code (Appointed Day) (England) Order 2021
834	The Human Medicines (Amendment) (EU Exit) Regulations 2021
835	The Criminal Justice (Electronic Commerce) (Amendment) (EU Exit) Regulations 2021
836	The Air Navigation (Restriction of Flying) (Carnoustie) Regulations 2021
837	The Air Navigation (Restriction of Flying) (Northampton Sywell) Regulations 2021
838 (W. 195)	The Plant Health (Fees) (Forestry) (Wales) (Amendment) (No. 2) Regulations 2021
839	The Occupational Pension Schemes (Climate Change Governance and Reporting) Regulations 2021
840	The Ecclesiastical Offices (Terms of Service) (Amendment) Regulations 2021
841	The Home Loss Payments (Prescribed Amounts) (England) Regulations 2021
842	The Legislative Reform (Church Commissioners) Order 2021
843	The Ecclesiastical Judges, Legal Officers and Others (Fees) Order 2021
844	The Legal Officers (Annual Fees) Order 2021
845	The Education (School Inspection) (England) (Coronavirus) (Amendment) Regulations 2021
846 (W. 196)	The A55 Trunk Road (Eastbound Entry and Exit Slip Roads at Junction 9, Gwynedd) and the A487 Trunk Road (Link Road between Treborth Roundabout and Parc Menai Roundabout, Gwynedd) (Temporary Prohibition of Vehicles, Cyclists and Pedestrians) Order 2021
847 (W. 197)	The Trade in Animals and Related Products (Wales) (Amendment) (EU Exit) (No. 2) Regulations 2021
848	Health Protection (Coronavirus, Restrictions) (Steps etc.) (England) (Revocation and Amendment) Regulations 2021
849 (L. 11)	The Criminal Procedure (Amendment No. 2) Rules 2021
850 (W. 198)	The Coronavirus Act 2020 (Early Expiry: Local Authority Care and Support) (Wales) Regulations 2021
851	The Health Protection (Coronavirus, Restrictions) (Self-Isolation) (England) (Amendment) Regulations 2021
852	The Education (Pupil Registration) (England) (Coronavirus) (Amendment) Regulations 2021
853	The Terrorism Act 2000 (Proscribed Organisations) (Amendment) (No. 2) Order 2021
854	The Bournemouth-Swanage Motor Road and Ferry (Revision of Tolls) (Amendment) Order 2021
855 (L. 12)	The Civil Procedure (Amendment No. 4) Rules 2021
856	The Coronavirus Act 2020 (Early Expiry) Regulations 2021
857	The Occupational Pension Schemes (Climate Change Governance and Reporting) (Miscellaneous Provisions and Amendments) Regulations 2021
858	The Market Surveillance (Northern Ireland) Regulations 2021
859	The Air Navigation (Restriction of Flying) (Helicopter Flight) (No. 4) Regulations 2021
860 (W. 199)	The Care Planning, Placement and Case Review (Wales) (Amendment) Regulations 2021
861 (W. 200)	The Additional Learning Needs and Education Tribunal (Wales) Act 2018 (Consequential Amendments) Regulations 2021
862 (W. 201)	The Health Protection (Coronavirus Restrictions) (No. 5) (Wales) (Amendment) (No. 14) Regulations 2021
863 (W. 202)	The Health Protection (Coronavirus, International Travel and Public Health Information to Travellers) (Wales) (Miscellaneous Amendments) (No. 2) Regulations 2021
864	The Health Protection (Coronavirus, Restrictions) (Self-Isolation) (England) (Amendment) (No. 2) Regulations 2021
865	The Health Protection (Coronavirus, International Travel and Operator Liability) (England) (Amendment) (No. 6) Regulations 2021
866	The Business and Planning Act 2020 (Pavement Licences) (Coronavirus) (Amendment) Regulations 2021
867 (W. 203)	The Health Protection (Coronavirus, International Travel) (Wales) (Amendment) (No. 9) Regulations 2021
868	The Misuse of Drugs Act 1971 (Amendment) Order 2021
869	The Bank of England Act 1998 (Macro-prudential Measures) (Amendment) Order 2021
870	The Customs (Tariff etc.) (Amendment) (No. 2) Regulations 2021
871	The Customs Tariff (Preferential Trade Arrangements) (EU Exit) (Amendment) (No. 2) Regulations 2021
872	The Public Procurement (Agreement on Government Procurement) (Amendment) (No. 2) Regulations 2021
873	The Medical Devices (Amendment) (EU Exit) Regulations 2021
874 (C. 47)	The Space Industry Act 2018 (Commencement No. 2, Transitional and Savings Provisions) (Amendment) Regulations 2021
875 (L. 13)	The Family Procedure (Amendment No. 2) Rules 2021
876	The Justice and Security (Northern Ireland) Act 2007 (Extension of Duration of Non-jury Trial Provisions) Order 2021
877	The Health Security (EU Exit) Regulations 2021
878	The Turks and Caicos Islands Constitution (Amendment) Order 2021
879	The Air Navigation (Amendment) Order 2021
880	The Local Elections (Northern Ireland) (Amendment) Order 2021
881	The European Union and European Atomic Energy Community (Immunities and Privileges) Order 2021
882	The Major Sporting Events (Income Tax Exemption) (2021 UEFA Super Cup) Regulations 2021
883	The Chief Regulator of Qualifications and Examinations (No. 2) Order 2021
884	The European Union (Future Relationship) Act 2020 (References to the Trade and Cooperation Agreement) Regulations 2021
885	The Education (Chief Inspector of Education and Training in Wales) (No. 2) Order 2021
886	The Social Security (Scotland) Act 2018 (Disability Assistance, Young Carer Grants, Short-term Assistance and Winter Heating Assistance) (Consequential Provision and Modifications) Order 2021
887	The Bracknell Forest (Electoral Changes) Order 2021
888	The New Forest (Electoral Changes) Order 2021
889	The Mid Devon (Electoral Changes) Order 2021
890 (C. 48)	The Political Parties, Elections and Referendums Act 2000 (Commencement No. 4 and Transitional Provisions) Order 2021
891	The Health and Social Care Act 2008 (Regulated Activities) (Amendment) (Coronavirus) Regulations 2021
892 (W. 204)	The A40 Trunk Road (Llandeilo to Carmarthen, Carmarthenshire) (Temporary Traffic Prohibitions & Restrictions) Order 2021
893 (W. 205)	The A487 Trunk Road (Meifod to Bontnewydd, Gwynedd) (Temporary Prohibition of Vehicles) Order 2021
894	The Motor Fuel (Composition and Content) and the Biofuel (Labelling) (Amendment) (No. 2) Regulations 2021
895	The St Helena, Ascension and Tristan da Cunha Constitution (Amendment) Order 2021
896	The Union Civil Protection Mechanism (Revocation) (EU Exit) Regulations 2021
897	The Misuse of Drugs and Misuse of Drugs (Designation) (Amendment) (England, Wales and Scotland) Regulations 2021
898	The Road Vehicle Carbon Dioxide Emission Performance Standards (Cars and Vans) (Amendment) (EU Exit) Regulations 2021
899	The Air Navigation (Restriction of Flying) (Goole) (Emergency) Regulations 2021
900	The St Albans (Electoral Changes) Order 2021

== 901–1000 ==
Number	Title
901	The Electricity Capacity (Amendment) Regulations 2021
902	The Diocese of Oxford (Educational Endowments) (Akeley Church of England School) Order 2021
903	The Air Navigation (Restriction of Flying) (Goole) (Emergency) (Revocation) Regulations 2021
904	The REACH etc. (Amendment) Regulations 2021
905	The Medical Devices (Northern Ireland Protocol) Regulations 2021
906 (W. 206)	The Code of Practice on the Delivery of Autism Services (Appointed Day) (Wales) Order 2021
907	The London Luton Airport Passenger Transit System Order 2021
908	The Fisheries Act 2020 (Scheme for Financial Assistance) (England) Regulations 2021
909	The Calorie Labelling (Out of Home Sector) (England) Regulations 2021
910	The Medical Devices (Coronavirus Test Device Approvals) (Amendment) Regulations 2021
911 (W. 207)	The Food and Drink (Transitional Provisions) (Wales) (EU Exit) Regulations 2021
912	The Safety of Sports Grounds (Designation) (Amendment) (England) Order 2021
913	The Sunderland City Council (Riverside Sunderland – New River Wear High Level Footbridge) Scheme 2020 Confirmation Instrument 2021
914	The Health Protection (Coronavirus, International Travel and Operator Liability) (England) (Amendment) (No. 7) Regulations 2021
915 (W. 208)	The Health Protection (Coronavirus, International Travel and Operator Liability) (Wales) (Miscellaneous Amendments) (No. 3) Regulations 2021
916 (W. 209)	The National Health Service (Optical Charges and Payments) (Amendment) (Wales) Regulations 2021
917	The Greenhouse Gas Emissions Trading Scheme Auctioning (Amendment) (No. 2) Regulations 2021
918	The Power to Award Degrees etc. (TEDI-London) Order 2021
919	The Doncaster East Internal Drainage Board Order 2021
920	The Benchmarks (Provision of Information and Documents) (Amendment) Regulations 2021
921	The Drivers’ Hours and Tachographs (Temporary Exceptions) (No. 2) Regulations 2021
922	The Republic of Belarus (Sanctions) (EU Exit) (Amendment) Regulations 2021 (revoked)
923	The Health Protection (Coronavirus, International Travel and Operator Liability) (England) (Amendment) (No. 8) Regulations 2021
924	The Ecodesign for Energy-Related Products and Energy Information (Amendment) (Northern Ireland) (EU Exit) Regulations 2021
925 (W. 210)	The Health Protection (Coronavirus Restrictions) (No. 5) (Wales) (Amendment) (No. 15) Regulations 2021
926 (W. 211)	The Health Protection (Coronavirus, International Travel and Operator Liability) (Wales) (Miscellaneous Amendments) (No. 4) Regulations 2021
927	The Air Navigation (Restriction of Flying) (Manchester) Regulations 2021
928	The Air Navigation (Restriction of Flying) (Birmingham) Regulations 2021
929	The Education (Student Fees, Awards and Support) (Amendment) (No. 2) Regulations 2021
930 (W. 212)	The A55 Trunk Road (Entry and Exit Slip Roads at Junction 4, (Dalar Hir Interchange), Anglesey) (Temporary Prohibition of Vehicles) Order 2021
931	The Education (National Curriculum) (Key Stage 1 Assessment Arrangements) (England) (Coronavirus) (Amendment) Order 2021
932	The Education (School Performance Information) (England) (Coronavirus) (Amendment) Regulations 2021
933 (W. 213)	The Additional Learning Needs and Education Tribunal (Wales) Act 2018 (Consequential Amendments) (No. 2) Regulations 2021
934	The Cleve Hill Solar Park (Correction) Order 2021
935	The Air Navigation (Restriction of Flying) (Old Warden) (Amendment) (No. 2) Regulations 2021
936	The Air Navigation (Restriction of Flying) (Jet Formation Display Teams) (Amendment) (No. 2) Regulations 2021
937	The Network Rail (Teddington Station Access for All) Order 2021
938 (C. 49) (W. 214)	The Additional Learning Needs and Education Tribunal (Wales) Act 2018 (Amendment of Commencement Order No. 2 and Revocation of Commencement Order No. 3 and Commencement Order No. 4) Order 2021
939 (C. 50)	The Immigration Act 2016 (Commencement and Transitional Provisions No. 1) (England and Wales) Regulations 2021
940	The Power to Award Degrees etc. (Ashridge (Bonar Law Memorial) Trust) Order of Council 2014 (Amendment) Order 2021
941	The Television Multiplex Services (Renewal of Multiplex Licences) Order 2021
942	The Trade Remedies (Dumping and Subsidisation) (Amendment) (EU Exit) Regulations 2021
943	The Air Navigation (Restriction of Flying) (Old Warden) (Amendment) (No. 3) Regulations 2021
944	The Public Interest Merger Reference (Cobham Ultra Acquisitions Ltd. and Ultra Electronics Holdings plc) (Pre-emptive Action) Order 2021
945	The Policing and Crime Act 2017 (Commencement No. 11 and Transitional Provisions) (Amendment) Regulations 2021
946	The Secure Tenancies (Notices) (Amendment) and Suspension (Coronavirus) (England) Regulations 2021
947	The M48 Motorway (Severn Bridge Half Marathon) (Temporary Prohibition of Traffic) Order 2021
948	The Wireless Telegraphy (Exemption) (Amendment) Regulations 2021
949 (W. 215)	The A470 Trunk Road (Mallwyd Roundabout, Gwynedd to Black Cat Roundabout, Conwy) (Temporary Traffic Prohibitions and Restrictions) Order 2021
950 (C. 51)	The Pension Schemes Act 2021 (Commencement No. 3 and Transitional and Saving Provisions) Regulations 2021
951 (W. 216)	The A5 Trunk Road (Junction 11, (Llys y Gwynt Interchange), Bangor, Gwynedd to (Gledrid Roundabout), Chirk, Wrexham to the Wales/England Border) (Temporary Traffic Prohibitions and Restrictions) Order 2021
952 (W. 217)	The Business Tenancies (Extension of Protection from Forfeiture etc.) (Wales) (Coronavirus) (No. 3) Regulations 2021
953	The School Discipline (Pupil Exclusions and Reviews) (England) (Coronavirus) (Amendment) (No. 2) Regulations 2021
954 (W. 218)	The A465 Trunk Road (Resolven Roundabout to Glynneath Roundabout, Neath Port Talbot) (Temporary Traffic Prohibitions and Restrictions) Order 2021
955 (W. 219)	The Infant Formula and Follow-on Formula (Wales) (Amendment) Regulations 2021
956 (W. 220)	The A487 Trunk Road (Machynlleth, Powys to the North of Dyfi Bridge, Gwynedd) (Temporary Speed Restrictions and Prohibition of Overtaking) Order 2021
957 (W. 221)	The A48 Trunk Road (Mount Pleasant, Chepstow, Monmouthshire) (Temporary Prohibition of Pedestrians) Order 2021
958 (W. 222)	The A40 Trunk Road (Pont Lesneven Roundabout to Travellers Rest, Carmarthen, Carmarthenshire) (Temporary Speed Restrictions) Order 2021
959 (W. 223)	The A483 Trunk Road (Llandovery to Sugar Loaf, Carmarthenshire) (Temporary Traffic Prohibitions & Restrictions) Order 2021
960	The Air Navigation (Restriction of Flying) (Helicopter Flight) (No. 5) Regulations 2021
961	The Air Navigation (Restriction of Flying) (TRNSMT Festival, Glasgow) Regulations 2021
962	The Town and Country Planning (Napier Barracks) Special Development Order 2021
963 (W. 224)	The A483 Trunk Road (Newbridge Bypass, Wrexham County Borough) (Temporary Traffic Prohibitions & Restrictions) Order 2021
964 (W. 225)	The A5 Trunk Road (Chirk Bypass, Wrexham County Borough) (Temporary Traffic Prohibitions & Restrictions) Order 2021
965 (W. 226)	The A5 Trunk Road (Halton Roundabout to Whitehurst Roundabout, Chirk, Wrexham County Borough) (Temporary Traffic Prohibitions & Restrictions) Order 2021
966	The Health Protection (Coronavirus, International Travel and Operator Liability) (England) (Amendment) (No. 9) Regulations 2021
967 (W. 227)	The Health Protection (Coronavirus, International Travel) (Wales) (Amendment) (No. 10) Regulations 2021
968	The Designation of Schools Having a Religious Character (Independent Schools) (England) Order 2021
969	The Designation of Schools Having a Religious Character (England) Order 2021
970 (W. 228)	The Health Protection (Coronavirus Restrictions) (No. 5) (Wales) (Amendment) (No. 16) Regulations 2021
971 (W. 229)	The A5 Trunk Road (Holyhead Road Roundabout, Bangor, Gwynedd to Mona Road Roundabout, Menai Bridge, Anglesey) (Temporary Prohibition of Vehicles, Cyclists & Pedestrians) Order 2021
972	The Meat Preparations (Amendment and Transitory Modification) (England) (EU Exit) (Amendment) (No. 2) Regulations 2021
973	The Heavy Commercial Vehicles in Kent (No. 3) (Amendment) (No. 2) Order 2021
974	The Public Health England (Dissolution) (Consequential Amendments) Regulations 2021
975	The Transfer of Undertakings (Protection of Employment) (Transfer of Public Health England Staff) Regulations 2021
976 (W. 230)	The A494 Trunk Road (Ewloe Green, Flintshire to Dolgellau, Gwynedd) (Temporary Traffic Restrictions & Prohibitions) Order 2021
977 (W. 231)	The Meat Preparations (Amendment and Transitory Modification) (Wales) (EU Exit) (Amendment) (No. 2) Regulations 2021
978	The Infrastructure Planning (Prescribed Consultees and Interested Parties etc.) (Amendment) Regulations 2021
979	The Indirect Taxes (Disclosure of Avoidance Schemes) (Amendment) Regulations 2021
980	The Tax Avoidance Schemes (Information) (Amendment) Regulations 2021
981	The Air Navigation (Restriction of Flying) (Northampton Sywell) (Amendment) Regulations 2021
982	The Leeds City Council (Sovereign Street Bridge) Scheme 2021 Confirmation Instrument 2021
983 (C. 52)	The Customs (Northern Ireland) (EU Exit) Regulations 2020 (Appointed Day) Regulations 2021
984	The Financial Assistance for Environmental Purposes Order 2021
985 (L. 14)	The Court Fees (Miscellaneous Amendments) Order 2021
986	The Value Added Tax (Amendment) Regulations 2021
987	The Crime (International Co-operation) Act 2003 (Freezing Order) (England and Wales and Northern Ireland) Regulations 2021
988	The Heavy Commercial Vehicles in Kent (No. 2) (Amendment) Order 2021
989	Not Allocated
990	The Domestic Abuse Support (Local Authority Strategies and Annual Reports) Regulations 2021
991	The Domestic Abuse Support (Relevant Accommodation and Housing Benefit and Universal Credit Sanctuary Schemes) (Amendment) Regulations 2021
992	The School Admissions (England) (Coronavirus) (Appeals Arrangements) (Amendment) (No. 2) Regulations 2021
993	The Public Interest Merger Reference (Perpetuus Advanced Materials plc) (Pre-emptive Action) Order 2021
994	The Coronavirus Act 2020 (Residential Tenancies and Notices) (Amendment and Suspension) (England) Regulations 2021
995	The National Health Service (General Medical Services Contracts and Personal Medical Services Agreements) (Amendment) (No. 2) Regulations 2021
996 (W. 232)	The Education (Admission Appeals Arrangements) (Wales) (Coronavirus) (Amendment) (Amendment) Regulations 2021
997 (W. 233)	The A494 Trunk Road (Llanycil, Gwynedd) (Temporary Prohibition of Vehicles, Cyclists and Pedestrians) Order 2021
998 (W. 234)	The A458 Trunk Road (Mallwyd to Nant yr Ehedydd, Gwynedd) (Temporary Traffic Prohibitions & Restrictions) Order 2021
999	The Compulsory Electronic Monitoring Licence Condition (Amendment) Order 2021
1000 (W. 235)	The A55 Trunk Road (Penmaenbach Tunnel, Conwy County Borough) (Temporary Traffic Prohibitions & Restrictions) Order 2021

== 1001–1100 ==
Number	Title
1001	The Tuberculosis in Animals (England) Order 2021
1002 (W. 236)	The A487 Trunk Road (Heol y Doll, Machynlleth, Powys) (Temporary Prohibition of Vehicles, Cyclists & Pedestrians) Order 2021
1003	The Health Protection (Coronavirus, International Travel and Operator Liability) (England) (Amendment) (No. 10) Regulations 2021
1004 (C. 53)	The Botulinum Toxin and Cosmetic Fillers (Children) Act 2021 (Commencement) Regulations 2021
1005	The Education (Student Loans) (Repayment) (Amendment) (No. 3) Regulations 2021
1006 (C. 54)	The Anti-social Behaviour, Crime and Policing Act 2014 (Commencement No. 12) Order 2021
1007	The Immigration (Disposal of Property) (Amendment) Regulations 2021
1008 (W. 237)	The A5 Trunk Road (Berwyn Street and Regent Street, Llangollen, Denbighshire) (Temporary Prohibition of Vehicles, Cyclists and Pedestrians) Order 2021
1009	The National Lottery (Revocation and Amendment) Regulations 2021
1010	The Promoters of Tax Avoidance Schemes (Prescribed Circumstances under Section 235) (Amendment) Regulations 2021
1011	The Customs (Safety and Security Procedures) Regulations 2021
1012 (W. 238	The School Teachers’ Pay and Conditions (Wales) Order 2021
1013	The Statutory Sick Pay (Coronavirus) (Funding of Employers’ Liabilities) (Closure) Regulations and the Statutory Sick Pay (Coronavirus) (Funding of Employers’ Liabilities) (Northern Ireland) (Closure) Regulations 2021
1014 (W. 239	The A5 Trunk Road (Pentrefoelas, Conwy) and the A470 Trunk Road (Llanrwst, Conwy) (Temporary Prohibition of Vehicles, Cyclists and Pedestrians) Order 2021
1015 (C. 55) (W. 240)	The Commons Act 2006 (Commencement No. 6) (Wales) Order 2021
1016 (W. 241)	The A494 Trunk Road (Bala, Gwynedd) (Temporary Traffic Prohibition and Speed Limit) Order 2021
1017 (W. 242)	The A487 Trunk Road (Dyfi Bridge to Parc Menai, Gwynedd) (Temporary Traffic Prohibitions and Restrictions) Order 2021
1018 (C. 56)	The Crime and Courts Act 2013 (Commencement No. 19) Order 2021
1019	The Childcare (Childminder Agencies) (Registration, Inspection and Supply and Disclosure of Information) and Her Majesty's Chief Inspector of Education, Children's Services and Skills (Fees and Frequency of Inspections) (Children's Homes etc.) (Coronavirus) (Amendment) Regulations 2021
1020	The Gender Recognition (Disclosure of Information) (England and Wales) Order 2021
1021	The Serious Organised Crime and Police Act 2005 (Designated Scottish Sites under Section 129) Order 2021
1022	The Serious Organised Crime and Police Act 2005 (Designated Sites under Section 128) (Amendment) Order 2021
1023	The Value Added Tax (Treatment of Transactions) (Revocation) Order 2021
1024	The Air Navigation (Restriction of Flying) (G7 Speakers Event) Regulations 2021
1025	The Insolvency (Scotland) (Receivership and Winding up) (Amendment) Rules 2021
1026	The Insolvency (Scotland) (Company Voluntary Arrangements and Administration) (Amendment) Rules 2021
1027	Not Allocated
1028	The Insolvency (England and Wales) (No.2) (Amendment) Rules 2021
1029	The Corporate Insolvency and Governance Act 2020 (Coronavirus) (Amendment of Schedule 10) Regulations 2021 (revoked)
1030	The Tonnage Tax (Training Requirement) (Amendment etc.) Regulations 2021
1031	The Income-related Benefits (Subsidy to Authorities) and Discretionary Housing Payments (Grants) Amendment Order 2021
1032	The Air Navigation (Restriction of Flying) (Chequers) Regulations 2021
1033	The Health Protection (Coronavirus, International Travel and Operator Liability) (England) (Amendment) (No. 11) Regulations 2021
1034	The Social Security (Habitual Residence and Past Presence) (Amendment) Regulations 2021
1035	The Immigration and Nationality (Replacement of T2 Sportsperson Route and Fees) (Amendment) Regulations 2021
1036 (C. 57)	The Youth Justice and Criminal Evidence Act 1999 (Commencement No. 22) Order 2021
1037	The Employment Tribunals (Constitution and Rules of Procedure) (Early Conciliation: Exemptions and Rules of Procedure) (Amendment) Regulations 2021
1038 (C. 58)	The Domestic Abuse Act 2021 (Commencement No. 2) Regulations 2021
1039	The Child Benefit (General) (Amendment) Regulations 2021
1040 (W. 243)	The A470 & A458 Trunk Roads (Moat Lane Level Crossing, Caersws and Buttington Level Crossing, Buttington, Powys) (Temporary Prohibition of Vehicles) Order 2021
1041	The Democratic Republic of the Congo (Sanctions) (EU Exit) (Amendment) Regulations 2021
1042 (W. 244)	The Coronavirus Act 2020 (Suspension: Transportation, Storage and Disposal of Dead Bodies etc) (Wales) Regulations 2021
1043	The Trailer Registration (Amendment) Regulations 2021
1044 (W. 245)	The A479 Trunk Road (Glanusk Park to Tretower, Powys) (Temporary 50 mph Speed Limit) Order 2021
1045	The Allocation of Housing and Homelessness (Eligibility) (England) and Persons subject to Immigration Control (Housing Authority Accommodation and Homelessness) (Amendment) Regulations 2021
1046	The Financial Services and Markets Act 2000 (Prudential Regulation of FCA Investment Firms) (Definitions for the purposes of Part 9C) Regulations 2021
1047	The Pensions Regulator (Employer Resources Test) Regulations 2021
1048	The Co-operative and Community Benefit Societies (Administration) (Amendment) Order 2021
1049	The Alcohol Licensing (Coronavirus) (Regulatory Easements) (Amendment) Regulations 2021
1050	The Air Navigation (Restriction of Flying) (Chelsea Flower Show) Regulations 2021
1051	The Central Bedfordshire (Electoral Changes) Order 2021
1052	The North Kesteven (Electoral Changes) Order 2021
1053	The London Borough of Havering (Electoral Changes) Order 2021
1054	The Medway (Electoral Changes) Order 2021
1055	The North Killingholme (Generating Station) (Amendment) Order 2021
1056	The United Kingdom Internal Market Act 2020 (Maximum Penalty) Regulations 2021
1057	The Direct Payments to Farmers (Inspections) (England) Regulations 2021
1058 (W. 246)	The A40 Trunk Road (Monk Street, Abergavenny, Monmouthshire) (Temporary Prohibition of Pedestrians) Order 2021
1059 (C. 59) (W. 247)	The Historic Environment (Wales) Act 2016 (Commencement No. 2) Order 2021
1060 (W. 248)	The M4 Motorway (Junction 34 (Miskin), Rhondda Cynon Taf to Junction 49 (Pont Abraham), Carmarthenshire) (Temporary Prohibition of Vehicles) Order 2021
1061 (W. 249)	The M4 Motorway (Junction 32 (Coryton) to Junction 33 (Capel Llanilltern), Cardiff) (Temporary Traffic Prohibitions & Restrictions) Order 2021
1062 (C. 60)	The United Kingdom Internal Market Act 2020 (Commencement No. 3) Regulations 2021
1063 (W. 250)	The Health Protection (Coronavirus, International Travel and Notification) (Wales) (Miscellaneous Amendments) Regulations 2021
1064 (W. 251)	The Coronavirus Act 2020 (Residential Tenancies: Extension of Period of Protection from Eviction) (No. 3) (Wales) Regulations 2021
1065	The Social Security Benefits (Claims and Payments) (Amendment) Regulations 2021
1066	The Health Protection (Coronavirus, International Travel and Operator Liability) (England) (Amendment) (No. 12) Regulations 2021
1067	The M6 Toll Motorway (M6 Junction 11a to M6 Toll Junction T8, Staffordshire) (Temporary Prohibition of Traffic) Order 2021
1068	The Air Navigation (Restriction of Flying) (COP26) Regulations 2021
1069 (W. 252) (C. 61)	The Curriculum and Assessment (Wales) Act 2021 (Commencement No. 1) Order 2021
1070	The Occupational Pension Schemes (Administration, Investment, Charges and Governance) (Amendment) Regulations 2021
1071 (W. 253)	The A48 Trunk Road (Cross Hands Roundabout to South-East of Pensarn Roundabout) and the A40 Trunk Road (Pensarn Roundabout to St Clears Roundabout, Carmarthenshire) (Temporary Traffic Restrictions and Prohibition) Order 2021
1072	The Air Navigation (Restriction of Flying) (Tottenham Hotspur Football Stadium) Regulations 2021
1073	The Health Protection (Coronavirus, Restrictions) (Self-Isolation) (England) (Amendment) (No. 3) Regulations 2021
1074	The Markets in Financial Instruments, Benchmarks and Financial Promotions (Amendment) (EU Exit) Regulations 2021
1075 (W. 254)	The City and County of Swansea (Electoral Arrangements) Order 2021
1076	The Income Tax (Digital Requirements) Regulations 2021
1077	The Fines (Deductions from Income Support) (Miscellaneous Amendments) Regulations 2021
1078	The Capital Requirements Regulation (Amendment) Regulations 2021
1079 (C. 62)	The Finance (No. 2) Act 2017, Sections 60 and 61 and Schedule 14 (Digital Reporting and Record-Keeping) (Appointed Day) Regulations 2021
1080 (W. 255)	The County Borough of Rhondda Cynon Taf (Electoral Arrangements) Order 2021
1081 (W. 256)	The County of Powys (Electoral Arrangements) Order 2021
1082 (W. 257)	The County of Carmarthenshire (Electoral Arrangements) Order 2021
1083	The Diocese of Leicester (Educational Endowments) (Mowsley St Nicholas Church of England Primary School) Order 2021
1084 (W. 258)	The County Borough of Bridgend (Electoral Arrangements) Order 2021
1085	The Pennine Acute Hospitals National Health Service Trust (Dissolution) Order 2021
1086	The East Anglia ONE Offshore Wind Farm (Amendment) Order 2021
1087	The Introduction and the Import of Cultural Goods (Revocation) Regulations 2021
1088	The Social Security (Switzerland) Order 2021
1089	The City of Liverpool (Scheme of Elections and Elections of Elected Mayor) Order 2021
1090	The Conference of the Parties to the United Nations Framework Convention on Climate Change (Immunities and Privileges) Order 2021
1091	The Corporate Insolvency and Governance Act 2020 (Coronavirus) (Amendment of Schedule 10) (No. 2) Regulations 2021
1092 (W. 259) (C. 63)	The Fire Safety Act 2021 (Commencement) (Wales) Regulations 2021
1093	The Education (School Teachers’ Qualifications) (England) (Amendment) Regulations 2021
1094 (W. 260)	The Trade in Animals and Related Products (Wales) (Amendment) (EU Exit) (No. 3) Regulations 2021
1095	The Ecodesign for Energy-Related Products and Energy Information (Lighting Products) Regulations 2021
1096	The Official Controls (Extension of Transitional Periods) (England and Wales) (Amendment) Regulations 2021
1097	The Ecodesign for Energy-Related Products and Energy Information (Amendment) Regulations 2021
1098 (W. 261)	The A470 Trunk Road (Llanrwst, Conwy) (Temporary Prohibition of Vehicles, Cyclists and Pedestrians) Order 2021
1099 (W. 262)	The A483 Trunk Road (Junction 1 (Ruabon Interchange) to the Wales/England Border, Wrexham County Borough) (Temporary Traffic Prohibitions and Restrictions) Order 2021
1100 (W. 263)	The A55 Trunk Road (Junction 11 (Llys y Gwynt Interchange), Bangor, Gwynedd to Junction 16 (Puffin Roundabout, Penmaenmawr, Conwy)) (Temporary Traffic Prohibitions and Restrictions) Order 2021

== 1101–1494 ==
Number	Title
1101	The School Teachers’ Pay and Conditions (England) Order 2021
1102 (W. 264)	The A483 Trunk Road (Junction 5 (Mold Road Interchange) to Junction 7 (Rossett Interchange), Wrexham County Borough) (Temporary Traffic Prohibitions and Restrictions) Order 2021
1103	Not Allocated
1104	The Inspectors of Education, Children's Services and Skills (No. 3) Order 2021
1105	The Railway (Licensing of Railway Undertakings) (Amendment) Regulations 2021
1106	The Drivers’ Hours and Tachographs (Temporary Exceptions) (No. 3) Regulations 2021
1107	The Health Protection (Coronavirus, International Travel and Operator Liability) (England) (Amendment) (No. 13) Regulations 2021
1108	The Merchant Shipping (Prevention of Air Pollution from Ships) (Amendment) Regulations 2021
1109 (W. 265)	The Health Protection (Coronavirus, International Travel, Operator Liability and Public Health Information to Travellers) (Wales) (Miscellaneous Amendments) (No. 3) Regulations 2021
1110	The Radiation Emergency and Consultation Regulations 2021
1111 (W. 266)	The County Borough of Merthyr Tydfil (Electoral Arrangements) Order 2021
1112 (W. 267)	The County of the Isle of Anglesey (Electoral Arrangements) Order 2021
1113 (W. 268)	The County Borough of Wrexham (Electoral Arrangements) Order 2021
1114 (W. 269)	The County Borough of Neath Port Talbot (Electoral Arrangements) Order 2021
1115	The Renewable Energy, Energy Efficiency and Motor Fuel Emissions (Miscellaneous Amendments) (EU Exit) Regulations 2021
1116 (W. 270)	The A465 Trunk Road (Westbound Off-Slip Road, Llanfoist Interchange, Monmouthshire) (Temporary Prohibition of Vehicles) Order 2021
1117	The Wireless Telegraphy (Licence Charges) (Amendment) Regulations 2021
1118	The Air Navigation (Restriction of Flying) (South Kensington) Regulations 2021
1119 (W. 271)	The Health Protection (Coronavirus Restrictions) (No. 5) (Wales) (Amendment) (No. 17) Regulations 2021
1120	The Air Navigation (Restriction of Flying) (Windsor Castle) Regulations 2021
1121 (W. 272)	The Education Tribunal for Wales (Amendment) Regulations 2021
1122	The Local Government (Assistants for Political Groups) (Remuneration) (England) Order 2021
1123	The National Health Service (Charges to Overseas Visitors) (Amendment) Regulations 2021
1124	The Non-Maintained Special Schools (England) and Independent School Standards (Amendment) Regulations 2021
1125	The Civil Enforcement of Parking Contraventions Designation Order 2021
1126 (W. 273)	The Health Protection (Coronavirus, International Travel) (Wales) (Amendment) (No. 11) Regulations 2021
1127	The Financial Services and Markets Act 2000 (Exemption) (Amendment) Order 2021
1128	The Motor Vehicles (Driving Licences) (Amendment) Regulations 2021
1129	The Social Security (Information-sharing in relation to Welfare Services etc.) (Amendment) Regulations 2021
1130	The Health Protection (Coronavirus, International Travel and Operator Liability) (England) (Amendment) (No. 14) Regulations 2021
1131 (W. 274)	The Health Protection (Coronavirus Restrictions) (No. 5) (Wales) (Amendment) (No. 18) Regulations 2021
1132	The Jobseeker's Allowance and Employment and Support Allowance (Amendment) Regulations 2021
1133	The Air Navigation (Restriction of Flying) (Bristol) Regulations 2021
1134	The Air Navigation (Restriction of Flying) (Scottish Event Campus, Glasgow) Regulations 2021
1135	The Air Navigation (Restriction of Flying) (Remembrance Sunday) Regulations 2021
1136	The Air Navigation (Restriction of Flying) (Taynuilt) (Emergency) Regulations 2021
1137	The Air Navigation (Restriction of Flying) (Windsor Castle) (Restricted Area EG R156) Regulations 2021
1138 (W. 275)	The County Borough of the Vale of Glamorgan (Electoral Arrangements) Order 2021
1139 (W. 276)	The County Borough of Torfaen (Electoral Arrangements) Order 2021
1140 (W. 277)	The County of Ceredigion (Electoral Arrangements) Order 2021
1141 (W. 278)	The Non-Domestic Rating (Miscellaneous Provisions) (No. 2) (Amendment) (Wales) Regulations 2021
1142 (W. 279)	The A487 Trunk Road (South of Cardigan, Ceredigion to the Pembrokeshire/Ceredigion County Boundary at Gamallt Bends, Pembrokeshire) (Temporary Prohibition of Vehicles) Order 2021
1143 (W. 280)	The A483 Trunk Road (Pont Abraham to Llandeilo, Carmarthenshire) (Temporary Speed Restrictions & No Overtaking) Order 2021
1144 (W. 281)	The A4076 & A40 Trunk Roads (Haverfordwest to Milford Haven, Pembrokeshire) (Temporary Speed Restrictions & No Overtaking) Order 2021
1145	The Air Navigation (Restriction of Flying) (Taynuilt) (Emergency) (Revocation) Regulations 2021
1146	The Republic of Belarus (Sanctions) (EU Exit) (Amendment) (No. 2) Regulations 2021
1147 (W. 282)	The Allocation of Housing and Homelessness (Eligibility) (Wales) (Amendment) (No. 2) Regulations 2021
1148	The Competition Act 1998 (Football Broadcasting Rights) (Public Policy Exclusion) Order 2021
1149	The Packaged Retail and Insurance-based Investment Products (UCITS Exemption) (Amendment) Regulations 2021
1150	The Occupational and Personal Pension Schemes (Disclosure of Information) (Statements of Benefits: Money Purchase Benefits) (Amendment) Regulations 2021
1151	The Cathedrals Measure 2021 (Transitional Provisions) Order 2021
1152	The Social Security (Amendment) Regulations 2021
1153	The Air Navigation (Restriction of Flying) (Portsmouth Harbour) Regulations 2021
1154	The Motor Vehicles (Driving Licences) (Amendment) (No. 3) Regulations 2021
1155	The Health Protection (Coronavirus, International Travel and Operator Liability) (England) (Amendment) (No. 15) Regulations 2021
1156	The Free Zones (Customs, Excise and Value Added Tax) Regulations 2021
1157 (W. 283)	The A4042 Trunk Road (Court Farm Roundabout, Torfaen to Hardwick Roundabout, Monmouthshire) (Temporary Speed Restrictions and No Overtaking) Order 2021
1158	The Employment and Support Allowance and Universal Credit (Coronavirus Disease) (Amendment) Regulations 2021
1159 (W. 284)	The County of Denbighshire (Electoral Arrangements) Order 2021
1160 (W. 285)	The City and County of Cardiff (Electoral Arrangements) Order 2021
1161 (W. 286)	The County Borough of Blaenau Gwent (Electoral Arrangements) Order 2021
1162 (W. 287)	The A465, A470 & A4060 Trunk Roads (Various Locations between Rhymney Interchange, Caerphilly County Borough and Glynneath Interchange, Neath Port Talbot) (Temporary Traffic Prohibitions & Restrictions) (No. 2) Order 2021
1163 (C. 64)	The Financial Services Act 2021 (Commencement No. 1) (Amendment) (Savings Provision) Regulations 2021
1164	The Value Added Tax (Distance Selling and Miscellaneous Amendments) Regulations 2021
1165	The Value Added Tax (Distance Selling and Miscellaneous Amendments No. 2) Regulations 2021
1166 (W. 288)	The General Power of Competence (Commercial Purpose) (Conditions) (Wales) Regulations 2021
1167	The Inheritance Tax (Delivery of Accounts) (Excepted Estates) (Amendment) Regulations 2021
1168	The Childcare (Early Years Provision Free of Charge) (Extended Entitlement) (Amendment) (No. 2) Regulations 2021
1169	The Competition Act 1998 (Carbon Dioxide) (Public Policy Exclusion) Order 2021
1170 (C. 65)	The Digital Economy Act 2017 (Commencement No. 8) Regulations 2021
1171	The Phytosanitary Conditions (Amendment) (No. 2) Regulations 2021
1172	The Firearms (Amendment) (No. 2) Rules 2021
1173 (C. 66)	The Financial Services Act 2021 (Commencement No. 3) Regulations 2021
1174	The A5 Trunk Road (Mile End Roundabout Upgrade (Oswestry)) (Trunking) Order 2021
1175	The A5 and B4579 Trunk Roads (Mile End Roundabout Upgrade (Oswestry)) (Detrunking) Order 2021
1176 (W. 289)	The Scheduled Monuments (Heritage Partnership Agreements) (Wales) Regulations 2021
1177 (W. 290)	The Listed Buildings (Heritage Partnership Agreements) (Wales) Regulations 2021
1178	The Payment and Electronic Money Institution Insolvency (England and Wales) Rules 2021
1179	The Health Protection (Coronavirus, International Travel and Operator Liability) (England) (Amendment) (No. 16) Regulations 2021
1180 (W. 291	The Agricultural Holdings (Units of Production) (Wales) (No. 2) Order 2021
1181 (W. 292	The County Borough of Conwy (Electoral Arrangements) Order 2021
1182 (W. 293	The County of Pembrokeshire (Electoral Arrangements) Order 2021
1183 (L. 16)	The Tribunal Procedure (Amendment No. 2) Rules 2021
1184 (W. 294)	The A465 Trunk Road (Neath to Llandarcy, Neath Port Talbot) (Temporary Traffic Prohibitions & Restrictions) Order 2021
1185 (W. 295)	The A494 Trunk Road (Llanuwchllyn, Gwynedd) (Part-time 20 mph Speed Limit) Order 2021
1186 (W. 296)	The M4 Motorway (Junction 37 (Pyle), Bridgend to Junction 38 (Margam), Neath Port Talbot) (Temporary Traffic Prohibitions & Restrictions) Order 2021
1187	The Goods Vehicles (Licensing of Operators) (Temporary Use in Great Britain) (Amendment) Regulations 2021
1188	The Social Security (Scotland) Act 2018 (Information-Sharing and Disability Assistance) (Consequential Provision and Modifications) Order 2021
1189 (W. 297)	The Development Procedure (Consultees) (Wales) (Miscellaneous Amendments) Order 2021
1190	The Channel Tunnel (Arrangements with the Kingdom of the Netherlands) (Amendment) Order 2021
1191	The Customs Tariff (Establishment and Suspension of Import Duty) (EU Exit) (Amendment) (No. 2) Regulations 2021
1192	The Customs Tariff (Preferential Trade Arrangements and Tariff Quotas) (EU Exit) (Amendment) (No. 4) Regulations 2021
1193	The Designation of Freeport Tax Sites (Humber Freeport) Regulations 2021
1194	The Designation of Freeport Tax Sites (Teesside Freeport) Regulations 2021
1195	The Designation of Freeport Tax Sites (Thames Freeport) Regulations 2021
1196	The Channel Tunnel (International Arrangements and Miscellaneous Provisions) (Amendment) Order 2021
1197 (W. 298)	The A40 Trunk Road (Brecon Road, Monmouthshire to the County Boundary at Glangrwyney, Powys) (Temporary Traffic Prohibitions and Restrictions) Order 2021
1198	The Birmingham Commonwealth Games (Advertising and Trading) Regulations 2021
1199	The Coronavirus Act 2020 (Suspension: Disposal of Bodies) (England) Regulations 2021
1200	The Airports Slot Allocation (Alleviation of Usage Requirements) (No. 2) Regulations 2021
1201 (W. 299)	The A465 Trunk Road (Brynmawr, Blaenau Gwent to Glanbaiden, Monmouthshire) (Clearway) Order 2021
1202 (W. 300)	The A465 Trunk Road (Brynmawr, Blaenau Gwent to Glanbaiden, Monmouthshire) (50 mph Speed Limit) Order 2021
1203	The Aviation Safety (Amendment) (No. 3) Regulations 2021
1204 (W. 301)	The Valuation for Rating (Wales) (Coronavirus) Regulations 2021
1205	The Customs (Import and Export Declarations By Conduct) (Amendment) Regulations 2021
1206	The Heavy Commercial Vehicles in Kent (No. 1) (Amendment) Order 2021
1207	The Drivers’ Hours and Tachographs (Temporary Exceptions) (No. 4) Regulations 2021
1208	The Water and Sewerage Undertakers (Exit from Non-household Retail Market) (Consequential Provision) Regulations 2021
1209	Not Allocated
1210	The Health Protection (Coronavirus, International Travel and Operator Liability) (England) (Amendment) (No. 17) Regulations 2021
1211	The River Tyne (Tunnels) (Revision of Tolls) (Amendment) Order 2021
1212 (W. 303)	The Health Protection (Coronavirus, Restrictions, International Travel, Notification and Public Health Information to Travellers) (Wales) (Miscellaneous Amendments) Regulations 2021
1213	The Health Protection (Coronavirus, International Travel and Operator Liability) (England) (Amendment) (No. 17) (Amendment) Regulations 2021
1214	The Power to Award Degrees etc. (ICMP Management Limited) Order 2021
1215 (W. 304)	The County of Flintshire (Electoral Arrangements) Order 2021
1216 (W. 305)	The City and County Borough of Newport (Electoral Arrangements) Order 2021
1217 (W. 306)	The County Borough of Caerphilly (Electoral Arrangements) Order 2021
1218	The Money Laundering and Terrorist Financing (Amendment) (No. 3) (High-Risk Countries) Regulations 2021
1219	The Norfolk (Electoral Changes) Order 2021
1220	The East Staffordshire (Electoral Changes) Order 2021
1221	The Public Procurement (Agreement on Government Procurement) (Thresholds) (Amendment) Regulations 2021
1222	The Housing (Right to Buy) (Designated Rural Areas and Designated Regions) (England) Order 2021
1223 (W. 307)	The County of Gwynedd (Electoral Arrangements) Order 2021
1224	The Universal Credit (Exceptions to the Requirement not to be receiving Education) (Amendment) Regulations 2021
1225 (W. 308)	The Diocese of Bangor (Educational Endowments) (Ysgol Llanddeusant) Order 2021
1226	The Land Registration Fee Order 2021
1227 (W. 309)	The Monmouthshire (Communities) Order 2021
1228 (W. 310)	The County of Flintshire (Electoral Arrangements) (No. 2) Order 2021
1229	The Animal Health, Plant Health, Seeds and Seed Potatoes (Miscellaneous Amendments) Regulations 2021
1230	The Rochdale (Electoral Changes) Order 2021
1231	The Births and Deaths Registration (Electronic Communications and Electronic Storage) Order 2021
1232 (W. 311)	The County of Monmouthshire (Electoral Arrangements) Order 2021
1233 (W. 312)	The A55 Trunk Road (Conwy Tunnel, Conwy County Borough) (Temporary Traffic Prohibitions and Restrictions) Order 2021
1234	The General Optical Council (Continuing Professional Development) Rules Order of Council 2021
1235	The Trade Marks and International Trade Marks (Amendment) (EU Exit) Regulations 2021
1236 (C. 67)	The Pension Schemes Act 2021 (Commencement No. 4) Regulations 2021
1237	The Occupational and Personal Pension Schemes (Conditions for Transfers) Regulations 2021
1238	The Air Navigation (Restriction of Flying) (Helicopter Flight) (No. 6) Regulations 2021
1239	The Football Spectators (Seating) Order 2021
1240 (W. 313)	The M48 Motorway (Junction 2 (Newhouse Interchange), Chepstow, Monmouthshire) (Temporary Prohibition of Vehicles) Order 2021
1241 (W. 314)	The M4 Motorway (Slip Roads at Junction 48 (Hendy), Carmarthenshire) (Temporary 30 mph & 50 mph Speed Limits) Order 2021
1242	The Road Vehicle Carbon Dioxide Emission Performance Standards (Cars and Vans) (Miscellaneous Amendments) Regulations 2021
1243 (C. 68) (W. 315)	The Additional Learning Needs and Education Tribunal (Wales) Act 2018 (Commencement No. 5 and Transitional and Saving Provisions) Order 2021
1244 (C. 69) (W. 316)	The Additional Learning Needs and Education Tribunal (Wales) Act 2018 (Commencement No. 6 and Transitional and Saving Provisions) Order 2021
1245 (W. 317) (C. 70)	The Additional Learning Needs and Education Tribunal (Wales) Act 2018 (Commencement No. 7) Order 2021
1246	Not Allocated
1247 (W. 319)	The Representation of the People (Amendment) (Wales) (Coronavirus) (No. 2) Regulations 2021
1248 (W. 320)	The Health Protection (Coronavirus Restrictions) (No. 5) (Wales) (Amendment) (No. 19) Regulations 2021
1249 (W. 321) (C. 71)	The Local Government and Elections (Wales) Act 2021 (Commencement No. 4 and Transitional Provision and Amendment of Commencement Order No. 1) Order 2021
1250 (W. 322)	The A494 Trunk Road (High Street, Bala, Gwynedd) (Temporary Prohibition of Vehicles) Order 2021
1251	The Motor Vehicles (Driving Licences) (Amendment) (No. 4) Regulations 2021
1252	The Financial Services (Gibraltar) (Amendment) (EU Exit) Regulations 2021
1253	Not Allocated
1254	The Air Navigation (Restriction of Flying) (COP26) (Amendment) Regulations 2021
1255	The Inspectors of Education, Children's Services and Skills (No. 4) Order 2021
1256	The Republic of Belarus (Sanctions) (Overseas Territories) (Amendment) Order 2021
1257	The Republic of Belarus (Sanctions) (EU Exit) (Isle of Man) Order 2021
1258	The Copyright and Performances (Application to Other Countries) (Amendment) (No. 2) Order 2021
1259	The South Humber Bank Energy Centre Order 2021
1260	The Exempt Charities Order 2021
1261	Not Allocated
1262	The National Security and Investment Act 2021 (Monetary Penalties) (Turnover of a Business) Regulations 2021
1263	Not Allocated
1264	The National Security and Investment Act 2021 (Notifiable Acquisition) (Specification of Qualifying Entities) Regulations 2021
1265	The Transfer of Functions (Secretary of State for Levelling Up, Housing and Communities) Order 2021
1266	The Organics (Equivalence and Control Bodies Listing) (Amendment) Regulations 2021
1267	The National Security and Investment Act 2021 (Procedure for Service) Regulations 2021
1268	Not Allocated
1269	The Private Storage Aid for Pigmeat (England) Regulations 2021
1270	The Authorised Investment Funds (Tax) (Amendment) Regulations 2021
1271	The Products Containing Meat etc. (England) (Amendment) Regulations 2021
1272	The National Security and Investment Act 2021 (Prescribed Form and Content of Notices and Validation Applications) Regulations 2021
1273	The Product Safety and Metrology etc. (Amendment) Regulations 2021
1274 (C. 72)	The Environment Act 2021 (Commencement No. 1) Regulations 2021
1275	The Power to Award Degrees etc. (Hull College Group) Order of Council 2015 (Amendment) Order 2021
1276	The Non-Domestic Rating (Discretionary Relief) (Amendment) (England) Regulations 2021
1277	The Immigration (Isle of Man) (Amendment) Order 2021
1278	The Greater London Authority (Consolidated Council Tax Requirement Procedure) Regulations 2021
1279	The Prison and Young Offender Institution (Amendment) Rules 2021
1280 (C. 73)	The Prisons (Substance Testing) Act 2021 (Commencement) Regulations 2021
1281	The Immigration (Jersey) Order 2021
1282	The Excise Duties (Removal of Alcoholic Liquor to Northern Ireland and Miscellaneous Amendments) Regulations 2021
1283	The Universal Credit (Work Allowance and Taper) (Amendment) Regulations 2021
1284 (W. 323)	The Glyn Rhonwy Pumped Storage Generating Station (Amendment) (Wales) Order 2021
1285 (W. 324)	The Representation of the People (Variation of Limits of Candidates’ Election Expenses) (Wales) Order 2021
1286	The Tax Credits and Child Benefit (Miscellaneous Amendments) Regulations 2021
1287 (W. 325)	The A458 Trunk Road (Broad Street & High Street, Welshpool, Powys) (Temporary Prohibition of Vehicles) Order 2021
1288	The Taking Control of Goods (Fees) (Amendment) Regulations 2021
1289	The Health Protection (Coronavirus, International Travel and Operator Liability) (England) (Amendment) (No. 18) Regulations 2021
1290	The Free Zone (Customs Site No. 1 Teesside) Designation Order 2021
1291 (W. 326)	The Health Protection (Coronavirus, International Travel and Restrictions) (Wales) (Miscellaneous Amendments) Regulations 2021
1292 (W. 327)	The Avian Influenza (H5N1 in Wild Birds) (Wales) (Amendment) Order 2021
1293	Not Allocated
1294 (W. 328)	The Education (European University Institute) (Wales) (Amendment) (EU Exit) Regulations 2021
1295	Not Allocated
1296 (W. 329)	The A470 Trunk Road (Bridge Street, Llanrwst, Conwy) (Temporary Prohibition of Vehicles, Cyclists and Pedestrians) Order 2021
1297 (W. 330)	The Development Procedure (Consultees) (Wales) (Miscellaneous Amendments) (Amendment) Order 2021
1298 (W. 331)	The A470 Trunk Road (Caersws, Powys) (Temporary Prohibition of Vehicles) Order 2021
1299 (W. 332)	The A470 Trunk Road (Cemmaes and Cwm Llinau, Powys) (Temporary Prohibition of Vehicles) Order 2021
1300	The UK Statistics (Amendment etc.) (EU Exit) Regulations 2021
1301	The Social Security (Scotland) Act 2018 (Disability Assistance for Children and Young People) (Consequential Modifications) (No. 2) Order 2021
1302	The Pensions Act 2004 (Code of Practice) (Contribution Notices: Circumstances in Relation to the Material Detriment Test, the Employer Insolvency Test and the Employer Resources Test) Appointed Day Order 2021
1303 (W. 333)	The A40 Trunk Road (Robeston Wathen Roundabout to Pengawse Hill Junction, Pembrokeshire) (Temporary Traffic Prohibitions and Restrictions) Order 2021
1304 (W. 334)	The Health Protection (Coronavirus Restrictions) (No. 5) (Wales) (Amendment) (No. 20) Regulations 2021
1305	The Avian Influenza (H5N1 in Wild Birds) (England) (Amendment) Order 2021
1306 (W. 335)	The Valuation for Rating (Wales) (Coronavirus) (Revocation) Regulations 2021
1307	The Avian Influenza (H5N1 in Wild Birds) (England) (Amendment) (No. 2) Order 2021
1308	The Occupational Pensions (Revaluation) Order 2021
1309 (S. 2)	The Environmental Authorisations (Scotland) Regulations 2018 (Transitional and Savings Provisions) Order 2021
1310	The Redress for Survivors (Historical Child Abuse in Care) (Scotland) Act 2021 (Consequential Provisions) Order 2021
1311	The Air Navigation (Restriction of Flying) (Edinburgh) Regulations 2021
1312	The Customs Importation (Miscellaneous Provisions and Amendment) (EU Exit) Regulations 2021
1313	The Air Navigation (Restriction of Flying) (Portsmouth Harbour) (No. 2) Regulations 2021
1314	The West Hertfordshire Hospitals National Health Service Trust (Establishment) (Amendment) Order 2021
1315 (S. 3)	The Environmental Authorisations (Scotland) Regulations 2018 (Consequential Modifications) Order 2021
1316	The Merchant Shipping (Radiocommunications) (Amendment) Regulations 2021
1317	The Borough Council of Calderdale (A629, Southern Section, Halifax) (Highway Improvements) (West Yorkshire Plus Transport Fund, Phase 1b) (Calder and Hebble Navigation Bridge) Scheme 2020 Confirmation Instrument 2021
1318	The Terrorism Act 2000 (Proscribed Organisations) (Amendment) (No. 3) Order 2021
1319	The State Pension Debits and Credits (Revaluation) Order 2021
1320	The State Pension Revaluation for Transitional Pensions Order 2021
1321 (W. 336)	The Health Protection (Coronavirus, International Travel) (Wales) (Amendment) (No. 12) Regulations 2021
1322	The Equality Act 2010 (Commencement No. 16) (Wales and Scotland) Order 2021
1323	The Health Protection (Coronavirus, International Travel and Operator Liability) (England) (Amendment) (No. 19) Regulations 2021
1324 (W. 337)	The A470 Trunk Road (Llanrwst Road, Llansanffraid Glan Conwy, Conwy) (40 mph Speed Limit) Order 2021
1325 (W. 339	The A470 Trunk Road (Talerddig, Powys) (Temporary Prohibition of Vehicles) Order 2021
1326 (W. 339)	The A40 Trunk Road (Llandovery, Carmarthenshire to Trecastle, Powys) (Temporary Traffic Prohibitions & Restrictions) Order 2021
1327 (W. 340)	The Health Protection (Coronavirus, International Travel) (Wales) (Amendment) (No. 13) Regulations 2021
1328 (W. 341)	The A487 Trunk Road (Great Darkgate Street & Owain Glyndwr Square, Aberystwyth, Ceredigion) (Temporary Prohibition of Vehicles) Order 2021
1329 (W. 342)	The Health Protection (Coronavirus, International Travel) (Wales) (Amendment) (No. 14) Regulations 2021
1330 (W. 343)	The Health Protection (Coronavirus, International Travel) (Wales) (Amendment) (No. 15) Regulations 2021
1331	The Health Protection (Coronavirus, International Travel and Operator Liability) (England) (Amendment) (No. 20) Regulations 2021
1332	The Conformity Assessment (Mutual Recognition Agreements) (Construction Products) (Amendment) Regulations 2021
1333 (W. 344)	The Non-Domestic Rating Contributions (Wales) (Amendment) Regulations 2021
1334 (W. 345)	The A40 Trunk Road (Brecon Bypass, Powys) (Temporary Prohibition of Vehicles, Cyclists and Pedestrians) Order 2021
1335	The Green Gas Support Scheme Regulations 2021
1336	The Upwell Internal Drainage Board Order 2021
1337	The Air Navigation (Restriction of Flying) (Royal Air Force Waddington) Regulations 2021
1338	The Health Protection (Coronavirus, Restrictions) (Self-Isolation) (England) (Amendment) (No. 4) Regulations 2021
1339	The Health Protection (Coronavirus, International Travel and Operator Liability) (England) (Amendment) (No. 21) Regulations 2021
1340	Health Protection (Coronavirus, Wearing of Face Coverings) (England) Regulations 2021
1341	The Income Tax (Exemption of Social Security Benefits) Regulations 2021
1342 (W. 346)	The Health Protection (Coronavirus, International Travel and Public Health Information to Travellers) (Wales) (Amendment) (No. 3) Regulations 2021
1343	The Local Authorities (Funds) (England) (Amendment) (Coronavirus) Regulations 2021
1344	The Income Tax (Qualifying Child Care) (Wales) Regulations 2021
1345 (W. 347)	The Government of Wales Act 2006 (Budget Motions and Designated Bodies) (Amendment) Order 2021
1346	The National Health Service (Charges, Primary Medical Services and Pharmaceutical and Local Pharmaceutical Services) (Coronavirus) (Further Amendments) Regulations 2021
1347	The Customs and Excise Border Procedures (Miscellaneous Amendments) (EU Exit) (No. 2) Regulations 2021
1348	The Education (Student Fees, Awards and Support) (Amendment) (No. 3) Regulations 2021
1349 (W. 348)	The Corporate Joint Committees (General) (No. 2) (Wales) Regulations 2021
1350 (W. 349))	The Environment (Wales) Act 2016 (Public Authorities subject to the Biodiversity and Resilience of Ecosystems Duty) Regulations 2021
1351 (W. 350)	The Equality Act 2010 (Authorities subject to a duty regarding Socio-economic Inequalities) (No. 2) (Wales) Regulations 2021
1352 (W. 351)	The Welsh Language Standards (No. 1) Regulations 2015 (Amendment) Regulations 2021
1353	The Transfer of Undertakings (Protection of Employment) (Transfer of Staff to the Office for Environmental Protection) Regulations 2021
1354 (W. 352)	The Health Protection (Coronavirus, International Travel) (Wales) (Amendment) (No. 16) Regulations 2021
1355 (W. 353)	The Countryside and Rights of Way Act 2000 (Meaning of Public Body) (Wales) Regulations 2021
1356 (W. 354)	The A458 Trunk Road (Spring Bank, Welshpool, Powys) (Temporary Prohibition of Vehicles) Order 2021
1357	The Littering From Vehicles Outside London (Keepers: Civil Penalties) (Amendment) Regulations 2021
1358	The Import and Export Licensing (Miscellaneous Amendments) Regulations 2021
1359 (W. 355)	The National Parks and Access to the Countryside Act 1949 (Meaning of Public Body) (Wales) Regulations 2021
1360 (W. 356)	The Corporate Joint Committees (Amendment of the Well-being of Future Generations (Wales) Act 2015) Regulations 2021
1361 (W. 357)	The Children and Families (Wales) Measure 2010 (Amendment to the List of Welsh Authorities) Regulations 2021
1362	The Reservoirs Act (Panels of Civil Engineers) (Applications and Fees) Regulations 2021
1363 (W. 358)	The Health Protection (Coronavirus Restrictions) (No. 5) (Wales) (Amendment) (No. 21) Regulations 2021
1364 (W. 359)	The Child Poverty Strategy (Corporate Joint Committees) (Wales) Regulations 2021
1365 (W. 360)	The Education (Student Fees, Awards and Support) (Amendment) (Wales) Regulations 2021
1366 (W. 361)	The Health Protection (Coronavirus, International Travel) (Wales) (Amendment) (No. 17) Regulations 2021
1367	The Health Protection (Coronavirus, International Travel and Operator Liability) (England) (Amendment) (No. 22) Regulations 2021
1368	The Food (Promotion and Placement) (England) Regulations 2021
1369 (W. 362)	The Health Protection (Coronavirus, International Travel and Public Health Information to Travellers) (Wales) (Miscellaneous Amendments) (No. 4) Regulations 2021
1370	The Carriage of Dangerous Goods and Use of Transportable Pressure Equipment (Amendment) (EU Exit) Regulations 2021
1371	The Health Protection (Coronavirus, International Travel and Operator Liability) (England) (Amendment) (No. 23) Regulations 2021
1372 (C. 76)	The Mental Health Units (Use of Force) Act 2018 (Commencement No. 2) Regulations 2021
1373 (C. 77)	The Trade Union Act 2016 (Commencement No. 4 and Transitional) Regulations 2021
1374	The Statistics of Trade (Customs and Excise) (Modification) Regulations 2021
1375	The Customs and Value Added Tax (Managed Transition Procedure) (EU Exit) Regulations 2021
1376	The Financial Services Act 2021 (Prudential Regulation of Credit Institutions and Investment Firms) (Consequential Amendments and Miscellaneous Provisions) Regulations 2021
1377	The Electronic Communications (Universal Service) (Costs) (Amendment) Regulations 2021
1378	The Education (Student Loans) (Repayment) (Amendment) (No. 4) Regulations 2021
1379	The Coroners (Inquests) (Amendment) Rules 2021
1380	The Rent Officers (Housing Benefit and Universal Credit Functions) (Amendment and Modification) Order 2021
1381	The Antique Firearms (Amendment) Regulations 2021
1382	The Health Protection (Coronavirus, Restrictions) (Self-Isolation) (England) (Amendment) (No. 5) Regulations 2021
1383 (W. 363)	The Food Information (Wales) (Amendment) Regulations 2021
1384	The Power to Award Degrees etc. (The London Institute of Banking & Finance) Order 2021
1385	The London Capital and Finance Compensation Scheme (Chargeable Gains Exemption) Regulations 2021
1386	The Terrorism Prevention and Investigation Measures Act 2011 (Continuation) Order 2021
1387 (W. 364)	The County of Powys (Electoral Arrangements) (Amendment) Order 2021
1388	The Financial Services and Markets Act 2000 (Consequential Amendments of References to Rules) Regulations 2021
1389	The Designation of Freeport Tax Sites (Freeport East) Regulations 2021
1390	The Air Navigation (Restriction of Flying) (Portsmouth Harbour) (No. 3) Regulations 2021
1391	The Building Regulations etc. (Amendment) (England) Regulations 2021
1392	The Building Regulations etc. (Amendment) (England) (No. 2) Regulations 2021
1393	Not Allocated
1394 (C. 78)	The Pension Schemes Act 2021 (Commencement No. 5) Regulations 2021
1395	The Restriction of the Use of Certain Hazardous Substances in Electrical and Electronic Equipment (Amendment) Regulations 2021
1396	The Common Organisation of the Markets in Agricultural Products (Marketing Standards and Organic Products) (Transitional Provisions) (Amendment) Regulations 2021
1397	The Ozone-Depleting Substances (Grant of Halon Derogations) Regulations 2021
1398	Not Allocated
1399	The Coronavirus Act 2020 (Early Expiry) (No. 2) Regulations 2021
1400	The Health Protection (Coronavirus, Wearing of Face Coverings) (England) (Amendment) Regulations 2021
1401	The Merchant Shipping (Polar Code) (Safety) Regulations 2021
1402	The Heavy Commercial Vehicles in Kent (No. 2) (Amendment) (No. 2) Order 2021
1403 (W, 365)	The Eligible Community Councils (General Power of Competence) (Qualifications of Clerks) (Wales) Regulations 2021
1404	The Burundi (Sanctions) Regulations 2021
1405	The Social Security (Income and Capital Disregards) (Amendment) Regulations 2021
1406	The Nuclear Safeguards (Fees) Regulations 2021
1407 (W, 366)	The Health Protection (Coronavirus Restrictions) (No. 5) (Wales) (Amendment) (No. 22) Regulations 2021
1408	The Solvency 2 (Group Supervision) (Amendment) Regulations 2021
1409 (C. 79)	The Finance Act 2021, Part 2 etc. (Plastic Packaging Tax) (Appointed Day) Regulations 2021
1410	Not Allocated
1411 (W. 367)	The M48 Motorway (Eastbound and Westbound Exit Slip Roads at Junction 2 (Newhouse Roundabout), Chepstow) (40 mph Speed Limit) Regulations 2021
1412	The Wireless Telegraphy (Licence Charges for the 2100 MHz Frequency Band) Regulations 2021
1413	The Eggs (England) Regulations 2021
1414	The Norfolk Boreas Offshore Wind Farm Order 2021
1415	The Health Protection (Coronavirus, Restrictions) (Self-Isolation) (England) (Amendment) (No. 6) Regulations 2021
1416	Health Protection (Coronavirus, Restrictions) (Entry to Venues and Events) (England) Regulations 2021
1417	The Plastic Packaging Tax (Descriptions of Products) Regulations 2021
1418 (W. 368)	The Equality Act 2010 (Disabled School Pupils) (Wales) Regulations 2021
1419	The Royal Borough of Greenwich (Electoral Changes) Order 2021
1420	The Renewable Transport Fuel Obligations (Amendment) Order 2021
1421	The Income Tax (Indexation of Blind Person's Allowance and Married Couple's Allowance) Order 2021
1422	The Van Benefit and Car and Van Fuel Benefit (No. 2) Order 2021
1423	The Civil Legal Aid (Financial Resources and Payment for Services) (Amendment) Regulations 2021
1424	The St Helens (Electoral Changes) Order 2021
1425	The London Borough of Barking and Dagenham (Electoral Changes) Order 2021
1426	The Regulatory Enforcement and Sanctions Act 2008 (Amendment to Schedule 3) (England) Order 2021
1427	The Misuse of Drugs (Amendment) (England, Wales and Scotland) Regulations 2021
1428 (W. 369) (C. 80)	The Additional Learning Needs and Education Tribunal (Wales) Act 2018 (Amendment of Commencement Order No. 5 and Commencement Order No. 6) Order 2021
1429	The Sea Fisheries (Amendment etc.) (No. 2) Regulations 2021
1430	The Designation of Rural Primary Schools (England) Order 2021
1431 (W. 370)	The Federation of Maintained Schools (Wales) (Amendment) Regulations 2021
1432	The Free Zone (Customs Site No. 1 Thames) Designation Order 2021
1433 (W. 371)	The Health Protection (Coronavirus, International Travel and Public Health Information to Travellers) (Wales) (Miscellaneous Amendments) (No. 5) Regulations 2021
1434	The Health Protection (Coronavirus, International Travel and Operator Liability) (England) (Amendment) (No. 24) Regulations 2021
1435	The Health Protection (Coronavirus, Restrictions) (Entry to Venues and Events) (England) (Amendment) Regulations 2021
1436	The Registration of Births and Deaths (Amendment) (England and Wales) Regulations 2021
1437	The Civil Aviation (Customs and Excise Airports) Order 2021
1438	The Power to Award Degrees etc. (Dyson Technical Training Limited) (Amendment) Order 2021
1439	The Power to Award Degrees etc. (The London Interdisciplinary School Ltd) (Amendment) Order 2021
1440	The Agricultural Holdings (Units of Production) (England) (No. 2) Order 2021
1441	The Government Resources and Accounts Act 2000 (Estimates and Accounts) (Amendment) Order 2021
1442	The Customs Importation (Miscellaneous Provisions and Amendment) (EU Exit) (Amendment) Regulations 2021
1443	The Official Controls (Extension of Transitional Periods) (England and Wales) (Amendment) (No. 2) Regulations 2021
1444	The Taxation (Cross-border Trade) (Miscellaneous Amendments) (EU Exit) (No. 2) Regulations 2021
1445	The Customs Safety and Security Procedures (EU Exit) (No. 2) Regulations 2021
1446	The Inspectors of Education, Children's Services and Skills (No. 5) Order 2021
1447	The Double Taxation Relief and International Tax Enforcement (Taiwan) Order 2021
1448	The Carriage by Air (Revision of Limits of Liability under the Montreal Convention) Order 2021
1449	The Health Protection (Coronavirus, International Travel and Operator Liability) (England) (Amendment) (No. 25) Regulations 2021
1450	The Motor Vehicles (Driving Licences) (Amendment) (No. 5) Regulations 2021
1451 (L. 20)	The Non-Contentious Probate Fees (Amendment) Order 2021
1452	The Human Medicines (Amendment) (Supply to Northern Ireland) Regulations 2021
1453	The Statutory Sick Pay (Medical Evidence) Regulations 2021
1454	The Approved Country Lists (Animals and Animal Products) (Amendment) (No. 2) Regulations 2021
1455	The Greenhouse Gas Emissions Trading Scheme (Amendment) Order 2021
1456 (W. 372)	The Coronavirus Act 2020 (Residential Tenancies: Extension of Period of Protection from Eviction) (No. 4) (Wales) Regulations 2021
1457 (W. 373)	The Additional Learning Needs and Education Tribunal (Wales) Act 2018 (Consequential Amendments) (No. 3) Regulations 2021
1458	The Age of Criminal Responsibility (Scotland) Act 2019 (Consequential Provisions and Modifications) Order 2021
1459 (W. 374)	The Local Elections (Principal Areas) (Wales) Rules 2021
1460 (W. 375)	Rheolau Etholiadau Lleol (Cymunedau) (Cymru) 2021
1461	The Network and Information Systems (EU Exit) (Amendment) Regulations 2021
1462	Not Allocatd
1463	The Health Protection (Coronavirus, International Travel and Operator Liability) (England) (Amendment) (No. 26) Regulations 2021
1464	The Town and Country Planning (General Permitted Development etc.) (England) (Amendment) (No. 3) Order 2021
1465 (C. 81)	The National Security and Investment Act 2021 (Commencement No. 2 and Transitional and Saving Provision) Regulations 2021
1466	The Power to Award Degrees etc. (College of Legal Practice Limited) Order 2021
1467	The Electric Vehicles (Smart Charge Points) Regulations 2021
1468 (W. 376)	The Health Protection (Coronavirus Restrictions) (No. 5) (Wales) (Amendment) (No. 23) Regulations 2021
1469	The Transfer of Functions (Vaccine Damage Payments) Order 2021
1470 (W. 377)	The Landfill Disposals Tax (Tax Rates) (Wales) (Amendment) Regulations 2021
1471	The Wine (Amendment) Regulations 2021
1472	The Exotic Animal Disease (Amendment) (England) Order 2021
1473	The Worcestershire County Council (Kepax Bridge) Scheme 2020 Confirmation Instrument 2021
1474	The Hinkley Point C (Nuclear Generating Station) (Amendment) Order 2021
1475	The Air Navigation (Restriction of Flying) (Belarusian Aircraft) Regulations 2021
1476 (W. 378)	The Education (School Day and School Year) (Wales) (Amendment) (Coronavirus) Regulations 2021
1477 (W. 379)	The Health Protection (Coronavirus Restrictions) (No. 5) (Wales) (Amendment) (No. 24) Regulations 2021
1478 (W. 380)	The Morlais Demonstration Zone Order 2021
1479 (W. 381)	The A5 Trunk Road (Antelope Roundabout, Bangor, Gwynedd to the Junction of Lon Refail, Llanfairpwll, Anglesey) (Temporary Traffic Prohibitions and Restrictions) Order 2021
1480 (W. 382)	The Official Controls (Extension of Transitional Periods and Miscellaneous Amendments) (Wales) (EU Exit) Regulations 2021
1481 (W. 383)	The A4810 Steelworks Access Road (Queen's Way), (Llanwern, Newport) (Temporary Speed Limits and Clearway) Order 2021
1482 (W. 384)	The A55 Trunk Road (Junction 1 (Kingsland Roundabout), Holyhead, Anglesey to east of Junction 11 (Llys y Gwynt Interchange), Bangor, Gwynedd) (Temporary Traffic Restrictions & Prohibition) Order 2021
1483 (W. 385)	The A487 Trunk Road (Parc Menai Roundabout to Antelope Roundabout, Bangor, Gwynedd) (Temporary Traffic Prohibitions and Restrictions) Order 2021
1484	The Air Navigation (Restriction of Flying) (Edinburgh) (Revocation) Regulations 2021
1485 (W. 386)	The Health Protection (Coronavirus Restrictions) (No. 5) (Wales) (Amendment) (No. 25) Regulations 2021
1486 (W. 387)	The A40 Trunk Road (Llandeilo to Llandovery, Carmarthenshire) (Temporary Speed Restrictions & No Overtaking) Order 2021
1487 (W. 388)	The A44 Trunk Road (Goginan to Capel Bangor, Ceredigion) (Temporary Prohibition of Vehicles) Order 2021
1488 (W. 389)	The A40 Trunk Road (St Clears, Carmarthenshire to Haverfordwest, Pembrokeshire) (Temporary Speed Restrictions & No Overtaking) Order 2021
1489	The Customs (Miscellaneous Provisions) (Amendment) (EU Exit) Regulations 2021
1490 (W. 390)	The Health Protection (Coronavirus Restrictions) (No. 5) (Wales) (Amendment) (No. 26) Regulations 2021
1491	The Official Controls (Temporary Measures) (Coronavirus) (Amendment) (No. 3) Regulations 2021
1492 (W. 391)	The A487 Trunk Road (Fishguard, Pembrokeshire to Cardigan, Ceredigion) (Temporary Traffic Restrictions & Prohibitions) Order 2021
1493 (W. 392)	The A489 Trunk Road (Cemmaes Road to Machynlleth, Powys) (Temporary Speed Restrictions and No Overtaking) Order 2021
1494 (W. 393)	The A48 Trunk Road (Cross Hands Roundabout to Pont Abraham Roundabout, Carmarthenshire) (Temporary Traffic Prohibitions and Restrictions) Order 2021
