= Health Protection (Coronavirus, Restrictions) (All Tiers and Self-Isolation) (England) (Amendment) Regulations 2021 =

- Statutory Instrument
- Parliament of the United Kingdom
- Citation: SI 2021/97

Dates
- Made: 28 January 2021
- Laid before Parliament: 29 January 2021
- Commencement: 29 January 2021

Other legislation
- Made under: Public Health (Control of Disease) Act 1984

Status: Current legislation

Text of the Health Protection (Coronavirus, Restrictions) (All Tiers and Self-Isolation) (England) (Amendment) Regulations 2021 as in force today (including any amendments) within the United Kingdom, from legislation.gov.uk.

The Health Protection (Coronavirus, Restrictions) (All Tiers and Self-Isolation) (England) (Amendment) Regulations 2021 (SI 2021/97) is an emergency statute in response to the COVID-19 pandemic in England, which came into force at 5.00pm on 29 January 2021.

The Regulations increase from £200 to £800 the amount an individual attending a house party involving more than fifteen people can be fined for a first offence. The Regulations also broaden (by amending the Health Protection (Coronavirus, Restrictions) (Self-Isolation) (England) Regulations 2020) the personal details that health service personnel or local authority personnel may disclose about an individual, and extend the permitted uses of those details to include the prevention, investigation, detection or prosecution of offences under those Regulations.

Whilst these Regulations have not themselves expired or been revoked, all of the regulations they amended are no longer in effect.
