= Tier =

Tier(s) or TIER may refer to:

== Groupings ==
- Tier, a layer of technology in multitier architecture, a tier-based system in software architecture
- Tier (emission standard), rankings of emission standards in the US
- Tier, a rank of suppliers in a supply chain
- Tier list, a list of playable characters ranked by their abilities in competitive settings

== Physical levels ==
- Tier, a level of a multi-layered cake stand
- Tier, a level or shelf in an étagère
- Tier, a level of seating in a theatre seating

== Places ==
- The Tiers, a 19th-century name for the Adelaide Hills, South Australia
- Tiers, South Tyrol, a municipality in Italy

== Songs ==
- "Tier" (song), by German band Rammstein
- "Tier", a song by Käptn Peng & Die Tentakel von Delphi from Das nullte Kapitel

== Other uses ==
- Taiwan Institute of Economic Research (TIER), one of two major economic research institutes in Taiwan
- Tier, row of moorings or anchorages for ships
- Tier Mobility, a shared e-scooter operator company from Germany
- Tier Sinclair, a fictional character in Marvel Comics
- Tiers, a French term meaning a third, for tremissis, coins of the Roman and Merovingian periods

== See also ==
- Northern Tier (disambiguation)
- Tier 1 (disambiguation)
- Tier 2 (disambiguation)
- Tier 3 (disambiguation)
- Tier 4 (disambiguation)
- Data centre tiers
- World of Tiers, a series of science fiction novels by American writer Philip José Farmer
