= Three-tier system =

Three-tier system may refer to:

- Multitier architecture, a client–server architecture in software engineering, typically of three tiers
- Three-tier system (alcohol distribution), the system established in the U.S. after the repeal of Prohibition
- Three-tier education, structures of schooling in England
- First COVID-19 tier regulations in England, 14 October – 5 November 2020
- Second COVID-19 tier regulations in England, 2 December 2020 – 29 March 2021, on 20 December it became four-tier

== See also ==
- Tier 1 (disambiguation)
- Tier 2 (disambiguation)
- Tier 3 (disambiguation)
- Tier 4 (disambiguation)
