= Substantial meal =

Legal term of art

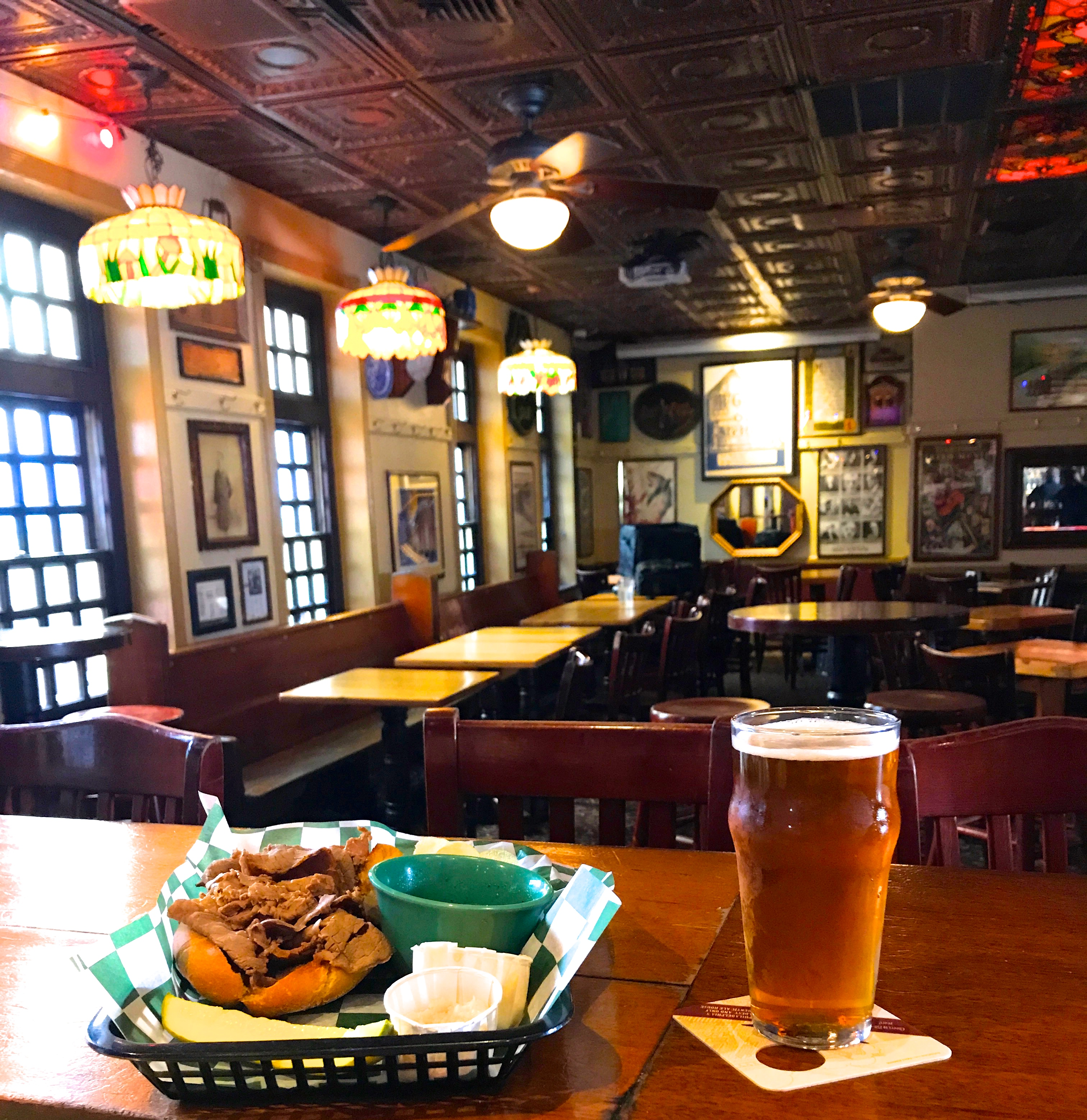
An example of a pub meal

A substantial meal or table meal is a legal term of art regarding the application of alcohol licensing laws in England and Wales. The purported definition of "substantial meal" generated significant press discussion during the 2020 COVID-19 pandemic in spite of the fact that the English COVID-19 regulations made no use of the expression, instead referring to "main meal" and later to "table meal".

== History ==
In Soloman v Green (1955), the High Court held that sandwiches and sausages on sticks amounted to a meal under English and Welsh law. The Licensing Act 1964 defined "table service" as "a meal eaten by a person seated at a table, or at a counter or other structure that serves the purpose of a table and is not used for the service of refreshments for consumption by persons not seated at a table or structure serving the purpose of a table".

In Timmis v Millman (1965), where Millman and Yarnold had been consuming light ale and stout outside of permitted hours (but within the supper hour extension of the time), the High Court found the sandwiches the pair were eating constituted a "table meal" as they "were so substantial, and assisted by the pickles and beetroot so as to justify that it was a table meal and not a mere snack from the bar". The Licensing Act 2003 contains a clause which permits 16- or 17-year-olds to consume beer, wine or cider with a table meal if they are accompanied by an adult.

The terms "table meals", "substantial meals", "plated meals" and "substantial food" are considered analogous terms in a sample of 319 "statements of licensing policy" issued by local authorities (a document which details how they approach licensing applications in their area). Of the sampled documents, 95 made reference to one of these terms and a further 13 to alcohol being "ancillary to food" or a meal.

The terms have been criticised as subjective, and their application has been seen as being affected by snobbery. Research has shown that questions of "class and calibre" form part of the interpretation and enforcement of licensing conditions. For example, "high-end crisps" served in "substantial portions accompanied with various elaborate dips" were considered a substantial meal in a 2017 Westminster City Council hearing, with the council congratulating the owner on "[creating] a 'non-Walkers' crisp offer and the desire to celebrate the great British potato at its peak and most hip".

== COVID tier restrictions in England ==
During the October–November 2020 first COVID-19 tier regulations in England, pubs and restaurants in tier 3 areas were permitted to serve alcoholic drinks only with a "main meal". This was defined as being a meal at least equivalent to the main course of a main midday or evening meal. Summarising the effect of the regulations, Health Secretary Matt Hancock told Parliament that "pubs and bars must close unless operating as restaurants".

After the second lockdown, the all-tier regulations that came into force in December 2020 re-introduced a similar restriction but replaced the wording "main meal" with "table meal", that being defined as a meal at least equivalent to breakfast or the main course of a midday or evening meal.

Although in neither case did the legal regulations use the term "substantial meal", the government's COVID-19 Winter Plan stated "In tier 2, pubs and bars must close unless they are serving substantial meals (like a full breakfast, main lunchtime or evening meal), along with accompanying drinks." This restriction was reported to have had a significant impact on pubs that were led by alcohol sales ('wet-led' pubs).

In spite of the fact that the regulations made no use of the term, the press showed substantial interest in the definition of "substantial meal". In Manchester, 22-inch slices of pizza were argued to have been substantial after police initially shut down one bar for serving them alongside alcohol. Although ministers had no legal authority to define a "substantial meal", definitions offered by various politicians included one "you would expect to have as a midday meal or an evening meal", disregarding snacks such as crisps and chips; but not a Cornish pasty on its own, the PM's spokesman insisting that "bar snacks do not count".

Newspapers published articles on whether a scotch egg constituted a substantial meal. On 30 November 2020, the Environment and Food Secretary George Eustice stated that they "probably would count". According to Cabinet Office Minister Michael Gove, scotch eggs could not serve as substantial meal (though later claimed that it did), but the Health Secretary Matt Hancock said: "A scotch egg that is served as a substantial meal, that is a substantial meal."

In March 2021, the High Court granted judicial review of the "substantial meal" [sic] aspect of the regulations on the basis that it was arguably discriminatory towards people of non-White or BAME backgrounds who disproportionally relied on wet-led pubs and who could not afford substantial meals out. The case did not ultimately proceed to trial after the regulations were revoked.

== COVID restrictions in Ireland ==
In Ireland, on 29 June 2020, restaurants and cafés providing on-premises food and drink could re-open subject to social distancing measures and strict cleaning requirements. Bars and pubs offering table service only were permitted to re-open provided that customers bought a "substantial" meal costing at least €9.
