= Teir =

Teir may refer to:

- Breton for the number 3
- Irish for a taboo
- Grels Teir (1916–1999), Finnish lawyer and politician
- Sebastian Tier, Finnish musician

== See also ==
- Tier (disambiguation)
