= Tier 2 =

Tier 2 may refer to:

- Tier 2 capital, constituents of a bank's capital requirement
- Tier 2 network, a type of Internet service provider
- Scaled Composites Tier Two, a human spaceflight program
- Tier 2 in the First COVID-19 tier regulations in England, the middle level
- Tier 2 in the Second COVID-19 tier regulations in England
- Tier II, a data center standard
- Tier II, in United States vehicle emission standards

== See also ==
- Two-tier healthcare
- Multitier architecture
- WTA Tier II tournaments, Women's Tennis Association tennis second-level tournaments
- Three-tier system (disambiguation)
- Tier 1 (disambiguation)
- Tier 3 (disambiguation)
- Tier 4 (disambiguation)
- Tier II+, a remotely-piloted, surveillance aircraft
