= Food service =

Preparation of food outside the home

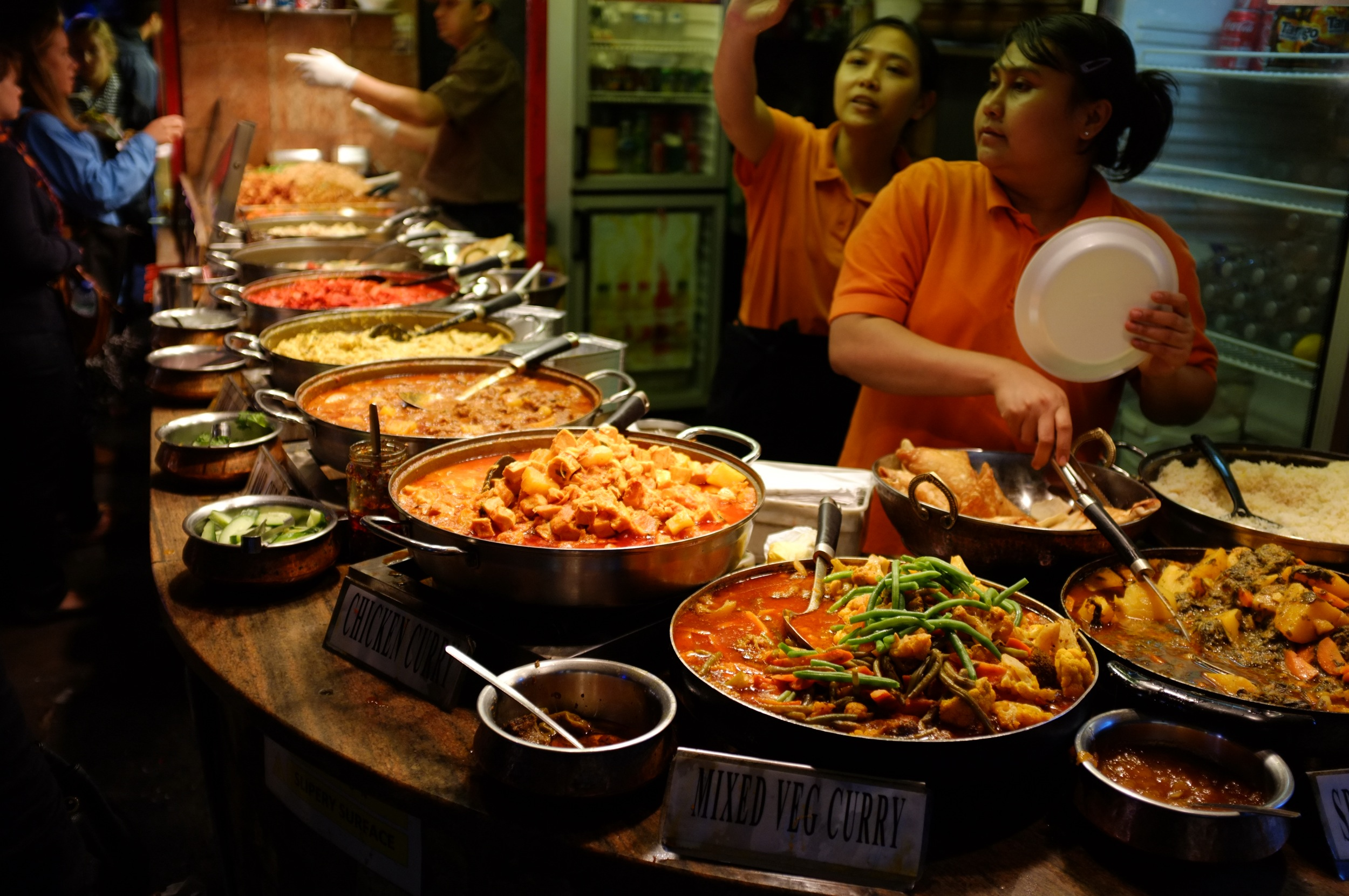
Business selling curry dishes

The food service (US English) or catering (British and Commonwealth English) industry includes the businesses, institutions, and companies which prepare meals outside the home. It includes restaurants, grocery stores, school and hospital cafeterias, catering operations, and many other formats.

Suppliers to food service operators are food service distributors, who provide small wares (kitchen utensils) and foods. Some companies manufacture products in both consumer and food service versions. The consumer version usually comes in individual-sized packages with elaborate label design for retail sale. The food service version is packaged in a much larger industrial size and often lacks the colorful label designs of the consumer version.

== Statistics ==
=== United States ===
The food system, including food service and food retailing, supplied $1.24 trillion worth of food in 2010 in the US. $594 billion of this was supplied by food service facilities, defined by the USDA as any place which prepares food for immediate consumption on site, including locations that are not primarily engaged in dispensing meals such as recreational facilities and retail stores. Full-service and fast food restaurants account for 77% of all food service sales, with full-service restaurants accounting for just slightly more than fast food in 2010. The shifts in the market shares between fast food and full-service restaurants to market demand changes the offerings of both foods and services of both types of restaurants.

According to the National Restaurant Association a growing trend among US consumers for the food service industry is global cuisine with 66% of US consumers eating more widely in 2015 than in 2010, 80% of consumers eating 'ethnic' cuisines at least once a month, and 29% trying a new 'ethnic' cuisine within the last year.

The food service distributor market size is, as of 2015, $231 billion in the US; the national broadline market is controlled by US Foods and Sysco which combined have a 60-70% share of the market and were blocked from merging by the FTC for reasons of market power.

== Health concerns ==
Food service foods tends to be, on average, higher in calories and lower in key nutrients than foods prepared at home. Many restaurants, including fast food, have added more salads and fruit offerings and either by choice or in response to local legislation provided nutrition labeling.

Eating one meal away from home each week translates to 2 extra pounds each year or a daily increase of 134 calories and a decrease in diet quality by 2 points on the Healthy Eating Index.

In addition; the likelihood of contracting a food-borne illness (such as typhoid and hepatitis B, or diseases caused by E. coli, H. pylori, Listeria, Salmonella, and norovirus) is greatly increased due to food not being kept below 40 °F (4 °C) or cooked to a temperature of higher than 160 °F (71 °C), not washing hands for at least 20 seconds for food handlers or not washing contaminated cutting boards and other kitchen tools in hot water.

=== United States ===
In the US, the FDA is moving towards establishing uniform guidelines for fast food and restaurant labeling. Its proposed rules were published in 2011 and final regulations published on 1 December 2014 which supersede State and local menu-labeling provisions, going into effect 1 December 2015. Research has shown that the new labels may influence consumer choices, but primarily if it provides unexpected information and that health-conscious consumers are resistant to changing behaviors based on menu labeling. Fast food restaurants are expected by the Economic Research Service to do better under the new menu labeling than full-service restaurants, as full-service restaurants tend to offer much more calorie-dense foods, with 50% of fast food meals being between 400 and 800 calories and less than 20% above 1000 calories. In contrast, full-service restaurants 20% of meals are above 1,400 calories. When consumers are aware of the calorie counts at full-service restaurants, 20% choose lower calorie options and consumers also reduce their calorie intake over the rest of the day.

== Types of service ==
=== Counter Service ===
Counter service is food ordered by the customer at the counter and either picked up at the counter by the customer or delivered to the table by restaurant staff. It is common in fast food restaurants in the United States, and in pubs and bars in the United Kingdom (see: Table meal).

=== Table service ===
Table service is food ordered by the customer at the table and served to the customer's table by waiting staff, also known as "servers". Table service is common in most restaurants. With table service, the customer generally pays at the end of a meal. Various methods of table service can be provided, such as silver service.

== Subsectors of the food service industry ==
Food service is often broken down into two categories: commercial and non-commercial.

=== Commercial ===
Commercial food service is a broad umbrella term that encapsulates all businesses that prepare and serve food and/or drinks to customers for profit.

This includes restaurants, fast food chains, cafes, food trucks, catering companies, bakeries, bars or pubs, food kiosks, and ghost kitchens among others.

==== Ghost kitchens ====
During the COVID-19 pandemic, which saw 52% growth of online food delivery sales, Ghost kitchens, or virtual restaurants, began to emerge in popularity.

Ghost kitchens are food service establishments that only offer food delivery options, and do not provide typical storefronts or dining areas.

Research estimated that ghost kitchens could be a $1 trillion industry by 2030.

=== Non-commercial ===
Non-commercial food service refers to food service operations that focus on serving a specific community and typically provide food options that are already paid for in some way or do not require a form of payment.

Places in which non-commercial food services can be found include schools, hospitals, community centers, and charitable organizations like soup kitchens, among others.

== Food safety ==
The provision of safe food for food service specifies the requirements for the design, implementation, and maintenance of prerequisite programs (PRPs) to assist in controlling hazards to food safety in catering. A technical specification is provided as an international standard, ISO/TS 22002-2:2013 Prerequisite programs on food safety — Part 2: Catering. This technical specification is part of the ISO 22000 family of standards. The scope includes catering, air catering, railway catering, banquets, among others, in central and satellite units, school and industry dining rooms, hospitals and healthcare facilities, hotels, restaurants, coffee shops, food services, and food stores.

The WHO states that each year, 1 in 10 people become sick from consuming unsafe food. They promote safe food handling for consumers and food handlers with their "five keys to safer food." These are: keep clean, separate raw and cooked, cook thoroughly, keep food at safe temperatures, and use safe water and raw materials.

== Food waste ==
Food waste is the number one material that ends up in landfills.

=== Statistics ===
It is estimated that about 2.6 trillion dollars worth of food is wasted every year.

According to the UNEP Food Waste Index Report from 2021, around 26% of all food waste generated in 2019 was from the food service industry.

==== United States ====
The National Restaurant Association estimates that 22 to 33 billion pounds of food waste are generated by restaurants in the United States each year. NPR states that restaurants alone are responsible for 15% of all food in landfills. Additionally, according to reports from Recycle Track Systems, the restaurant industry spends around $162 billion every year on food waste related costs.

== See also ==
- Horeca
