= Tier 1 =

Tier 1 or Tier One may refer to:

- Tier 1 capital, the core measure of a bank's financial strength
- Tier 1 network, category of Internet backbone network
- Scaled Composites Tier One, a suborbital human spaceflight program
- TierOne Bank
- Tier 1 nations in rugby union
- WTA Tier I tournaments, a series of elite women's tennis tournaments
- Tier 1 visas under the Points-based immigration system (United Kingdom)
- Tier 1 – UK Nuclear Site Management & Licensing, nuclear site management licensees
- Tier 1, a US military designation for special forces units, see special mission unit
- Tier 1 in the First COVID-19 tier regulations in England, the lowest concern
- Tier 1 in the Second COVID-19 tier regulations in England, the lowest concern
- Tier I, a data center standard
- Tier I, in United States vehicle emission standards
- In a supply chain, those suppliers who sell to the manufacturer or main customer directly

== See also ==
- Multitier architecture
- Two-tier healthcare
- Three-tier system (disambiguation)
- Tier 2 (disambiguation)
- Tier 3 (disambiguation)
- Tier 4 (disambiguation)
