= Health Protection (Coronavirus, Restrictions) (Steps) (England) Regulations 2021 =

United Kingdom emergency legislation

- Statutory Instrument
- Parliament of the United Kingdom
- Citation: SI 2021/364
- Introduced by: Matt Hancock, Secretary of State for Health and Social Care
- Territorial extent: England

Dates
- Made: 22 March 2021
- Laid before Parliament: 22 March 2021
- Commencement: 29 March 2021
- Revoked: 18 July 2021

Other legislation
- Repeals/revokes: Health Protection (Coronavirus, Restrictions) (All Tiers) (England) Regulations 2020
- Made under: Public Health (Control of Disease) Act 1984
- Revoked by: Health Protection (Coronavirus, Restrictions) (Steps etc.) (England) (Revocation and Amendment) Regulations 2021

Status: Revoked

Text of the Health Protection (Coronavirus, Restrictions) (Steps) (England) Regulations 2021 as in force today (including any amendments) within the United Kingdom, from legislation.gov.uk.

England step levels by district, from 17 May to 18 July 2021: Step 1 Step 2 Step 3

The Health Protection (Coronavirus, Restrictions) (Steps) (England) Regulations 2021 (SI 2021/364) is an English emergency statutory instrument which replaced the Health Protection (Coronavirus, Restrictions) (All Tiers) (England) Regulations 2020 from 29 March 2021. Initially, all of England was subject to Step 1 restrictions. Step 2 applied from 12 April 2021 and Step 3 from 17 May 2021. The regulations were originally set to expire on 30 June 2021, but that was later extended to the end of 18 July 2021. They were revoked on the latter date.

== Context and earlier regulations ==
A stepped approach to relaxation of pandemic-related restrictions in England was set out by the Cabinet Office in a document referred to as a "roadmap", published on 22 February 2021. These regulations partially enacted those intentions, and replaced almost all of the existing Health Protection (Coronavirus, Restrictions) (All Tiers) (England) Regulations 2020 which had been in force since 2 December 2020.

== Legal basis ==
The regulations were made on 22 March 2021 by the Secretary of State for Health and Social Care, Matt Hancock, using emergency powers under the Public Health (Control of Disease) Act 1984, the stated legal basis being "the serious and imminent threat to public health which is posed by the incidence and spread of severe acute respiratory syndrome coronavirus 2 (SARS-CoV-2) in England". Hancock used section 45R of the Public Health (Control of Disease) Act 1984 to enact the regulations without prior parliamentary consideration, subject to retrospective approval by resolution of each House of Parliament within twenty-eight days. The regulations entered into force on 29 March 2021.

== Step restrictions ==
The scheme of the regulations was to define three levels of personal and business restrictions, called "Steps". Step 1 was the most restrictive and Step 3 the least. Although the regulations were drafted so that different areas of England could be at different Step levels simultaneously, in the event all areas of England were placed into the same level and were moved as a bloc from Step 1 to Step 2 to Step 3.

== Step levels by date ==
Applied throughout England
	In effect	Ref
Step 1	29 March 2021–11 April 2021	
Step 2	12 April 2021–16 May 2021	
Step 3	17 May 2021 – 18 July 2021	

== General restrictions on gatherings ==
In all Step areas, gatherings were restricted by size, and unless one of the exceptions applied the only permitted gatherings were those shown in the table. Children were included in the counts, though certain exceptions – see below – allowed for larger gatherings with young children.

Permitted gatherings
Place	Step 1	Step 2	Step 3
Indoors	None permitted	None permitted	Up to 6 people from any number of households *
Outdoors (incl. private gardens)	Up to 6 people from any number of households *	Up to 6 people from any number of households *	Up to 30 people from any number of households

* See also the first two exceptions in the table below. These allowed, alternatively, any number of people from one or two households.

== Exceptions to the restrictions on gatherings ==
Certain larger gatherings were permitted if one of the following exceptions applied. The list was exhaustive, in the sense that no other reasons could be used to justify contravening the general restrictions on gatherings. In some cases the exception applied only where it was 'reasonably necessary', in other words where the purpose of the gathering could not reasonably be achieved in some other way.

Except where stated, the exceptions applied to both indoor and outdoor gatherings.

Allowable exceptions
Type	Details	Step 1	Step 2	Step 3
Same or linked households	All members of a common household, or of two linked households ("support bubble")	Allowed		N/A*
Two households or linked households	Gatherings of no more than two non-linked households. Linked households counted as one for this purpose	Allowed, outdoors only		Allowed
Education and training	A variety of specified situations including early years provision, school activities, apprenticeships, work experience, applying for a job, professional training and exams	Allowed		
Gatherings necessary for certain purposes	Work, voluntary services, emergency assistance, avoiding harm, providing care to a vulnerable or disabled person, for the purposes of a house move	Allowed		
Legal obligations and proceedings	Fulfilling a legal obligation or participating in legal proceedings	Allowed		
Criminal justice accommodation	Any gathering in criminal justice accommodation	Allowed		
Support groups	Support groups held at premises other than a private dwelling. Informal groups were allowed in Step 3, but in Steps 1 and 2 the group had to be organised with precautions by a business, charity or public body after a risk assessment.	Up to 15 people, not counting children under 5		Up to 30 people, not including children under 5
Respite care	Respite care for a vulnerable or disabled person; a short break for a looked-after child	Allowed		N/A*
Births	Attending a person giving birth	Allowed		N/A*
Visiting persons receiving treatment etc.	Visitor was a member of that person's household, a close family member, or a friend. Applied to hospitals, hospices and care homes	Allowed indoors		N/A*
Visiting a dying person	Visitor was a member of that person's household, a close family member, or a friend	Allowed indoors		N/A*
Marriages and civil partnerships etc.	Ceremonies (including non-faith ceremonies) organised with precautions after a risk assessment. Some restrictions below were relaxed for ceremonies where one of the parties was seriously ill and was not expected to recover. Until 20 June 2021: could not be held in a public place nor at a private dwelling, indoors or out After 20 June 2021: could not be held indoors in a private dwelling; no limit on numbers	Up to 6 people	Up to 15 people	Until 20 June 2021: up to 30 people; after 20 June 2021: no limit on numbers
Wedding and civil partnership receptions	Receptions organised with precautions after a risk assessment. Until 20 June 2021: could not be held in a public place nor at a private dwelling After 20 June 2021: could not be held indoors in a private dwelling; no limit on numbers	Not allowed	Outdoors only, up to 15 people	Until 20 June 2021: up to 30 people; after 20 June 2021: no limit on numbers
Significant event celebration	A ceremony, rite or ritual to mark a significant milestone in a person's life, according to religion or belief. The exception could not be used to celebrate a birthday other than a coming of age. Had to be organised with precautions after a risk assessment. Until 20 June 2021: had to be held at the premises of a business, charity or public body. Not allowed at a private dwelling, indoors or out After 20 June 2021: could not be held indoors in a private dwelling; no limit on numbers	Not allowed		Until 20 June 2021: up to 30 people; after 20 June 2021: no limit on numbers
Funerals	Organised with precautions after a risk assessment. Until 20 June 2021: had to be held in a public outdoor space or business or charity premises. Not allowed at a private dwelling, whether indoors or out. After 20 June 2021: allowed anywhere except indoors in a private dwelling.	Up to 30 people		Allowed
Commemorative event following a person's death	Events organised with precautions after a risk assessment. Not allowed at a private dwelling	Up to 6 people	Up to 15 people	Up to 30 people
Children	Formal childcare; informal childcare provided by a linked childcare household; access arrangements; contact between siblings who did not live together; prospective adopters	Allowed		
Parent and child groups	Parent and child groups organised by a business, charity or public body. Not allowed at a private dwelling in Steps 1 and 2, but formally-organised home meetings were permitted in Step 3	Not allowed	Up to 15 people, not counting children under 5	Up to 30 people, not counting children under 5
Student and vacation households	Allowed a student in higher education to move from their student to another household once before 30 June 2021 for the purpose of a vacation, and to return afterwards. The student became a part of the vacation household during the vacation period	Allowed		
Communal worship	Communal worship was allowed (without numerical restriction) provided it was organised with precautions after a risk assessment. Worshippers had to attend either alone or as part of a qualifying group, with no mingling between qualifying groups	If attending as part of a Step 1 or Step 2 qualifying group		N/A*, but allowed under 'Permitted organised gatherings'
Permitted organised gatherings	Gatherings organised by a business, charity or public body at private premises other than a private dwelling, or in a public outdoor place, with precautions after a risk assessment. Political bodies were also allowed to organise public outdoor gatherings. Attendees had to attend either alone or as part of a qualifying group, with no mingling between qualifying groups	Not allowed	Outdoors only, if attending as part of a Step 1-2 qualifying group	If attending as part of a Step 3 qualifying group
Protests	Organised with precautions by a business, charity, public body or political body after a risk assessment	Allowed		
Picketing	Picketing with precautions after a risk assessment	Allowed		
Organised sports/fitness	Taking part in sports or fitness activities organised with precautions by a business, charity or public body after a risk assessment. This exception did not extend to spectators or to parents of a child taking part	Allowed outdoors; indoors for disabled people only	Allowed outdoors; indoors for children and disabled people only	Allowed
Outdoor licensed activities	Taking part in an outdoor physical activity for which a licence or permit issued by a public body is required. Had to be organised with precautions after a risk assessment.	Allowed		
Elite sports	Necessary training and competition for elite sportspersons and coaches	Allowed		
Nomination of candidates and petitioning	Participating in the nomination of an election candidate, or petitioning for a referendum	Up to 2 people		N/A*
Campaigning	Campaigning in an election or referendum. Not allowed inside a private dwelling	Up to 2 people		N/A*
Observing an election or referendum	Observing at an election or referendum	Allowed		
Secretary of State's direction	Any gathering explicitly permitted under a direction made by the Secretary of State	Not Allowed	Allowed	

* "N/A" means that no exception was necessary since the activity was normally permitted under the general restrictions on gatherings for that particular Step.

=== Qualifying groups ===
Some of the exceptions allowed individuals to attend a larger-than-normal gathering provided that they did so either alone or as part of a smaller 'qualifying group', the definition depending on the Step as in the table below. During the gathering, the person could not move between qualifying groups, nor mingle with anyone outside their group.

Definition of 'qualifying group'
Place	Steps 1 and 2	Step 3
Indoors	No limit on numbers provided that all group members were from a single household, from two linked households, or (if for childcare purposes) from two linked childcare households	No limit on numbers provided that all group members were from no more than two households (linked households counting as one for this purpose). Alternatively, members could come from any number of households subject to a maximum group size of 6
Outdoors	No limit on numbers provided that all group members were from no more than two households (linked households counting as one for this purpose). Alternatively, members could come from any number of households subject to a maximum group size of 6	Group members could come from any number of households, subject to a maximum group size of 30

== Linked households ==
The concept of "linked households" (referred to in government statements as "support bubbles") was brought forward from previous regulations. Two households that were linked under these regulations could generally meet as if they were one household. First and second households could link if all the adults in both households agreed. The first household had to comprise:

- A single adult
- Any number of children and no adults
- One adult and any number of children who were under the age of 18 on 12 June 2020
- Any number of adults and a child who was under the age of one on 2 December 2020
- Any number of adults and a child with a disability that required continuous care, and who was under the age of five on 2 December 2020
- One or more persons with a disability that required continuous care, on their own or together with any number of individuals who did not have such a disability (but only one of the non-disabled individuals could be aged 18 or over on 12 June 2020).

There were no limits on the second household, which could include any number of adults and children.

A household could be linked with only one other household at a time. Linked households could be changed, if all agree, subject to a minimum 10 day waiting period counted from the last date on which any member of the newly linked households participated in a gathering that was allowed only by virtue of a previous household link.

== Linked childcare households ==
The concept of "linked childcare households" was also brought forward from previous regulations. It was separate from "linked households".

A household with at least one child aged 13 or under could link with another household who will be providing informal childcare (formal childcare, for example by a childminder, was excluded). Only one linked childcare household was permitted at any one time, and all adults in both households had to agree. Linked childcare households could be changed, if all agreed, subject to a minimum 10 day waiting period counted from the last date on which any member of the newly linked households participated in a gathering that was allowed only by virtue of a previous childcare household link.

== Organising illegal large gatherings ==
It was an offence punishable by a fine or a fixed penalty of £10,000 to hold (or be involved in the holding of) an unlawful gathering:

- indoors: of more than 30 people at a private dwelling, or in a vessel; or
- outdoors: of more than 50 people in a public place, at a private dwelling, or on a vessel.

The offence did not extend to someone whose only involvement was to attend; that was subject to a lesser penalty the amount of which depended on the size of the gathering and its location.

== Step 1 business restrictions ==
=== Business closures ===
Unless an exception applied, the following businesses had to close in Step 1 areas:

- Nightclubs, dance halls, discotheques and facilities for public dancing to music at night, sexual entertainment venues, hostess bars, shisha bars/hookah lounges.
- Public restaurants and cafes, pubs, bars, social clubs, off-licences, businesses providing food or drink prepared on the premises for immediate consumption off the premises.
- Dance and fitness studios, gyms, sports courts, swimming pools, riding arenas, indoor play areas, trampoline and inflatable parks, other indoor leisure facilities (including laser quest and escape rooms, snooker and pool halls, indoor games, recreation and entertainment venues); casinos; bingo halls; bowling alleys; amusement arcades; cinemas, theatres and concert halls; skating rinks; circuses; theme and water parks; fairgrounds and funfairs; adventure parks and activities; aquariums, zoos, and safari parks; animal attractions at farms, wildlife centres and any other place where animals were exhibited to the public as an attraction; model villages; kitchen, bathroom, tile and glazing showrooms; museums and galleries; indoor visitor attractions at attractions that were mainly outdoors; visitor attractions at film studios; certain conference centres and exhibition halls; betting shops; spas; tanning salons; hair, nail and beauty salons; barbers; massage, tattoo and piercing studios; carpet stores; vehicle showrooms (including outdoor areas); manual car washes; auction houses; markets; retail travel agents
- Libraries.

Businesses that otherwise had to close could provide a click-and-collect service, and could make deliveries in response to pre-orders.

There were a variety of specific exceptions allowing closed premises to be used for alternative purposes such as essential voluntary services, voting, education, childcare and others. Libraries and community halls were also allowed to provide digital access to public services. Community halls could in addition open for weddings, funerals, and commemorative events to celebrate the life of a person who had died.

=== Businesses allowed to remain open ===
The following businesses were allowed to remain open:

- Food retailers, including food markets, supermarkets and convenience stores; off licences and licensed shops selling alcohol; newsagents; pharmacies and chemists; animal rescue centres and boarding facilities; building merchants and suppliers of products and tools used in building work and repairs; petrol stations; vehicle repair and MOT services; bicycle shops; taxi or vehicle hire businesses; banks; building societies; cash points; currency exchanges; post offices; funeral directors; laundrettes and dry cleaners; medical and health services; vets and pet shops; agricultural supplies shops; offices; storage and distribution facilities; some drop off/collection points; car parks; public toilets; garden centres; automatic car washes; mobility and disability shops; livestock markets; livestock and agricultural equipment auctions.

Market stalls that sold the goods of any retailer permitted to remain open were also allowed.

=== Restrictions on the service of food and drink ===
Businesses providing food and drink for consumption on the premises had to close, but such businesses could still provide takeaway food and drink (except alcohol) or make deliveries (which could include alcohol).

Other exceptions included:

- Private and public transport services (alcohol allowed only for airline passengers)
- Care providers
- Seating areas at motorway service stations
- Hotel room service

=== Closure of holiday accommodation ===
All types of holiday accommodation had to close, unless an exception applied. Exceptions included work, self-isolation, moving house, person unable to return home, medical appointment, and attending a funeral.

== Step 2 business restrictions ==
Step 2 business restrictions were the same as Step 1, apart from the following relaxations:

=== Business closures ===
The following indoor facilities could open in Step 2: dance and fitness studio; gyms; sports courts; swimming pools; riding arenas; indoor play areas; trampoline and inflatable parks; drive-in cinemas, theatres and circuses; outdoor skating rinks; betting shops; spas; tanning salons; hair, nail and beauty salons; barbers; massage, tattoo and piercing studios; carpet stores; vehicle showrooms; car washes; auction houses; markets; retail travel agents; libraries.

Also, outdoor-only attractions at these places could open: theme and water parks; fairgrounds and funfairs; adventure parks and activities; aquariums, zoos, and safari parks; animal attractions at farms, wildlife centres and any other place where animals were exhibited to the public as an attraction; gardens; heritage sites; museums and galleries; sculpture parks; landmarks; model villages; and visitor attractions at film studios.

All businesses providing food or drink prepared on the premises for immediate consumption off the premises could open (in Step 1 they could open only if a supermarket, convenience store, newsagent, pharmacist/chemist or a petrol station).

=== Restrictions on the service of food and drink ===
Businesses providing food and drink for consumption on the premises could do so only in an outdoor area. Indoor areas had to remain closed, apart from toilets, baby changing rooms and breastfeeding rooms. All food and drink had to be consumed while the customer remained seated outdoors, although customers were allowed to go inside to order or to pay (although alcohol had to be ordered as well as served and consumed while the customer was seated outside).

=== Closure of holiday accommodation ===
Some holiday accommodation could open in Step 2, specifically:

- accommodation in separate and entirely self-contained premises that were occupied by members of a single household or two linked households, and
- campsites and caravan parks, so long as the only shared facilities were the reception area, washing and clothes laundering, breastfeeding and baby changing, toilets, water, waste disposal, and facilities provided by businesses that were permitted to open.

== Step 3 business restrictions ==
=== Business closures ===
All businesses, including holiday accommodation, were allowed to re-open in Step 3, apart from the following: nightclubs, dance halls, discotheques and facilities for public dancing to music at night, sexual entertainment venues, hostess bars, shisha bars/hookah lounges.

=== Restrictions on the service of food and drink ===
Special rules applied to restaurants, cafes, pubs, bars, social clubs and casinos. Where food and drink were sold for consumption on the premises, the business had to take reasonable steps to ensure that all customers remained seated while consuming. There was an additional restriction if the venue sold alcohol: customers could not place or collect orders at the bar or serving area; all orders had to be placed and served to seated customers.

There were a variety of exceptions for motorway service areas, ports, airports and international rail terminals. The rules regarding alcohol were relaxed at cinemas, theatres, concert halls and sportsgrounds where food and drink were ordered by ticket-holders.

== Collection of contact details on entry to venues ==
Since September 2020, establishments where people came into prolonged contact with those from other households had been required to collect and keep for 21 days records of the names and phone numbers of staff, customers, and visitors. These regulations required everyone entering as a member of a group to provide their name and contact details; previously, it had been sufficient for the group's leader to provide their own name and details.

== Restrictions on leaving the United Kingdom ==
The regulations in this section were in force between 29 March and 16 May 2021 only.

For the first time, the regulations explicitly attempted to prevent individuals from leaving the United Kingdom, and these applied throughout England regardless of Step area. Exceptions applied to individuals who had 'reasonable excuse' to do so, or to whom a specific exemption applied. Unless exempt or travelling with reasonable excuse, no person was allowed to

- leave England to travel to a destination outside the UK, or
- travel to or be present at an embarkation point (such as an international terminal) in order to leave the UK.

The wording of the first bullet point prevented an individual in England from, say, driving to Scotland and attempting to leave the UK from there. The wording of the second applied to anyone who was en route to an international terminal, as well as to anyone already there.

=== Reasonable excuses ===
There was no exhaustive definition of 'reasonable excuse' in the regulations, but the following were specifically permitted.

No.	Allowable excuse	Ref
1	Travelling to a final destination within the Common Travel Area (anywhere within the United Kingdom, Ireland, the Isle of Man, and the Channel Islands). This did not allow onward travel to a destination outside that area.	
2	For work purposes, where the work could not be done in the UK	
3	To provide voluntary or charitable services, where that could not be done in the UK	
4	To attend an educational institution outside the UK, where pre-enrolled; to satisfy the study requirements of a UK educational institution; or for someone already studying in the UK, to return home once before 29 April 2021 for a vacation	
5	Elite sportspeople and coaches: for training or competition	
6	To fulfil a legal obligation or participate in legal proceedings	
7	In connection with the purchase, sale, letting or rental of residential property	
8	To seek medical assistance, attend a clinical appointment, avoid injury, illness or risk or harm, attend an expectant mother, or visit a person in hospital, hospice or care home	
9	To provide emergency assistance, to provide care and assistance to a vulnerable person, to attend a funeral, or to visit a household member, close family member or friend you believe to be dying	
10	To attend your own wedding or civil partnership ceremony or that of a close family member. One or both of the couple had to live outside the UK	
11	Child access arrangements	
12	To vote in an election or referendum, where that cannot be done from within the UK	
13	Where the person is a non-UK resident and is in the country on a temporary basis	
14	Where the person leaving is a child of someone who has reasonable excuse to leave, and no alternative arrangements for the child's care could reasonably be made	

=== Exempt individuals ===
There was a long list of exemptions from the restrictions on leaving the UK, including certain road hauliers, seamen, aircraft crew, government contractors, technical specialists, channel tunnel workers, diplomats, consular officials, foreign government officials, representatives of international organisations, transit passengers, and persons being removed from the country.

=== Travel declaration form ===
Apart from children and exempt individuals, anyone travelling within England on their way to leaving the United Kingdom had to carry with them a completed travel declaration form. On the form, the traveller was required to give a variety of personal details, to state the reason for leaving the UK, and to certify that the information provided was true. Anyone failing to do so who was already at an embarkation point could be required to leave without departing from the UK. Failure to comply could result in a £5000 penalty.

== Enforcement ==
Breaches of the regulations were offences and could be prosecuted or dealt with by fixed penalty notices with penalties ranging between £100 and £10,000.

== Reviews and revocation ==
The Secretary of State had to review the need for the restrictions every 35 days. The regulations were originally set to expire on 30 June 2021, later changed to the end of 18 July 2021.

The regulations were ultimately repealed by the Health Protection (Coronavirus, Restrictions) (Steps etc.) (England) (Revocation and Amendment) Regulations 2021 with effect from 11.55pm on 18 July 2021.

== Summary of main changes, by date ==
This chronological table lists the main changes to the Steps regulations.

SI	In effect	Main changes	Ref
2021/364	29 March	Initial enactment	
2021/455	12 April	Moved all of England to Step 2 restrictions	
2021/585	17 May	Moved all of England to Step 3 restrictions, repealed restrictions on travelling to leave the UK	
2021/705	20 June	Moved expiry date on to 18 July 2021. Removed the limit on numbers attending weddings (incl civil partnerships), receptions, funerals, and commemorative events following a person's death. Also, allowed those events to take place anywhere other than indoors in a private dwelling	
2021/848	18 July	Regulations revoked	

== Bibliography ==
- "SI 364". Legislation.gov.uk. 29 March 2021. The Health Protection (Coronavirus, Restrictions) (Steps) (England) Regulations 2021.
- "SI 455". Legislation.gov.uk. 12 April 2021. The Health Protection (Coronavirus, Restrictions) (Steps and Local Authority Enforcement Powers) (England) (Amendment) Regulations 2021.
- "SI 585". Legislation.gov.uk. 17 May 2021. The Health Protection (Coronavirus, Restrictions) (Steps and Other Provisions) (England) (Amendment) Regulations 2021.
- "SI 705". Legislation.gov.uk. 20 June 2021. The Health Protection (Coronavirus, Restrictions) (Steps and Other Provisions) (England) (Amendment)(No. 2) Regulations 2021.
- "SI 848". legislation.gov.uk. 18 July 2021. The Health Protection (Coronavirus, Restrictions) (Steps etc.) (England) (Revocation and Amendment) Regulations 2021.
