= What-not =

Open shelf unit for display of ornaments

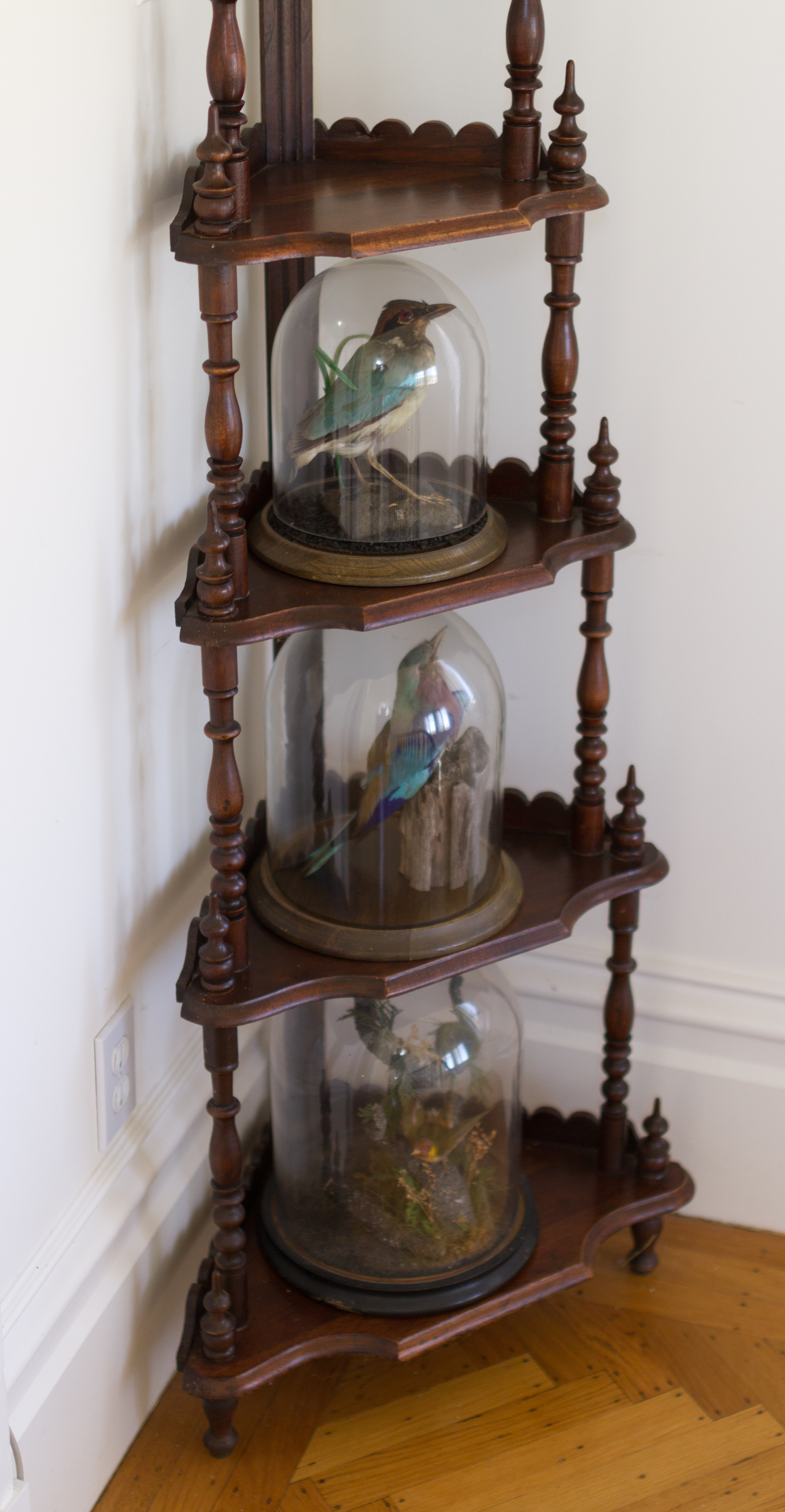
A corner what-not

A what-not or whatnot is a piece of furniture derived from the French étagère which was exceedingly popular in England in the first three-quarters of the 19th century.

== History ==
It usually consists of slender uprights or pillars, supporting a series of shelves for holding china, ornaments, trifles, or "what nots", hence the allusive name. The rise of the what-not coincided with the availability of purely decorative items which warranted display. The slender uprights functioned to provide as uninterrupted view of the objects on display as possible.

In its English form, it is a convenient piece of drawing room furniture, and was rarely valued for its aesthetic. The first recorded what-not in England was from December 1808, in a letter from Lady Sarah Spencer to her brother Robert which mentions laying a new carpet which necessitated "old chairs, tables, what-nots, and sofas were torn up by the roots".

British what-nots are typically made of mahogany or rosewood, which were fashionable woods in the late Georgian and Victorian eras. Most what-nots are square, though triangular forms were made to fit in corners. Some incorporate a drawer. American manufacturers also produced what-nots.

== See also ==
- Encoignure
