= Tier 3 =

Tier 3 may refer to:

- Tier 3 (nightclub), in New York, U.S.
- Tier 3 of the First COVID-19 tier regulations in England, the highest level
- Tier 3 of the Second COVID-19 tier regulations in England
- Tier 3 Railway lines in Australia
- Tier III, a data center standard
- Tier 3 in United States vehicle emission standards

== See also ==
- Multitier architecture
- WTA Tier III tournaments, Women's Tennis Association tennis third-level tournaments
- Three-tier system (disambiguation)
- Tier III- (Tier 3 minus), an unmanned aerial vehicle
- Tier 1 (disambiguation)
- Tier 2 (disambiguation)
- Tier 4 (disambiguation)
