= Health Protection (Coronavirus, Restrictions) (England) (No. 4) Regulations 2020 =

United Kingdom emergency legislation

- Statutory Instrument
- Parliament of the United Kingdom
- Citation: SI 2020/1200
- Introduced by: Matt Hancock, Secretary of State for Health and Social Care
- Territorial extent: England

Dates
- Made: 3 November 2020
- Laid before Parliament: 3 November 2020
- Commencement: 5 November 2020
- Revoked: 1 December 2020

Other legislation
- Made under: Public Health (Control of Disease) Act 1984
- Revoked by: Health Protection (Coronavirus, Restrictions) (All Tiers) (England) Regulations 2020

Status: Revoked

Text of the Health Protection (Coronavirus, Restrictions) (England) (No. 4) Regulations 2020 as in force today (including any amendments) within the United Kingdom, from legislation.gov.uk.

The Health Protection (Coronavirus, Restrictions) (England) (No. 4) Regulations 2020 (SI 2020/1200) is an English statutory instrument made on 3 November 2020 by the Secretary of State for Health and Social Care, Matt Hancock, in response to the COVID-19 pandemic.

The three sets of First COVID-19 tier regulations which had been in place since 14 October 2020 had failed to reduce the levels of COVID-19 in England, and on 5 November they were revoked and replaced with these more rigorous "second lockdown" regulations.

Under the regulations, no-one was allowed to leave their own home without "reasonable excuse". Most social gatherings (meetings) of two or more people were prohibited unless an exception applied, but outdoor meetings of no more than two people were allowed in a public space. Most shops and many public-facing businesses were required to close, unless on an approved list.

The regulations were initially to remain in effect between 5 November and 2 December 2020 inclusive, but they were revoked and replaced one day early by the Health Protection (Coronavirus, Restrictions) (All Tiers) (England) Regulations 2020, with those regulations coming into effect at 00:00 on 2 December.

== Context and earlier regulations ==
In response to the developing COVID-19 pandemic the UK government had issued advice to English schools on 12 March 2020 that they should cancel trips abroad, and on 16 March that the public should avoid non-essential travel, crowded places, and visits to care homes. This was followed by the closure of schools, colleges and nurseries from 21 March.

On 21 March the government used emergency powers to make business closure regulations, enforcing the closure in England of businesses selling food and drink for consumption on the premises, as well as a range of other businesses such as nightclubs and indoor leisure centres where a high risk of infection could be expected. Five days later the restrictions were made more extensive. On 26 March 2020 the even more stringent Lockdown Regulations came into force. These became the principal delegated English legislation restricting freedom of movement, gatherings, and business closures, and were progressively relaxed on 22 April 13 May, 1 June, and 13/15 June. The No. 2 regulations of 4 July 2020 further relaxed the rules throughout most of England, apart from City of Leicester and the surrounding area which became the subject of the first of a series of local regulations.

Between July and September 2020, more extensive and increasingly rigorous ad hoc local regulations were introduced, which in many areas proved unsuccessful in controlling spread of the virus. All of these local regulations were repealed on 14 October 2020, and were replaced by the First COVID-19 tier regulations.

On 31 October 2020, the Prime Minister Boris Johnson announced that England would go into a second lockdown from 5 November, with 'non-essential shops, leisure and entertainment venues' being required to close, and individuals prohibited from leaving home 'without reasonable excuse'. In contrast with the first lockdown, schools and universities would be allowed to remain open, and clinically vulnerable people would not have to resume shielding. Keir Starmer stated in parliament that the opposition would support the regulations, but regretted that the government had not acted earlier as had been recommended by the Government’s Scientific Advisory Group on Emergencies.

The First COVID-19 tier regulations were duly revoked on 5 November 2020 and replaced with these more rigorous second lockdown regulations SI 2020/1200.

== Legal basis ==
SI 2020/1200 was introduced by way of a Statutory Instrument made by the Secretary of State for Health and Social Care, Matt Hancock, using emergency powers available to him under the Public Health (Control of Disease) Act 1984. The regulations themselves state the legal basis for using such powers, namely "the serious and imminent threat to public health which is posed by the incidence and spread of severe acute respiratory syndrome coronavirus 2 (SARS-CoV-2) in England".

The regulations were laid before parliament on 3 November 2020. The Secretary of State again used section 45R of the Public Health (Control of Disease) Act 1984 to enact the regulations on government authority, subject to retrospective approval by resolution of each House of Parliament within twenty-eight days. In the regulations themselves he stated that "by reason of urgency, it is necessary to make this instrument" without having first placed a draft before parliament for prior approval. On 4 November, the House of Commons was given the opportunity to vote on the regulations (but not to amend them), a vote that the government won by 516 votes to 38.

== Commencement, scope and expiry ==
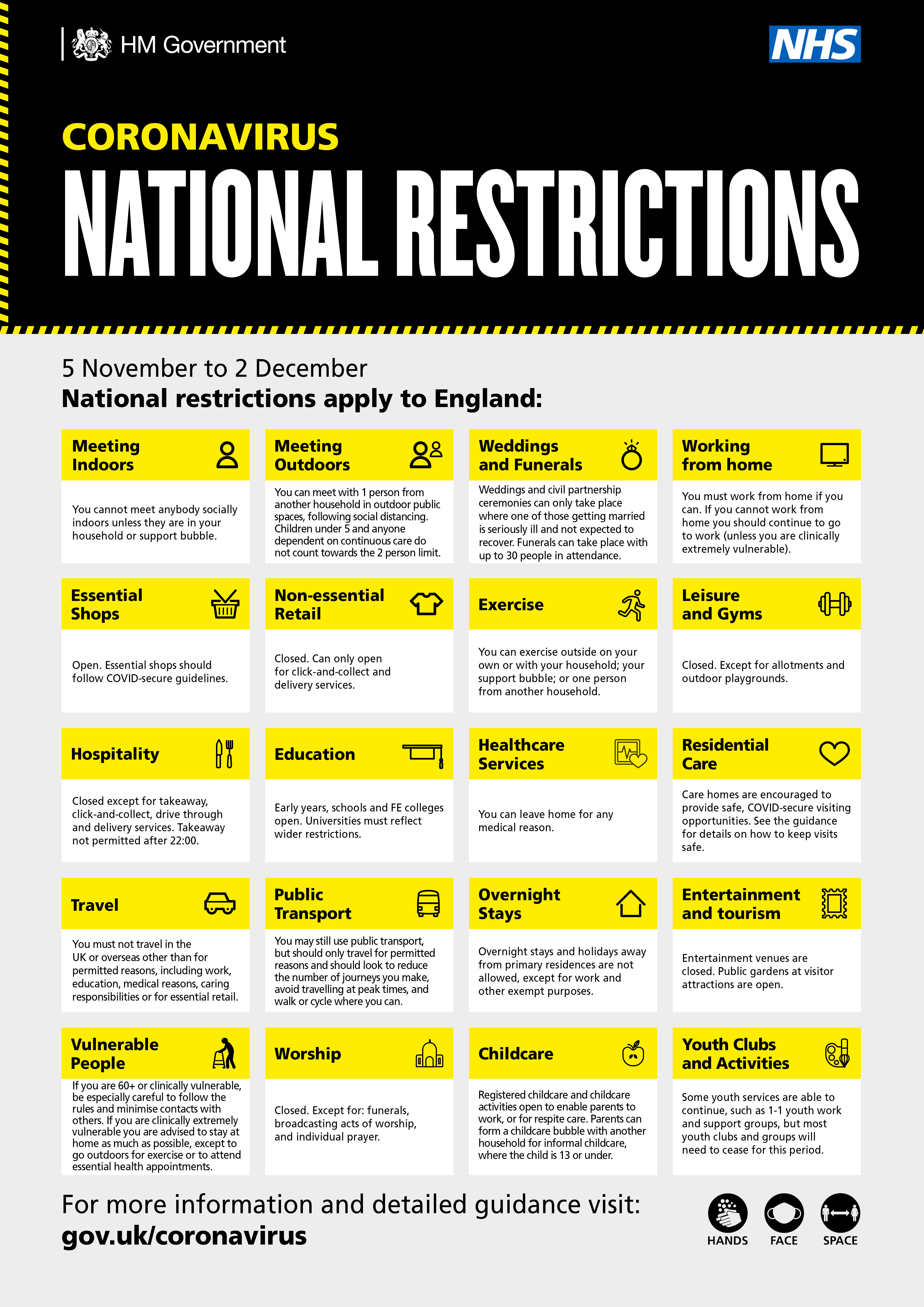
Government poster summarising the restrictions

The regulations (which applied in England only) came into effect on 5 November 2020. They were set expire automatically at the end of the day of 2 December 2020.

== Restrictions on leaving home ==
As a general rule, no-one was allowed to leave or be outside their own home (which included any associated garden or yard) without "reasonable excuse". No exhaustive definition of "reasonable excuse" was provided, though it included any of the following exceptions:

=== Reasonable excuses for leaving home ===
Reasonable excuses for leaving home
Exception	Name	Details	Ref
1	Necessary for certain purposes	See below	
2	Work, voluntary services, education, training etc	To provide voluntary or charitable services that cannot be done from home; to access charitable services; for education or training; to provide care or assistance to a vulnerable person (anyone over 70, pregnant, or with a serious health condition); to provide emergency assistance; to fulfil a legal obligation; to access critical public services	
3	Elite athletes	For the purposes of training or competition	
4	Medical need etc	To seek medical assistance, to get a test, to be vaccinated, or to access health, medical, or mental health services	
5	Support and respite	To attend a permitted support group meeting; respite-related reasons	
6	Death bed visit	To visit a household member, close family member, or friend you believe to be dying	
7	Funerals etc	To attend a funeral or an event commemorating a person's life; or certain visits to a burial ground or garden of remembrance	
8	Marriages and civil partnerships	To attend a licensed wedding where one of the participants is seriously ill and is not expected to recover	
9	Children	To take a child to school; childcare access arrangements; children in care; prospective adopters; informal childcare by linked childcare household; registered childcare or supervised activities for children but only where necessary to enable a parent to work, search for work or undertake training or education	
10	Animal welfare	To care for or exercise a pet; to attend a vet	
11	Returning home	Returning home from a holiday that was started before the regulations came into force	
12	Prison visits	Visits by a close family member or friend	
13	Other visits	To visit a household member, close family member or friend in hospital, hospice or care home; or to accompany them to a medical appointment	

=== Exception 1: leaving home necessary for certain purposes ===
This exception covered a variety of situations:

Exception 1 situations
Exception	Details
1a	Where reasonably necessary to leave home to buy goods or services for oneself, a household member, a vulnerable person (anyone over 70, pregnant, or with a serious health condition) or someone in their household
1b	To obtain or deposit money
1c	To take exercise outside. This could be either alone, or with household or linked household members. Also permitted was to exercise outside in a public place with any one other person (for this purpose, children under five and up to two carers for a disabled person were not counted)
1d	To visit a public outdoor place for open air recreation. This could be either alone, or with household or linked household members. Also permitted was to exercise outside in a public place with any one other person (for this purpose, children under five and up to two carers for a disabled person were not counted)
1e	To attend a place of worship
1f	To attend an event commemorating Remembrance Sunday; or Armistice Day
1g	In connection with the purchase, sale, letting or rental of residential property
1h	To visit a linked household
1i	To collect pre-ordered food, drink, or other goods, or visit a food or drink service business to obtain a takeaway
1j	To visit a waste disposal or recycling centre

== Restrictions on gatherings ==
Indoor gatherings of two or more people were entirely prohibited unless an exception applied. This also applied to gatherings in a private dwelling.

Most outdoor gatherings of two or more were also prohibited unless an exception applied, but gatherings of two people in a public outdoor place were permitted. Children under the age of five and up to two carers for a person with a disability were not counted for this purpose.

=== Exceptions to the general prohibition against gatherings ===
Allowable gatherings
Exception	Name	Details	Ref
1	Same or linked households	All people in the gathering were members of the same or a linked household. No limit on numbers	
2	Gatherings necessary for certain purposes	Work or voluntary or charitable services; education or training; emergency assistance; to avoid injury or illness or escape a risk of harm; providing care or assistance to a vulnerable person (anyone over 70, pregnant, or with a serious health condition); facilitating a house move	
3	Legal obligations and proceedings	To fulfil a legal obligation or to participate in legal proceedings	
4	Criminal justice accommodation	Where the gathering took place in criminal justice accommodation	
5	Support groups	Certain organised support groups of no more than 15 people, not in a private dwelling. Children under five were not included in the count. It had to be reasonably necessary for the members of the support group to be physically present	
6	Respite care	Respite-related gatherings	
7	Births, and visiting persons receiving treatment etc	Attending a person giving birth; visiting a household member, close family member or friend in hospital, hospice or care home; or accompanying them to a medical appointment	
8	Marriages and civil partnerships	A licensed wedding where one of the participants was seriously ill and was not expected to recover, maximum attendance 6 people including the celebrant and the couple. No other weddings were allowed	
9	Visiting a dying person	A gathering to visit a household member, close family member, or friend you believed to be dying	
10	Funerals	A funeral with no more than 30 people in attendance, following a risk assessment. Not permitted at a private dwelling	
11	Commemorative event following a person's death	An event such as the scattering of ashes with no more than 15 people in attendance, following a risk assessment. Not permitted at a private dwelling	
12	Elite sports	Gatherings necessary for elite training or competition	
13	Children	Childcare access arrangements; children in care; prospective adopters; informal childcare by linked childcare household; registered childcare or supervised activities for children (but only where necessary to enable a parent to work, search for work or undertake training or education)	
14	Remembrance Sunday and Armistice Day	Organised outdoor Remembrance Sunday (or Armistice Day) gatherings, after a risk assessment. Not permitted at a private dwelling. Also, special arrangements for an Armistice Day service in Westminster Abbey on 11 November 2020	

== Linked households ==
A household containing exactly one adult (no more) and any number of children could form a permanent link with one other household of any size (such linked households were referred to in government statements as "support bubbles"). Households which were already linked under earlier regulations could not link with any other household.

== Linked childcare households ==
A household with at least one child aged 13 or under could link with another household providing informal childcare. In order to link, all adults in both households had to agree. Each household was allowed a single linked childcare household only, which could not be changed; multiple links were not permitted.

== Business closures and restrictions ==
Business closures and restrictions
	Must close	Ref	Exceptions	Ref
Hospitality businesses	Restaurants, cafes, bars, social clubs, pubs (including outside areas made available to or used by customers)		Motorway service stations; air and sea ports; international rail terminal; on public transport Between 5 am and 10 pm: providing takeaway food and drink. Alcohol sales were allowed only in response to pre-booked orders; the customer collecting could not enter the premises. Drive-through food, drink and alcohol sales were permitted. Between 10 pm and 5 am: providing takeaway food and drink in response to pre-booked orders. The customer collecting could not enter the premises. Drive-through food and drink sales were permitted. No alcohol could be sold during these times.	
Other businesses	Indoor: dance studios, fitness studios, gyms, sports courts, swimming pools, bowling alleys, amusement arcades, playgrounds, soft play areas, other indoor leisure centres, recreation and entertainment venues, indoor attractions at visitor attractions Outdoor: markets, sports centres or amenities, water sports, stables, shooting and archery venues, golf courses, driving ranges, outdoor gyms, swimming pools, water parks and aquaparks Not restricted to indoor or outdoor: cinemas, theatres, nightclubs, discos and the like, bingo halls, concert halls, museums and galleries, casinos, betting shops, adult gaming centres, spas, nail and beauty salons, hair salons, barbers, tanning salons, massage parlours, sexual entertainment venues, hostess bars, tattoo and piercing parlours, skating rinks, car showrooms, car washes, auction houses, model villages, visitor attractions at film studios, animal-related attractions, conference centres and exhibition halls, circuses, funfairs, fairgrounds, theme parks		Outdoor food markets; outdoor livestock markets; outdoor markets with stalls of businesses that were allowed to open The outdoor parts of visitor attractions such as botanical or other gardens, heritage sites and landmarks were not required by the regulations to close	
Unspecified shops	All retail other shops, apart from those permitted to remain open (see list below)		Delivery and collection in response to pre-booked orders (click and collect). The customer collecting could not enter the premises	
Libraries	Libraries		Libraries could open for support groups, childcare, education and training, voluntary or public services	
Holiday accommodation	All types of holiday accommodation		Various exceptions including work, use while moving house, children's education etc	
Places of worship	All places of worship		Funerals, commemorative events following a death, individual prayer, voluntary services, childcare and the like, as well as broadcast of acts of worship. Communal worship was banned	
Community centres and halls	Community centres and halls		Essential voluntary services, education and training, support groups, childcare and supervised activities	
Crematoria and burial grounds	Crematoria and burial grounds		Burials, commemorative events following a death, visitor paying respects to a member of their household, a family member or a friend	
Businesses that could remain open	Food retailers, including food markets, supermarkets, convenience stores and corner shops, off licences, pharmacies and chemists, newsagents, hardware stores, building merchants, petrol stations, car repair and MOT services, bicycle shops, taxi or vehicle hire businesses, banks, building societies, cash points, currency exchange offices, post offices, funeral directors, laundrettes and dry cleaners, medical, health and mental health services, vets, pet shops, agricultural supplies, storage and distribution facilities, delivery drop off or collection points, car parks, public toilets, garden centres From 21 November 2020: businesses selling natural Christmas trees			

== Enforcement ==
Breaches of the regulations were offences and could be prosecuted or dealt with by fixed penalty notices with penalties ranging up to £10,000 for repeated violations.

== Analysis ==
In an article originally published on 28 November 2020, cabinet minister Michael Gove, who was involved in introducing the second lockdown, defended the decision as unavoidable and stated that, without it, the National Health Service would have been overwhelmed.

In a paper of 18 November 2020, the British Medical Association (BMA) criticised the government for having no coherent plan for keeping infection rates down after the end of the first lockdown in June. The BMA recommended that before easing the current restrictions, the government should implement an effective testing and contact tracing system, and should set out a national prevention strategy to include reduced social contact, COVID-secure public spaces, consistent mask use, continued encouragement to work from home, enforcement mechanisms, and an NHS contact-tracing app. They further argued for an effective vaccination programme, and for a revised tiered system of local lockdowns in case of further infection surges, with tighter restrictions on social mixing and travel.

== Bibliography ==
- "SI 350". Legislation.gov.uk. 26 March 2020. The Health Protection (Coronavirus, Restrictions) (England) Regulations 2020.
- "SI 684". Legislation.gov.uk. 4 July 2020. The Health Protection (Coronavirus, Restrictions) (England) (No. 2) Regulations 2020.
- "SI 685". Legislation.gov.uk. 4 July 2020. The Health Protection (Coronavirus, Restrictions) (Leicester) Regulations 2020.
- "SI 1200". Legislation.gov.uk. 5 November 2020. The Health Protection (Coronavirus, Restrictions) (England) (No. 4) Regulations 2020.
- "SI 1242". Legislation.gov.uk. 10 November 2020. The Health Protection (Coronavirus, Restrictions) (England) (No. 4) (Amendment) Regulations 2020.
- "SI 1326". Legislation.gov.uk. 21 November 2020. The Health Protection (Coronavirus, Restrictions) (England) (No. 4) (Amendment) (No. 2) Regulations 2020.
