= Northern Tier =

Northern Tier may refer to:

- Northern Tier (Pennsylvania), five northern counties in Pennsylvania
- Northern Tier (United States), the northernmost confine of the lower 48 United States
- Northern Tier (Scouting), high adventure bases run by Scouting America
- Northern Tier Energy, an American business partnership created in 2010
- Northern Tier, a Cold War term from 1955–1979 for the four Middle Eastern members of the Baghdad Pact, also known as the Central Treaty Organization: Turkey, Iraq, Iran and Pakistan.
