= Tier 4 =

Tier 4 or Tier four may refer to:

- Tier 4 COVID restrictions in England under The Health Protection (Coronavirus, Restrictions) (All Tiers) (England) Regulations 2020, the highest level
- Level 4 COVID restrictions, in COVID-19 pandemic in Scotland
- Tier-4 COVID restrictions, in COVID-19 pandemic in Wales
- Tier IV, a data center standard
- Tier 4 in United States vehicle emission standards

== See also ==
- Multitier architecture
- WTA Tier IV tournaments, Women's Tennis Association tennis second-level tournaments
- Tier 1 (disambiguation)
- Tier 2 (disambiguation)
- Tier 3 (disambiguation)
- Tirefour Castle, in Scotland
