= Cake stand =

Elevated plate for serving cake

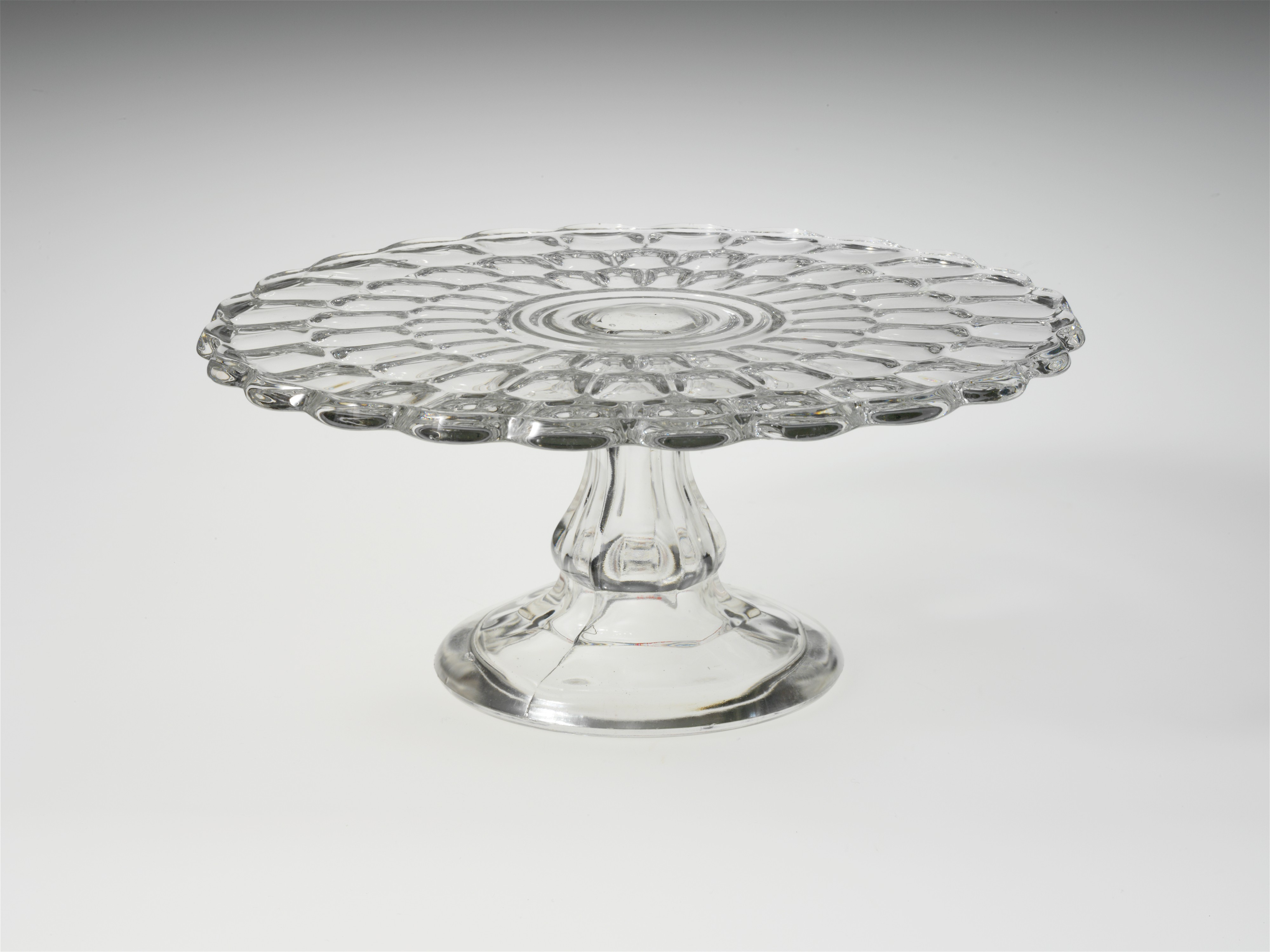
A pressed glass cake stand from the mid-1800s.

A cake stand is a type of tableware used for serving cake and other pastries, or a type of kitchen equipment used for holding cakes while they are decorated. The most common form is a plate on a pedestal; sometimes there are multiple plates in a tower. While most commonly made of ceramic, but may also be made of metal, glass, ceramic, and so on.

== Design ==
There are different functional and artistic designs for cake stands. There are many patents on the design of cake stands.

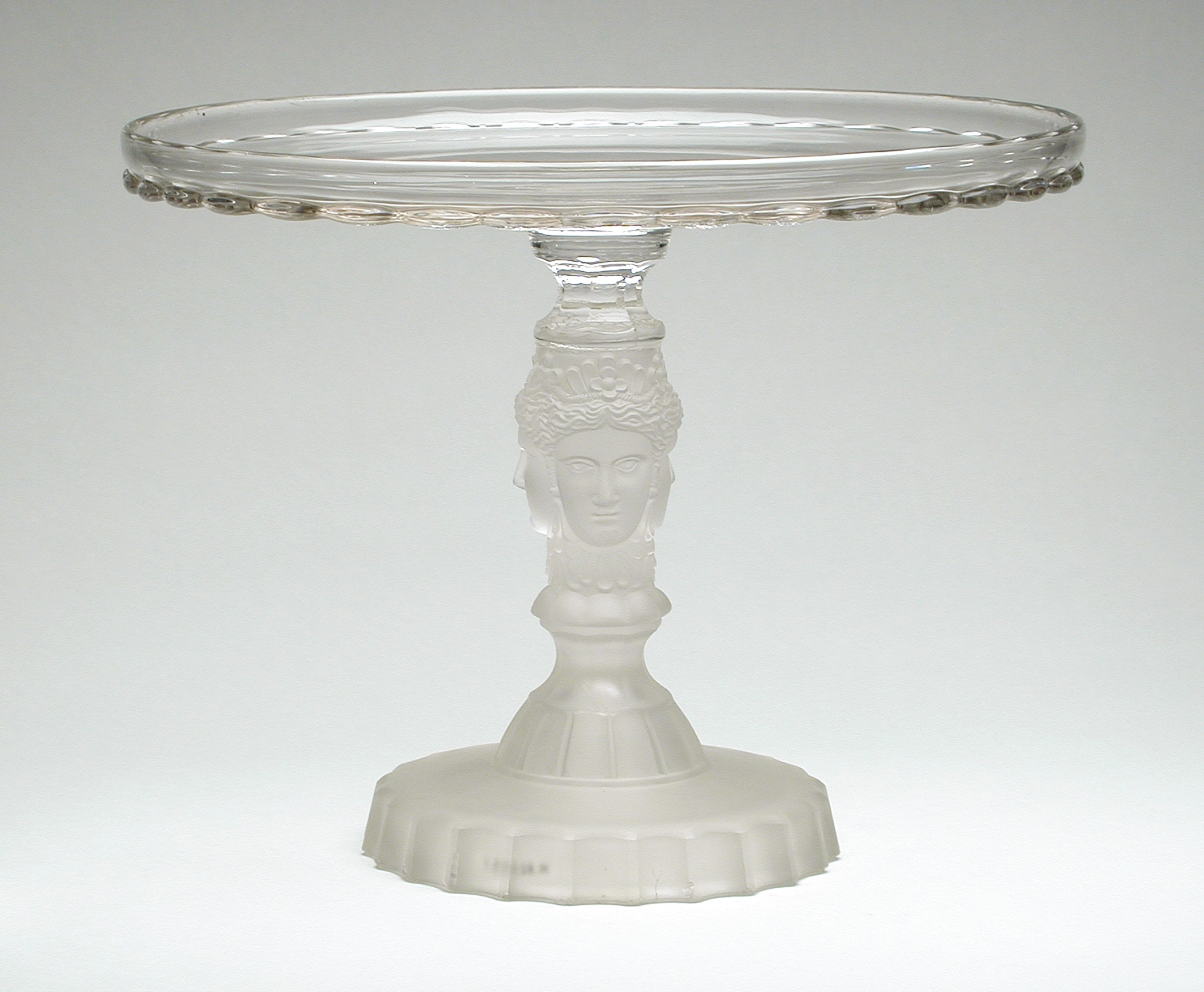
Pressed glass cake stand from the mid-19th century.

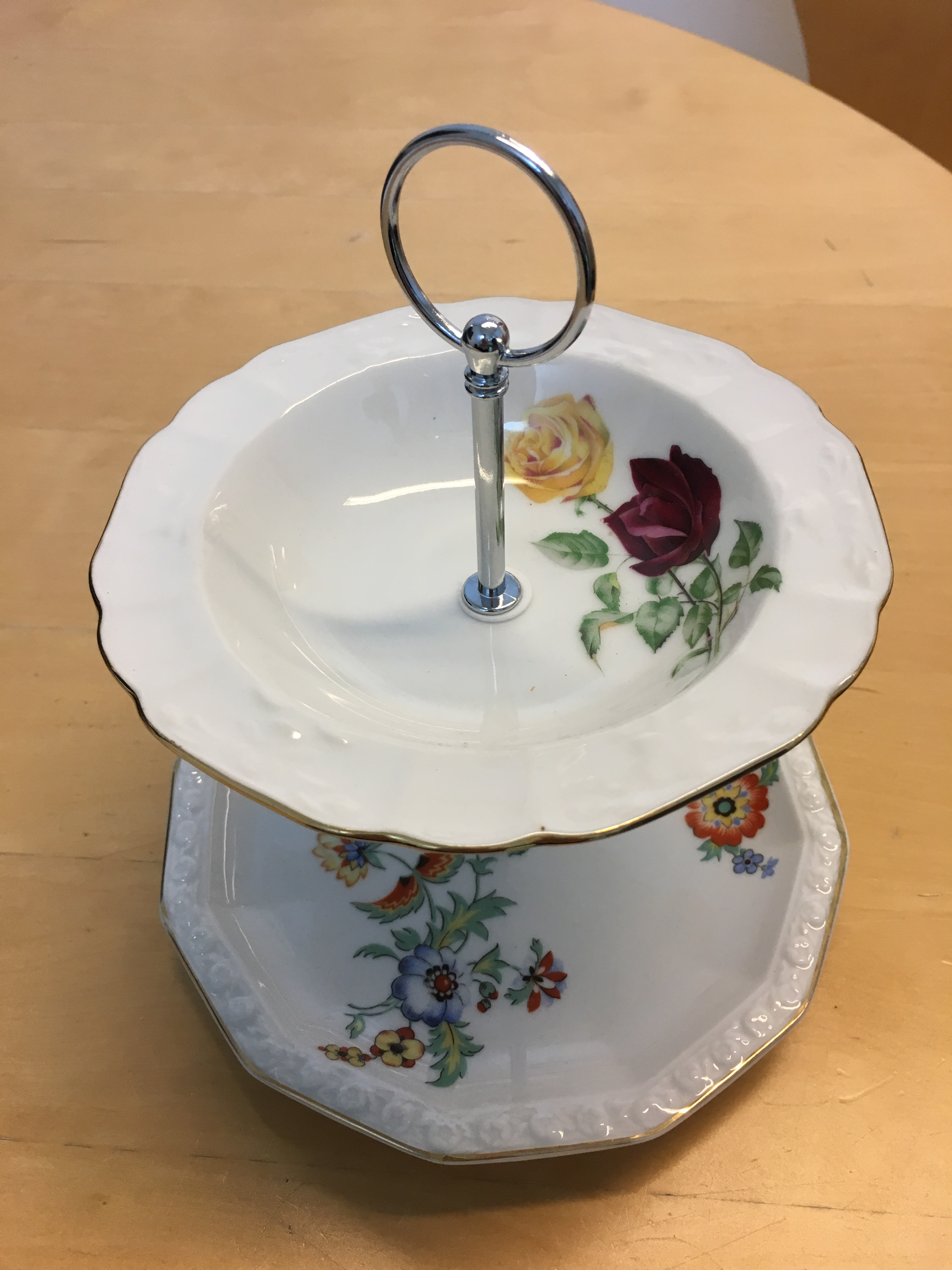
An example of a two-tiered ceramic cake stand.

=== Structure ===
A cake stand is a multi-layered or single-layered stool-like hosting object. A multi-tiered cake stand is also known as an étagère, with each layer known as a tier.

Usually with a supporting spin in the middle, parallel plates, and plates arranged by size with the largest plate at the bottom. The plates are usually circular. The plates are connected to the posts with a mechanical fastener. The shape and size of the posts vary based on design. For wedding cake stands, the design is usually multi-layered and tall. The top layer is the smallest, usually with a decoration on the top of the cake stand. The plates may be supported by one centred post sharing the same core, or there could be multiple posts with dislocated centre structure to provide the visual multi-structured effect. The multiple-tier centre stand includes a centre support that has multiple tiers, and multiple plates and posts which are connected together by mechanical fastener. In some designs the lower deck of the cake stand, at least two of the plates, can be disassembled into two pieces.

=== Components ===
A cake stand is typified by the composing of

- a plurality of plates
- a plurality of posts
- mechanical fastener
- a base or supporting plate
- (for decorating cake stand) movable dolly

The design of cake stand has evolved with the process of cake making. The disassemblable cake stand can be taken apart for storage or transport.

=== Materials ===
Cake stands can be made from a wide variety of materials, but is most commonly made of plastic and metal. Wood, glass and resin are also used commonly in cake stands.

== Variants ==
There are two types of cake stands, one is for displaying a finished cake, the other is for decorating a cake.

Displaying cake stand:

The displaying cake stand raises the cake or pastry to make it more visually appealing. The cake stand can serve as a centerpiece. The cake stand also provides more table space for dinnerware by elevating the cake into a higher dimension.

Decorator cake stand:

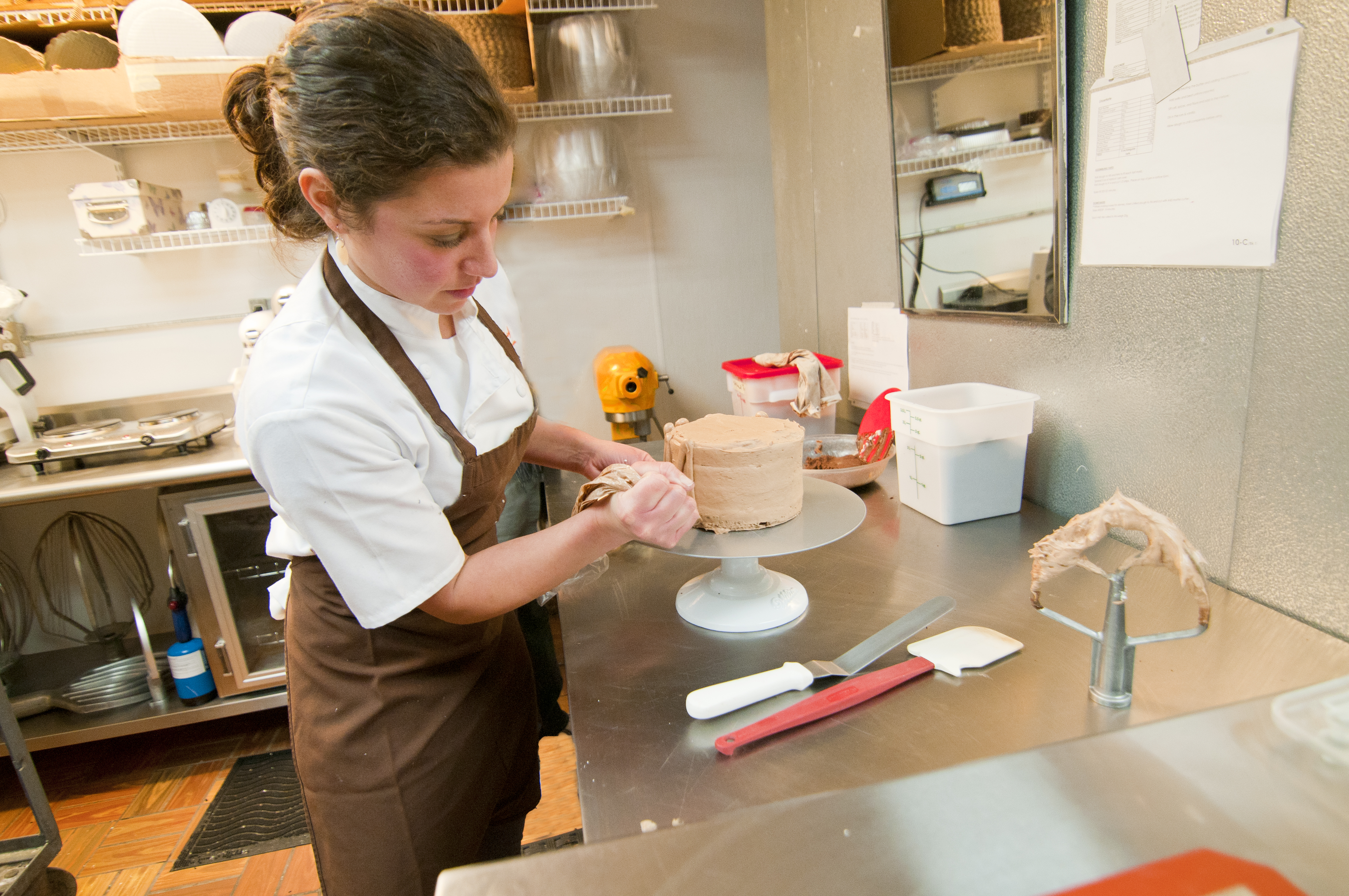
Decorator cake stand

The decorator cake stand aids in the process of cake decoration. It is usually composed of the work surface and a turnable dolly. A cake decorator rotates the plate while adding icing or other decoration to the cake.

== Functions and usage ==
The two types of cake stands have different functions. The displaying cake stand for the finished product of cake or other pastries whilst the decorator cake stand is the tool to aid working in the process of making cake.

Displaying cake stand

Tall cake stand

One type of displaying cake stand is a tall tiered cake stand. The tall cake stand is primarily used at large events with many people. Tall cake stands of different heights and shapes add drama and interest in the visual presentation of food. Food displayed on the tall cake stands contains not only cakes but also small finger food and other small pasties usually in strong contrasting colour to add interest in the presentation of food.

Covered cake stand:

The covered cake stand has a cover for the preservation of food.

Decorator cake stand

The function of the decorator cake stand is for the aiding of the decoration of cake. The decoration cake stand enables decorator to access all surfaces of the cake or other products being worked upon at a single work position.

== Design and function of wedding cake stands ==
Wedding cake stands is a signature displaying cake stand. Cake stand is almost like an essential object in weddings. The celebrations of weddings are special and momentous. The speciality of the event is marked by music, dancing, floral arrangements table decorations and food and drink. Amongst the table decorations, the wedding cake is what stands out the most. The wedding cake not only performs the role of serving a dessert but also stands as a symbol of the event. It stands in the full view of visitors throughout the whole ceremony, prior to and during the whole event. Due to this importance, the wedding cake should not only be satisfying to eat but also it should look attractive as well. The signature design of the cake is that it should stand vertically on the tabletop to be presented as an eye-catching centrepiece. Different types of cake stands and cake supports are indispensable in separating the layers of cake and to hold it into an imposing structure. There are various materials for the cake supports like metal or plastic to add to the rigidity of the stand and forming it into a multilayer cake. What is more, it adds the vidual impact of the cake without having to make too much servings. Modular cake stands made the fast assembly of the multi-layered cake possible and made the process of transporting the cake form the bakery to the reception hall easier. The cake trays of the cake stands are mostly transparent plastic to simulate glass. The cake stand usually have legs at the bottom to support the tray on the table or on tubular plastic pillars. The wedding cake usually need prominent lighting to add to its importance. The light of a candle is ideal for the attention and decoration. However, as the fire might be controlled properly and the temperature of the flame might melt the cake frosting, what is more the wax of the candle could drop into the cake, the involvement of some of the wedding cake stands is that it has the candle holder in the form of hollow pillars to hold the candles.

== History ==
The cake stand came into use in the late Victorian times when afternoon tea came into fashion. Presenting the cake at a higher level above the table gave the cake more attention. Therefore, the cake stand usually have multiple tiers and hooped handle for the purpose of carrying. The cake stand was shortly out of fashion around the 1990s. At that time people could only find cake stand from the 1950s or from earlier times. The cake stand was originally commonly made from ceramics then gradually glass and metal (silver or aluminium or steel). The original shape of cake stands are round. In the 1930s, the design of cake stands adopted shapes of polygon like square, hexagonal or octagonal. Today, the mainstream shape of cake stands are round but there are many artistic cake stands made of various materials. The technology of the displaying of multi-tiered cakes like wedding cakes has little changes in the past 50 years. The traditional technology uses multiple wooden dowel rods and it is inserted into one layer of the tier then another layer of the cake is placed on top. When separating the adjacent layers of cakes, pillars are inserted between the two layers of cake.
