= Étagère =

Set of hanging or standing open shelves for display

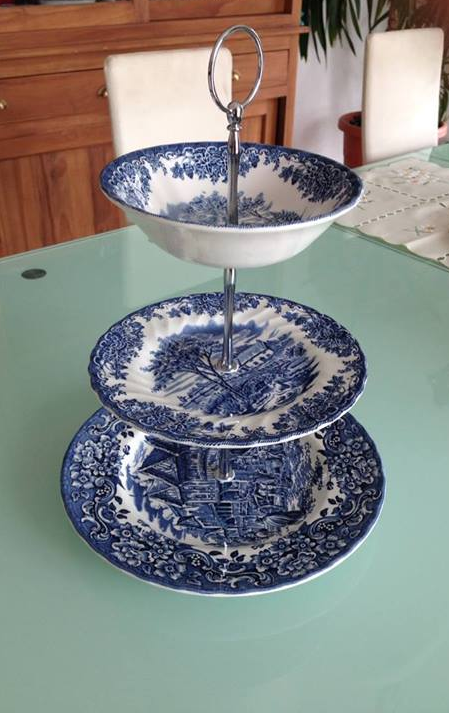
An étagère for candies

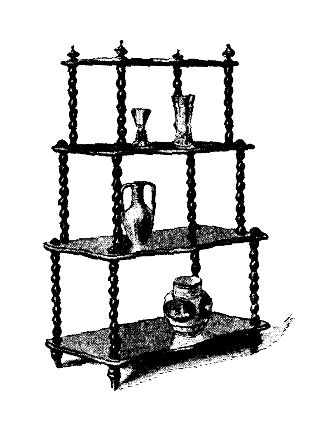
An étagère for decorative objects

An étagère (French: [etaʒɛʁ]) is a French set of hanging or standing open shelves for the display of collections of objects or ornaments.

The étagère became a popular form of furniture in the nineteenth century. Similar to the what-not, the shelves of the étagère provided extra space for the display of the accumulation of knickknacks that was typical of Victorian home decor. Each level is sometimes referred to as a tier.

The term étagère is also used for a multi-tiered cake stand.
