= Health Protection (Coronavirus, Restrictions) (All Tiers) (England) Regulations 2020 =

United Kingdom emergency legislation

- Statutory Instrument
- Parliament of the United Kingdom
- Citation: SI 2020/1374
- Introduced by: Matt Hancock, Secretary of State for Health and Social Care
- Territorial extent: England

Dates
- Made: 30 November 2020
- Laid before Parliament: 30 November 2020
- Commencement: 2 December 2020
- Revoked: 29 March 2021

Other legislation
- Repeals/revokes: Health Protection (Coronavirus, Restrictions) (England) (No. 4) Regulations 2020
- Made under: Public Health (Control of Disease) Act 1984
- Revoked by: Health Protection (Coronavirus, Restrictions) (Steps) (England) Regulations 2021

Status: Revoked

Text of the Health Protection (Coronavirus, Restrictions) (All Tiers) (England) Regulations 2020 as in force today (including any amendments) within the United Kingdom, from legislation.gov.uk.

England alert levels by district as defined by the second tier regulations, from 6 January 2021 until their repeal on 28 March 2021 Tier 1 Tier 2 Tier 3 Tier 4

The Health Protection (Coronavirus, Restrictions) (All Tiers) (England) Regulations 2020 (SI 2020/1374) is an English emergency statutory instrument that replaced the second lockdown regulations from 2 December 2020. As initially made, it brought back the three-tier legal framework first introduced by the first COVID-19 tier regulations in England (in effect 14 October – 5 November 2020), but with changes to the restrictions within each tier. The regulations are sometimes referred as the "second tier regulations" or the "all tiers regulations".

Exceptions to the restrictions on gatherings were initially to be permitted during a 'Christmas period', defined as 23–27 December 2020. But following a continued rise in infections in London and the South East, parts of those areas were moved up to tier 3 (then the highest level) on 17 and 19 December. On 20 December, London and the tier 3 parts of the South East and the East of England were moved into a new top-level tier 4, with restrictions similar to those of the second lockdown regulations. At the same point, the 'Christmas period' was restricted to Christmas Day only for tiers 1 to 3, and was abolished entirely for tier 4.

From 6 January 2021, further amendments moved all areas of England to tier 4 in what was described by politicians and the press as a "third lockdown".

The regulations were originally stated to expire on 2 February 2021, later changed to 31 March, but in the event were replaced on 29 March by the Health Protection (Coronavirus, Restrictions) (Steps) (England) Regulations 2021.

== Context and earlier regulations ==
In response to the developing COVID-19 pandemic, the UK government issued advice to English schools on 12 March 2020 that they should cancel trips abroad, and on 16 March that the public should avoid non-essential travel, crowded places, and visits to care homes. This was followed by the closure of schools, colleges and nurseries from 21 March.

On 21 March the government used emergency powers to make business closure regulations, enforcing the closure in England of businesses selling food and drink for consumption on the premises, as well as a range of other businesses such as nightclubs and indoor leisure centres where a high risk of infection could be expected. Five days later the restrictions were made more extensive. On 26 March 2020 the even more stringent Lockdown Regulations came into force. These became the principal delegated English legislation restricting freedom of movement, gatherings, and business closures, and were progressively relaxed on 22 April, 13 May, 1 June, and 13/15 June. The No. 2 regulations of 4 July 2020 further relaxed the rules throughout most of England, apart from City of Leicester and the surrounding area which became the subject of the first of a series of local regulations. Between July and September 2020, more extensive and increasingly rigorous ad hoc local regulations were introduced, which in many areas proved unsuccessful in controlling spread of the virus.

These were followed by the first COVID-19 tier regulations (in effect 14 October – 4 November 2020), which placed each local authority area under one of three levels of restrictions. As infections increased in many areas, these were replaced by the more rigorous nationwide second lockdown regulations (in effect 5 November – 1 December 2020).

On 2 December 2020 these regulations revoked the second lockdown regulations, and reintroduced a countrywide three-tier legal framework. Later amendments introduced a fourth tier.

== Legal basis ==
The regulations were made on 30 November 2020 by the Secretary of State for Health and Social Care, Matt Hancock, using emergency powers under the Public Health (Control of Disease) Act 1984, the stated legal basis being "the serious and imminent threat to public health which is posed by the incidence and spread of severe acute respiratory syndrome coronavirus 2 (SARS-CoV-2) in England". Hancock used section 45R of the Public Health (Control of Disease) Act 1984 to enact the regulations without prior parliamentary consideration, subject to retrospective approval by resolution of each House of Parliament within twenty-eight days. The regulations entered into force on 2 December 2020.

== Return of the tiers ==
Government posters, October 2020

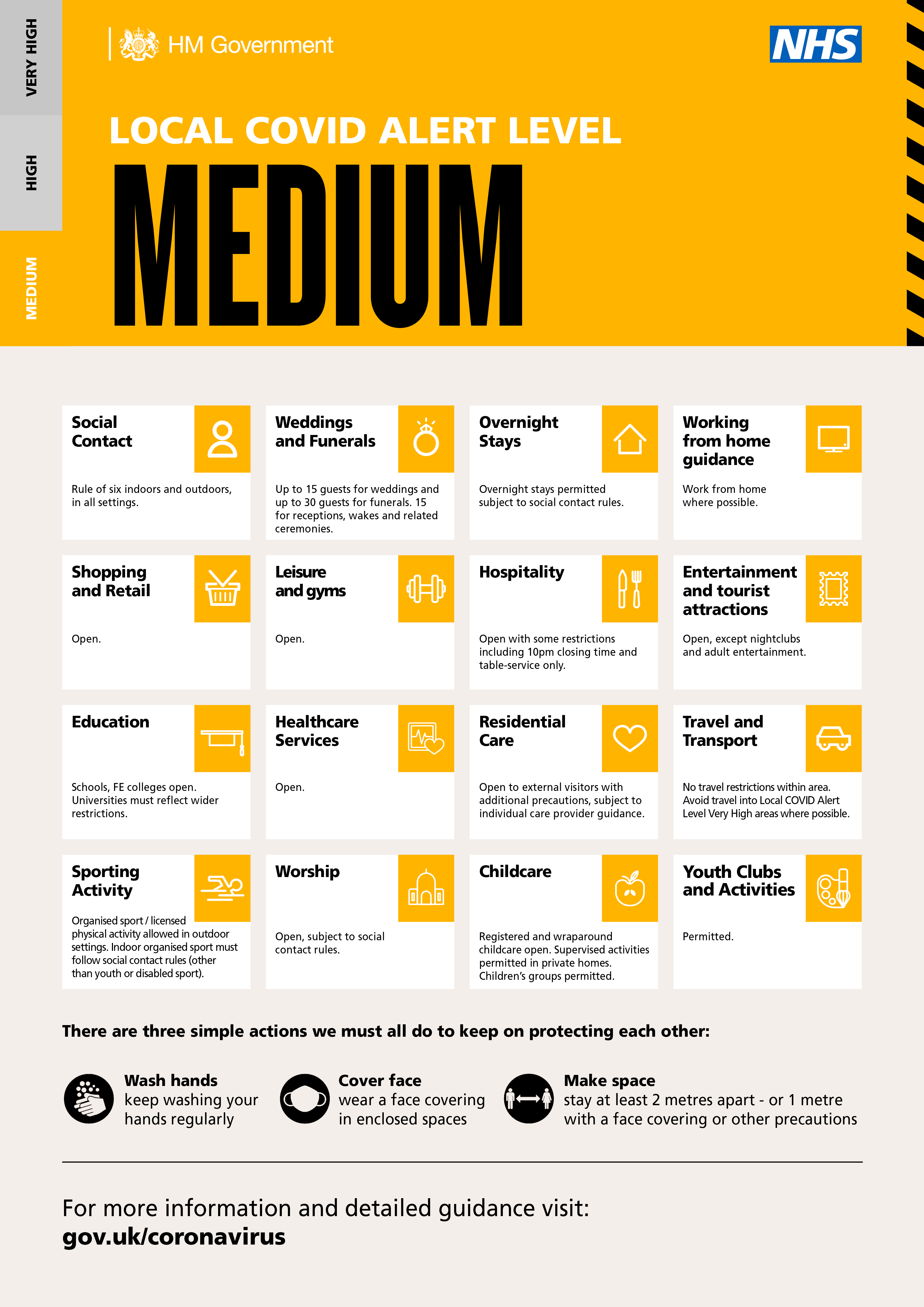
Tier 1 (Medium)

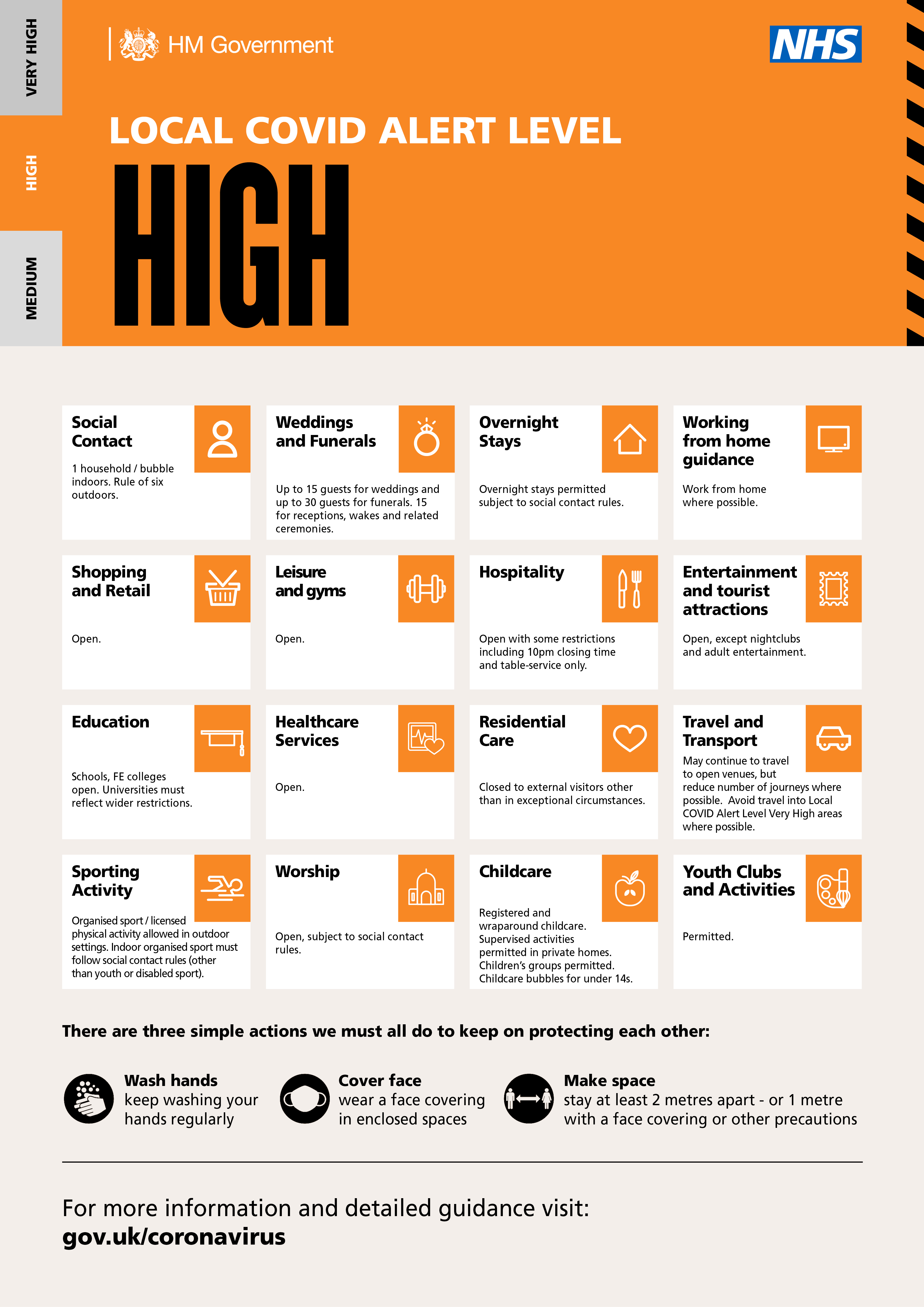
Tier 2 (High)

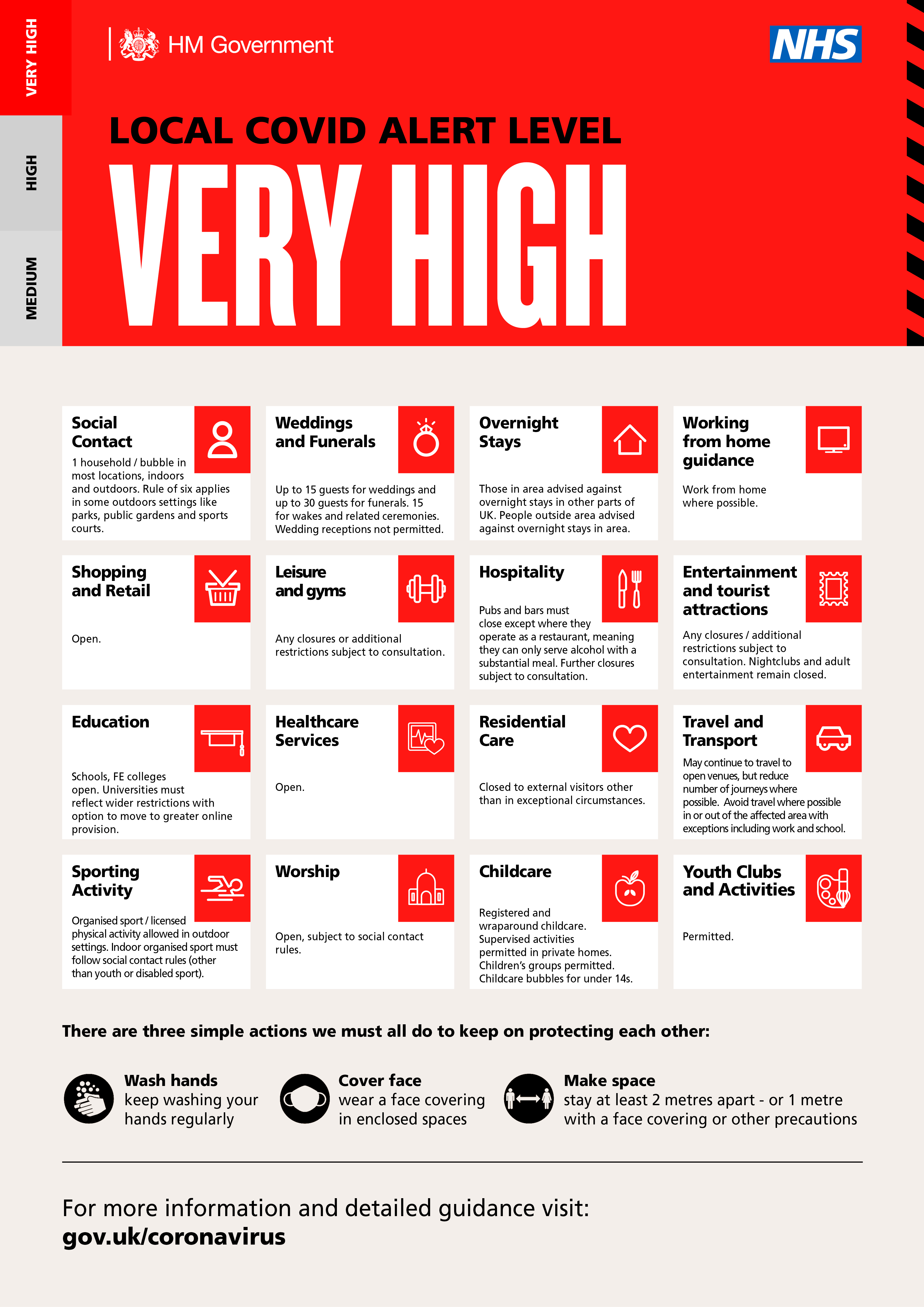
Tier 3 (Very High)

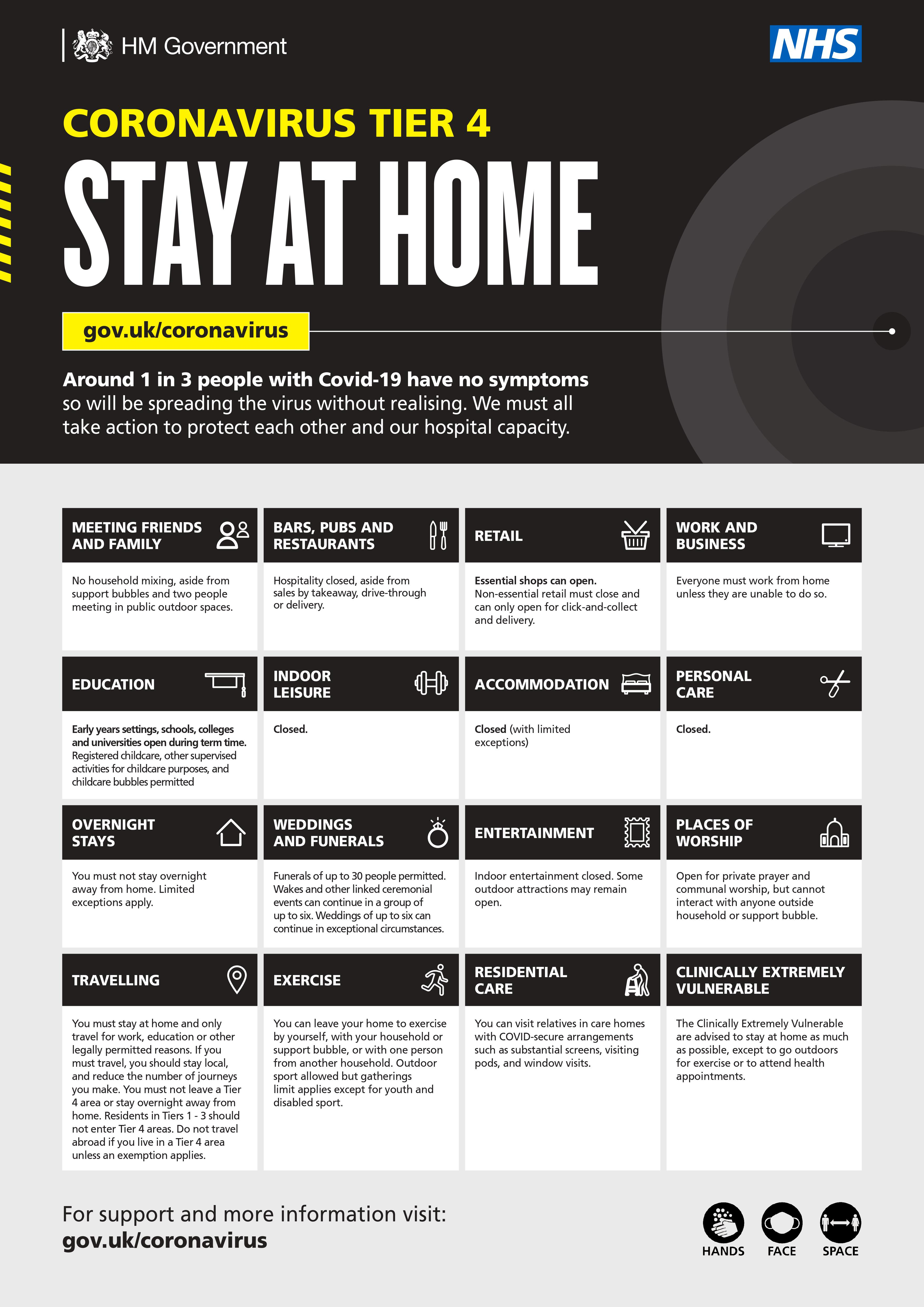
Tier 4 (Stay at Home) (prior to modifications in 2021)

The regulations revived the three-tier legal framework from the first COVID-19 tier regulations in England, though with changes to the restrictions defined by each tier. The areas within each tier were also different: almost all of England was placed into tier 2 or 3, with only Cornwall, the Isles of Scilly, and the Isle of Wight being placed in tier 1. A fourth tier was added by the Health Protection (Coronavirus, Restrictions) (All Tiers and Obligations of Undertakings) (England) (Amendment) Regulations 2020 (SI 2020/1611) on 20 December 2020. By 6 January 2021, all areas of England were in tier 4, where they remained until the regulations were revoked on 29 March.

A major difference from previous restrictions was that tiers were generally applied to larger areas such as counties or city regions rather than individual local authorities or smaller. In the original tiered areas, the only exception to this was Slough where rates were "much higher" than the rest of Berkshire and Buckinghamshire, districts like Tunbridge Wells and Ashford being placed in tier 3 even though they had lower than average rates.

== Restrictions on gatherings, all tiers ==
In all tiers, gatherings were restricted by size. In the spaces listed, the only permitted gatherings were as follows unless one of the exceptions applied:

Permitted gatherings
Space	Tier 1	Tier 2	Tier 3	Tier 4
Private dwelling (indoors)	Up to 6	None permitted	None permitted	None permitted
Other private indoor space	Up to 6	None permitted	None permitted	None permitted
Private dwelling (outdoors, e.g. garden)	Up to 6	Up to 6	None permitted	None permitted
Private outdoor space	Up to 6	Up to 6	None permitted	None permitted
Public outdoor space	Up to 6	Up to 6	Up to 6 *	Up to 2 **

* In tier 3, gatherings of no more than 6 people were allowed only in free-to-access public outdoor areas, and pay-to-access public outdoor sports grounds and facilities, botanical gardens and the gardens of castles, stately homes, historic houses or other heritage sites. All gatherings in outdoor areas that did not fall within that definition were prohibited, as were all gatherings at fairgrounds and funfairs.

** In tier 4, an individual was allowed to meet one other person only in free-to-access public outdoor areas, and pay-to-access botanical gardens and the gardens of castles, stately homes, historic houses or other heritage sites, as well as sculpture parks and allotments. All gatherings in outdoor areas that did not fall within that definition were prohibited, as were all gatherings at fairgrounds and funfairs.

=== Large gathering offence ===
On 29 January 2021 SI 97/2021 introduced a new 'large gathering offence' subject to penalty charges on a sliding scale between £400 and £6400. The offence was committed when the above restrictions were breached by more than 15 people gathered in a private dwelling, in educational accommodation, or at an indoor rave.

== Exceptions to the restrictions on gatherings ==
=== General and tier 1 exceptions ===
A substantial list of exceptions was provided for. All applied to tier 1, with more limited and fewer exceptions applying to tiers 2, 3 and 4.

General exceptions
Type	Indoor and outdoor exceptions	Applies				Ref
Type	Indoor and outdoor exceptions	Tier 1	Tier 2	Tier 3	Tier 4	Ref
Same or linked households	All members of a common household, or of two linked households ("support bubble")	Allowed	Allowed	Allowed	Allowed	
Permitted organised gatherings	Organised with precautions by a business, charity or public body after a risk assessment. Participants must attend either alone or as part of a sub-group of no more than 6 (apart from larger single or linked household groups).	Allowed	Allowed	Allowed	Not Allowed	
Education and training	A variety of specified situations including early years provision, school activities, apprenticeships, work experience, applying for a job, professional training and exams	Allowed	Allowed	Allowed	Allowed	
Gatherings necessary for certain purposes	Work, voluntary services, emergency assistance, avoiding harm, providing care to a vulnerable or disabled person, for the purposes of a house move	Allowed	Allowed	Allowed	Allowed	
Legal obligations and proceedings	Fulfilling a legal obligation or participating in legal proceedings	Allowed	Allowed	Allowed	Allowed	
Criminal justice accommodation	Any gathering in criminal justice accommodation	Allowed	Allowed	Allowed	Allowed	
Support groups	Formally organised support groups of no more than 15 people (not counting children below the age of five). Not allowed at a private dwelling	Allowed	Allowed	Allowed	Allowed	
Respite care	Respite care for a vulnerable or disabled person; a short break for a looked-after child	Allowed	Allowed	Allowed	Allowed	
Births	Attending a person giving birth	Allowed	Allowed	Allowed	Allowed	
Marriages and civil partnerships etc.	Ceremonies of no more than 15 people (six in tier 4) organised with precautions after a risk assessment; included non-faith ceremonies, but not at a private dwelling. Some restrictions relaxed for ceremonies of no more than six where one of the parties was seriously ill and was not expected to recover	Max 15 people	Max 15 people	Max 15 people	Max 6 people	
Wedding and civil partnership receptions	Receptions of no more than 15 people organised with precautions after a risk assessment. Not allowed at a private dwelling	Allowed	Allowed	Not Allowed	Not Allowed	
Funerals	No more than 30 people. Organised with precautions after a risk assessment. Must be in a public outdoor space or a business or charity premises. Not allowed at a private dwelling	Allowed	Allowed	Allowed	Allowed	
Commemorative event following a person's death	No more than 15 people (six in tier 4). Organised with precautions after a risk assessment. Not allowed at a private dwelling	Max 15 people	Max 15 people	Max 15 people	Max 6 people	
Protests	Organised with precautions by a business, charity, public body or political body after a risk assessment	Allowed	Allowed	Allowed	Not Allowed	
Elite sports	Training and competition for elite sportspersons and coaches	Allowed	Allowed	Allowed	Allowed	
Other sports	Organised outdoor sports or fitness activities with precautions after a risk assessment; indoor activities for disabled people. This exception did not extend to spectators or to parents of a child taking part	Allowed	Not Allowed	Not Allowed	Not Allowed	
Outdoor activities	An outdoor physical activity for which a licence or permit issued by a public body was required	Allowed	Not Allowed	Not Allowed	Not Allowed	
Children	Formal childcare; informal childcare provided by a linked childcare household; access arrangements; contact between siblings who do not live together; prospective adopters	Allowed	Allowed	Allowed	Some allowed, with more restrictions	
Parent and child groups	Formally-organised groups of no more than 15 people (not counting children below the age of five). Not allowed at a private dwelling	Max 15 people	Max 15 people	Max 15 people	Max 15 people	
Student and vacation households	Allowed a student in higher education to move to another household on a single occasion for the purpose of a vacation, and to return afterwards. This was originally permitted before 8 February, and then between 8 March and 28 April 2021. The student became a part of the vacation household during the vacation period	Allowed	Allowed	Allowed	Allowed	
Christmas period	Certain gatherings on 25 December 2020 only of no more than three linked Christmas households. See Linked Christmas households	Allowed	Allowed	Allowed	Not Allowed	
Picketing	Picketing with precautions after a risk assessment (in tier 4 from 26 December 2020)	Allowed	Allowed	Allowed	Allowed	
Nomination of candidates and petitioning	From 8 March 2021: Participating in the nomination of an election candidate, or petitioning for a referendum	Max 2 people	Max 2 people	Max 2 people	Max 2 people	
Campaigning	From 8 March 2021: Campaigning in an election or referendum. This could be to support or to prejudice the prospects of any particular party or candidate. Not allowed inside a private dwelling	Max 2 people	Max 2 people	Max 2 people	Max 2 people	
Observing an election or referendum	From 8 March 2021: Observing at an election or referendum	Allowed	Allowed	Allowed	Allowed	

=== Tier 2 exceptions ===
These were the same as for tier 1 except as follows:

- "Other sports": organised outdoor sports were still exempt, but organised fitness activities were not
- "Outdoor activities": outdoor physical activities involving a licence or permit not allowed
- Additional indoor exceptions were provided to the general tier 2 rule prohibiting gatherings in private indoor spaces:

Type	Applied	Indoor exceptions	Ref
Visiting a dying person	Tiers 2, 3 and 4	Visitor was a member of that person's household, a close family member, or a friend	
Visiting persons receiving treatment etc.	Tiers 2, 3 and 4	Visitor was a member of that person's household, a close family member, or a friend. Applied to hospitals, hospices and care homes	
Indoor sports	Tiers 2, 3 and 4	Organised indoor sports for disabled people. This exception did not extend to spectators or to parents of children taking part	

=== Tier 3 exceptions ===
These were largely the same as tier 2 but there was no exception for wedding and civil partnership receptions.

=== Tier 4 exceptions ===
These were the same as tier 3 with the following exceptions:

- No 'permitted organised gatherings'
- Wedding or civil partnership ceremonies were limited to six people
- Commemorative events following a death were limited to six people
- No special Christmas arrangements, thus normal tier 4 rules applied on 25 December 2020.

== Restrictions on leaving home in tier 4 ==
As originally made, SI 1374 controlled social interactions by imposing rules on gatherings; there was no general prohibition against leaving home. The amendments introduced on 20 December 2020 by SI 1611 however, brought in a new tier 4 (sometimes referred to as the "third lockdown") with much stricter rules, very similar to those of the second lockdown There remained no general prohibition against leaving home in tiers 1 to 3.

In tier 4 there was a general prohibition leaving or be outside one's own home (which included any associated garden or yard) without "reasonable excuse". No exhaustive definition of "reasonable excuse" was provided, though it included any of the following exceptions:

=== Reasonable excuses for leaving home in tier 4 ===
Reasonable excuses for leaving home
Exception	Name	Details	Ref
1	Necessary for certain purposes	See below	
2	Work, voluntary services, education, training etc.	To work or provide voluntary or charitable services, where not reasonably possible to do so from home; to access charitable services; for education or training; to provide care or assistance to a vulnerable person (anyone over 70, pregnant, or with a serious health condition); to provide emergency assistance; to fulfil a legal obligation; to access critical public services	
3	Elite athletes	For the purposes of training or competition	
4	Medical need etc.	To seek medical assistance, to get a test, to be vaccinated, or to access health, medical, or mental health services	
5	Support and respite	To attend a permitted support group meeting; respite-related reasons	
6	Death bed visit	To visit a household member, close family member, or friend you believe to be dying	
7	Funerals etc.	To attend a funeral or an event commemorating a person's life; or certain visits to a burial ground or garden of remembrance	
8	Marriages and civil partnerships	To attend a licensed wedding where one of the participants is seriously ill and is not expected to recover	
9	Children	To take a child to school; childcare access arrangements; children in care; prospective adopters; informal childcare by linked childcare household. To take a child to registered childcare or supervised activities for children but only where necessary to enable a critical worker to work, search for work or undertake training or education (until 6 January 2021 anyone with parental responsibility could make use of this exemption)	
10	Animal welfare	To care for or exercise a pet; to attend a vet	
11	Returning home	Returning home from a holiday that was started before the regulations came into force	
12	Prison visits	Visits by a close family member or friend	
13	Voting	For the purpose of voting	
14	Permitted outdoor sports gatherings	Attending (but not spectating at) an organised outdoor sports gathering for disabled people. (Until 6 January 2021 gatherings for children were also permitted).	
15	Parent and child groups	Attending a permitted parent and child group meeting	
16	Student and vacation households	A higher education student could leave to switch households for a vacation on one occasion before 8 February 2021, and return afterwards. Also permitted on one occasion between 8 March and 28 April 2021.	
17	Picketing	From 26 December 2020: Attending a lawful picket line	
18	Nomination of candidates and petitioning	From 8 March 2021: Participating in the nomination of an election candidate, or petitioning for a referendum	
19	Campaigning	From 8 March 2021: Campaigning in an election or referendum; could be to support or to prejudice the prospects of any particular party or candidate	
20	Observing an election or referendum	From 8 March 2021: Observing at an election or referendum	

=== Exception 1: leaving tier 4 home necessary for certain purposes ===
This exception covered a variety of situations:

Exception 1 situations
Exception	Details
1a	Where reasonably necessary to leave home to buy goods or services for oneself, a household member, a vulnerable person (anyone over 70, pregnant, or with a serious health condition) or someone in their household
1b	To obtain or deposit money
1c	To take exercise outside. This could be either alone, or with household or linked household members. Also permitted was to exercise outside in a public place with any one other person (for this purpose, children under five and up to two carers for a disabled person were not counted)
1d [Not between 6 Jan and 7 Mar 2021]	This exception originally applied until 5 January 2021, when it was removed; it was restored on 8 March 2021: To visit a public outdoor place for open air recreation with any one other person (for this purpose, children under five and up to two carers for a disabled person were not counted). Visiting a public outdoor place for open air recreation with any number of household or linked household members was also permitted
1da	From 26 December 2020 to 5 January 2021 only: To visit outdoor attractions at an aquarium, zoo, safari park, or other outdoor animal attractions. This exception was removed from 6 January 2021.
1e	To attend a place of worship
1f	In connection with the purchase, sale, letting or rental of residential property
1g	To visit a linked household
1h	To collect pre-ordered food, drink, or other goods, or visit a food or drink service business to obtain a takeaway
1i	To visit a waste disposal or recycling centre

== Movement between tiers ==
There was no general prohibition against leaving a home tier area, or against movement between tiers. An individual who travelled between tiers to join a gathering was generally subject to the rules of their home tier, or the tier of the place to which they travelled, whichever was higher. Anyone living in tier 1, 2 or 3 was permitted to travel to a higher tier area, but could not participate in a gathering that was prohibited in the higher tier area. Anyone living in tier 2, 3 or 4 who travelled to a lower tier area could not participate in any gathering that would have been prohibited in their home area. As noted above, people resident in tier 4 were permitted to leave home and travel only if they had a 'reasonable excuse' to do so.

== Business closures ==
Certain businesses were required to close or limit their operations.

=== General and tier 1 business restrictions ===
	Applies	Details	Ref	Exceptions	Ref
Businesses that must close	All tiers	Must close: nightclubs, dance halls, discotheques and facilities for public dancing to music at night, sexual entertainment venues, hostess bars, shisha bars/hookah lounges		Where the owner runs a separate shop, cafe or restaurant, or an online delivery service	
Opening hours restrictions	Tiers 1 and 2	Must stop accepting orders at 22:00, and must close between 23:00 and 05:00: restaurants*, food and drink takeaways*, cafes and workplace canteens*, bars*, pubs*, social clubs*, casinos*, bowling alleys, cinemas, theatres, amusement arcades or other indoor leisure centres, funfairs (indoors or outdoors), theme and adventure parks and activities, bingo halls, concert halls, sportsgrounds		Supermarkets, convenience stores, corner shops, newsagents, pharmacists, petrol stations; motorway service stations; air and sea ports; on public transport; online food and drink deliveries and collections, drive-through takeaways. Cinemas, theatres and concert halls may remain open after 22:00 for the purpose of completing performances which began before that time	
Table service and customer eating	Tier 1 only	Restrictions on service: venues marked * above which sell alcohol must serve all food and drink to customers seated at tables. Customers must order at the table, and must remain seated while eating and drinking. Venues so marked which do not sell alcohol need not serve customers at a table, but they must ensure that customers eating and drinking on the premises remain seated			

=== Tier 2 business restrictions ===
The tier 1 list of businesses that had to close, and the opening hour restrictions, also applied in tier 2. In addition, there were the following restrictions:

	Applies	Details	Ref	Exceptions	Ref
Pubs and bars to serve alcohol as part of a table meal	Tier 2	Restrictions on service: pubs, bars, and other venues selling alcohol for consumption on the premises could remain open only if they served alcohol only as part of a table meal (at least equivalent to breakfast or the main course of a midday or evening meal). The meal had to be eaten while seated at a table (not at a serving counter). This rule applied equally to areas adjacent to the premises used by customers		Alcohol served as part of a hotel's room service	
Bars and non-food pubs to close	Tiers 2 and 3	Must close: pubs, bars, and other venues that sell alcohol for consumption on the premises other than as part of a table meal			

=== Tier 3 business restrictions ===
The tier 1 and tier 2 lists of businesses that must close also applied in tier 3. In addition, there were the following restrictions:

	Applies	Details	Ref	Exceptions	Ref
Further businesses to close	Tier 3	Must close: indoor play areas, trampoline/inflatable parks; casinos; bingo halls; bowling alleys; snooker and pool halls; amusement arcades; laser quest and escape rooms; theatres and cinemas; concert halls; many conference centres and exhibition halls; indoor skating rinks; circuses; the indoor parts of many visitor and heritage attractions		Where the owner ran a separate shop, cafe or restaurant, or an online delivery service; drive-in theatres and cinemas; visitor toilets	
Holiday accommodation to close	Tier 3	Must close: holiday accommodation		Various special cases including venue used as a main residence, and where needed for work or education; also, any accommodation provided during the period 24 to 26 December 2020.	
No consumption of food or drink on the premises	Tier 3	Must close: restaurants, cafes and workplace canteens, bars, pubs, social clubs providing food and drink		Where the owner ran a separate cafe or restaurant, or an online delivery service; food or drink served as part of a hotel's room service; motorway service stations, air and sea ports	
Opening hours restrictions	Tier 3	Must close between 23:00 and 05:00: drive-in theatres and cinemas; outdoor concert venues; outdoor attractions at theme parks, fairgrounds and funfairs		Venues could stay open after 23:00 to conclude a performance starting before 22:00	
Food and drink takeaways	Tier 3	Limited service between 23:00 and 05:00: between those hours food and drink takeaways could operate click-and-collect and drive-through services only			

=== Tier 4 business restrictions ===
These were similar but not identical to those of the second lockdown that was in place between 5 November and 2 December 2020.

Business closures and restrictions
	Restrictions	Exceptions
Businesses	Must close: Nightclubs, dance halls, discos, sexual entertainment venues, hostess bars, venues with waterpipes or that provided for the consumption of nicotine or other substances on the premises Must close: Restaurants, cafes, bars, pubs, social clubs, food and drink takeaways Must close: Dance and fitness studios, gyms, sports courts, swimming pools, playgrounds, soft play areas, indoor leisure centres and entertainment venues, casinos, bingo halls, bowling alleys, indoor riding centres, amusement arcades, cinemas, theatres, concert halls, skating rinks, circuses, water parks, theme parks, fairgrounds and funfairs, adventure parks, model villages, kitchen, bathroom, tile and glazing showrooms, museums and galleries, indoor venues at visitor attractions, film studio attractions, conference centres, exhibition halls, betting shops, spas, tanning salons, nail salons, beauty salons, hair salons and barbers, massage parlours, tattoo and piercing parlours, carpet stores, motor showrooms, manual car washes, most auction houses, most outdoor markets Must close: From 6 January 2021: outdoor sportsgrounds and facilities, including outdoor gyms, sports courts, swimming pools, water sports, shooting and archery venues, golf courses, and driving ranges; retail travel agents	Food and drink takeaways operated by supermarkets, convenience stores, pharmacists and petrol stations Food and drink provided at motorway service stations, ports, airports and international rail terminals, or on public transport Restaurants etc could offer a takeaway service between 05:00 and 23:00 (with click and collect only outside those hours) From 6 January 2021, hospitality venues could no longer sell alcohol to take away. Outdoor markets selling food or livestock, and outdoor markets consisting of 'permitted retailers' (see below)
Retail shops	Must close: All retail shops, apart from 'permitted retailers' (see below)	Delivery and collection in response to pre-booked orders (click and collect). The customer collecting could not enter the premises
Libraries	Must close: Libraries	Libraries could open for voting purposes, support groups, childcare, education and training, voluntary or public services
Holiday accommodation	Must close: All types of holiday accommodation	Various exceptions including work, self-isolation, use while moving house, people unable to return home etc
Community centres and halls	Must close: Community centres and halls	Essential voluntary services, education and training, support groups, childcare and supervised activities
Permitted retailers	Could remain open: Food retailers, including food markets, supermarkets, convenience stores and corner shops, off licences, pharmacies and chemists, newsagents, animal rescue centres, building merchants, petrol stations, car repair and MOT services, bicycle shops, taxi or vehicle hire businesses, banks, building societies, cash points, currency exchange offices, post offices, funeral directors, laundrettes and dry cleaners, medical, health and mental health services, vets, pet shops, agricultural supplies, storage and distribution facilities, delivery drop off or collection points, car parks, public toilets, garden centres, automatic car washes, mobility and support shops	

== Linked households ==
The concept of "linked households" (referred to in government statements as "support bubbles") was brought forward from previous regulations, but in extended form. Two households that were linked under these regulations could generally meet as if they were one household. First and second households could link if all the adults in both households agreed. The first household had to comprise:

- A single adult
- Any number of children and no adults
- One adult and any number of children who were under the age of 18 on 12 June 2020
- Any number of adults and a child who was under the age of one on 2 December 2020
- Any number of adults and a child with a disability requiring continuous care, the child being under the age of five on 2 December 2020
- One or more persons with a disability requiring continuous care, on their own or together with any number of individuals who do not have such a disability (but only one of the non-disabled individuals may be aged 18 or over on 12 June 2020).

Where the first household included a higher education student on vacation, the presence of the student was ignored for this purpose.

There were no limits on the second household, which could include any number of adults and children.

A household could only be linked with one other household at any one time. But for the first time, linked households could be changed if all members of a linked household agreed; this was subject to a minimum 14 day period (reduced to 10 days from 14 December 2020) between the final meeting of the former linked households and the first meeting of the new.

== Linked childcare households ==
The concept of "linked childcare households" was brought forward from previous regulations. It was separate from "linked households".

A household with at least one child aged 13 or under could link with another household providing informal childcare (formal childcare, for example by a childminder, was excluded). Only one linked childcare household was permitted at any one time, and all adults in both households had to agree. Changes to the linking were allowed subject to a minimum 14 day period (reduced to 10 days from 14 December 2020) between the final meeting of the former linked childcare households and the first meeting of the new.

== Linked Christmas households ==
As originally made, the regulations provided for more relaxed Christmas rules on gatherings during the 'Christmas period', defined as 23–27 December 2020, but three days before they were due to enter into effect SI 1611 altered the definition and restricted the Christmas period to 25 December only. The amended Christmas rules given below applied to tiers 1 to 3 only; there were no special Christmas arrangements in tier 4.

The Christmas rules introduced a new concept of "linked Christmas households", separate from "linked households" and "linked childcare households".

One or more members of one household could form a linked Christmas household with one or more members of no more than two other households from a tier 1, 2 or 3 area, regardless of size, to form a linked Christmas household for the purpose of gathering during the Christmas 2020 period, if all people to be linked agreed. Two households that were already linked households counted as one household for this purpose. A person could be a member of only one linked Christmas household, except that a child who did not live in the same household as both parents could be a member of a linked Christmas household formed by each parent. There was a special exception for higher education students on vacation.

Linked Christmas households were exempted from some of the restrictions on gatherings on 25 December. During that period, gatherings of no more than three linked Christmas households were permitted provided that they took place in a private dwelling, a place of worship or a public outdoor place (defined as anywhere the public are admitted free of charge, as well as outdoor sports grounds, botanical gardens, gardens or grounds of a castle, stately home, historic house or other heritage site, but excluding fairgrounds and funfairs). Attendees could also travel together, as gatherings in conveyances were permitted.

A Christmas gathering could extend beyond the Christmas period (25 December) in the event that an attendee could not return home due to unforeseen travel disruption.

These Christmas-specific rules were revoked on 19 January 2021.

== Declaration on leaving the United Kingdom ==
On 8 March 2021, SI 2021/247 introduced a new requirement for travellers leaving the United Kingdom to have with them a completed travel declaration form when they arrived at an embarkation point. On the form, the traveller had to give a variety of personal details, to state the reason for being away from home, and to certify that the information provided was true. Anyone who failed to complete a form and who did not do so when directed by an authorised person could be required to return home or leave the embarkation point without departing from the UK. Failure to comply was an offence. The regulations provided a long list of travellers who were exempt, including diplomats, essential government workers, transit passengers, hauliers, seamen, aircraft crews and channel tunnel workers.

== Reviews and expiry ==
The Secretary of State had to review the need for the restrictions every 28 days, and also the applicability of the tier areas every 14 days.

The regulations were originally stated to expire at the end of 2 February 2021, later moved to 31 March 2021. They were ultimately repealed on 29 March 2021 and replaced by the Health Protection (Coronavirus, Restrictions) (Steps) (England) Regulations 2021.

== Enforcement ==
Breaches of the regulations were offences and could be prosecuted or dealt with by fixed penalty notices with penalties ranging up to £10,000 for repeated violations.

== Inconsistency in application by government officials ==
=== British government staff Christmas parties controversy ===
In December 2021, it was reported that a number of social gatherings of United Kingdom government staff had occurred in the run-up to Christmas during the period when the restrictions detailed above were in force. The government denied any rules were broken but commenced an investigation into whether any breaches of the rules had occurred.

=== Inconsistencies regarding application of exercise rules ===
The regulations did not define what constitutes exercise, nor how far an individual could travel to in order to undertake exercise. Government guidelines stated that individuals should exercise in their "local area", but there was no such requirement in the regulations. Similarly, the guidelines stated that exercise "should be limited to once per day", but the regulations did not require or even mention such a thing.

On 6 January 2021 fixed penalty notices were handed to two women by Derbyshire Police, reportedly for travelling five miles (eight kilometres) to go for a walk. The police force subsequently stated that it was reviewing the action based on new national guidelines, but issuance of the notices was nevertheless supported by the health secretary, Matt Hancock. This led to calls for greater clarity as to what travel was legally permitted for the purpose of exercise. Four days later it was announced that the notices had been revoked and that Derbyshire Police had apologised to the women.

It was reported that on 10 January 2021 Boris Johnson had been seen cycling in the Queen Elizabeth Olympic Park, eleven miles (eighteen kilometres) from Downing Street. Metropolitan Police Commissioner Dame Cressida Dick stated that the trip had not been "against the law - that's for sure" but called for greater clarity in the regulations.

== Summary of main changes, by date ==
This chronological table lists the main changes to the second tier regulations.

SI	In effect	Main changes	Ref
1533	16 Dec 2020	All London boroughs and the City of London, Essex (except Colchester, Tendring and Uttlesford districts) and the Hertfordshire districts of Broxbourne, Hertsmere, Three Rivers and Watford were moved up from tier 2 to tier 3.	
1572	19 Dec 2020	The counties of Bedfordshire, Buckinghamshire, the rest of Berkshire, the Cambridgeshire district of Peterborough, the rest of Hertfordshire, Surrey (except Waverley district), the East Sussex districts of Hastings and Rother and the Hampshire districts of Gosport, Havant and Portsmouth moved up to tier 3. Bristol county and North Somerset district moved down to tier 2. Herefordshsire moved down to tier 1.	
1611	20 Dec 2020	The counties of Bedfordshire, Buckinghamshire, Berkshire, the Cambridgeshire district of Peterborough, Essex (except Colchester, Tendring and Uttlesford districts), Hertfordshire, Kent, Surrey (except Waverley district), the East Sussex districts of Hastings and Rother, the Hampshire districts of Gosport, Havant and Portsmouth, all London boroughs and the City of London moved up to a newly created tier 4.	
1646	26 Dec 2020	The rest of Cambridgeshire, the rest of Essex, the rest of Hampshire (except New Forest district), Norfolk, Oxfordshire, Suffolk, the Surrey district of Waverley and the rest of Sussex moved up to tier 4. The counties of Bristol, Cheshire (apart from Halton district), the rest of Gloucestershire, the rest of Somerset (except Bath and North East Somerset), Northamptonshire, the Wiltshire district of Swindon, the Isle of Wight, the Hampshire district of New Forest moved up to tier 3. Cornwall (except the Isles of Scilly) and Herefordshire moved up to tier 2.	
1654	31 Dec 2020	The counties of Cheshire (apart from Halton district), Cumbria, Derbyshire, Durham, Gloucestershire (except South Gloucestershire district), Isle of Wight, Greater Manchester, Lancashire, Leicestershire, Lincolnshire, Northamptonshire, Northumberland, Nottinghamshire, Somerset (except Bath and Borth East Somerset and North Somerset district), Staffordshire, Tyne and Wear, Warwickshire, West Midlands, the Wiltshire district of Swindon, the Dorset district of Bournemouth, Christchurch and Poole, the Hampshire district of New Forest, the Stockton-on-Tees district moved up to tier 4. The counties of Cornwall (except the Isles of Scilly), Devon, Dorset (except Bournemouth, Christchurch and Poole district), Herefordshire, Merseyside, North Yorkshire (except Stockton-on-Tees district), Rutland, Shropshire, Wiltshire (except Swindon district), Worcestershire, and the Somerset district of Bath and North East Somerset moved up to tier 3.	
8	6 Jan 2021	All areas of England moved into a stricter tier 4; expiry date moved from 2 Feb to 31 March; no longer allowed to meet with one other person for 'recreation' in an outdoor public place; children's outdoor sports gatherings no longer allowed; outdoor zoos and wildlife attractions closed again; hospitality venues can no longer sell takeaway alcohol; various new business closures.	
53	20 Jan 2021	Spent Christmas rules revoked; minor amendments and corrections.	
97	29 Jan 2021	Fines for attending gatherings of more than 15 attendees in private dwellings or educational accommodation, or indoor raves of more than 15 attendees, increased to range from £400 to £6,400. Other minor amendments and corrections.	
247	8 Mar 2021	Added requirement for people leaving the UK to fill in a travel declaration form; added new exception to allow people to leave home to meet one other person for recreation in a public outdoor space, and also for election purposes. Allowed students to leave their student household for one vacation visit to be taken before 29 April.	

Tiers by local government district for each period of being in force
2-15 December 2020

16-18 December 2020

19 December 2020

20-25 December 2020

26-30 December 2020

31 December 2020 - 5 January 2021

6 January 2021 – 28 March 2021
Tier 1 Tier 2 Tier 3 Tier 4

=== Local authority areas in each tier, by date ===
This table lists the dates during which specific areas fell within each tier.

Tier	Area	Periods in Tier 1	Periods in Tier 2	Periods in Tier 3	Periods in Tier 4
Tier 4	South East: Kent County Council, Medway Council, Slough Borough Council	N/A	N/A	2 December 2020 – 19 December 2020	20 December 2020– 28 March 2021
Tier 4	East of England: Basildon Borough Council, (Note: The local districts within the area covered by Essex County Council were subject to separate restrictions by district from 16 December 2020 to 26 December 2020. From 26 December 2020 to 5 January 2021 the restrictions were applied in the regulations to the area of Essex County Council. From 6 January 2021 to 28 March 2021 regulations were applied to England as a whole rather than to individual local authority areas.) Braintree District Council, Brentwood Borough Council, Broxbourne Borough Council, (Note: The local districts within the area covered by Hertfordshire County Council were subject to separate restrictions by district from 16 December 2020 to 19 December 2020. From 20 December 2020 to 5 January 2021 the restrictions were applied in the regulations to the area of Hertfordshire County Council. From 6 January 2021 to 28 March 2021 regulations were applied to England as a whole rather than to individual local authority areas.) Castle Point Borough Council, Chelmsford City Council, Epping Forest District Council, Harlow District Council, Hertsmere Borough Council, Maldon District Council, Rochford District Council, Southend-on-Sea Borough Council, Three Rivers District Council, Thurrock Council, Watford Borough Council London: London boroughs of: Westminster, Barking and Dagenham, Barnet, Bexley, Brent, Bromley, Camden, Croydon, Ealing, Enfield, Hackney, Hammersmith and Fulham, Haringey, Harrow, Havering, Hillingdon, Hounslow, Islington, Lambeth, Lewisham, Merton, Newham, Redbridge, Richmond upon Thames, Southwark, Sutton, Tower Hamlets, Waltham Forest, and Wandsworth. Royal boroughs of: Greenwich, Kensington and Chelsea and Kingston upon Thames. City of London, Inner Temple and Middle Temple	N/A	2 December 2020–15 December 2020	16 December 2020–19 December 2020	20 December 2020– 28 March 2021
Tier 4	East of England: Bedford Borough Council, Central Bedfordshire Council, Dacorum Borough Council, East Hertfordshire District Council, Luton Borough Council, Milton Keynes Council, North Hertfordshire District Council, Peterborough City Council, Stevenage Borough Council, St Albans City and District Council, Welwyn Hatfield Borough Council South East: Bracknell Forest Council, Buckinghamshire Council, Elmbridge Borough Council, (Note: The local districts within the area covered by Surrey County Council were subject to separate restrictions by district from 19 December 2020 to 26 December 2020. From 26 December 2020 to 5 January 2021 the restrictions were applied in the regulations to the area of Surrey County Council. From 6 January 2021 to 28 March 2021 regulations were applied to England as a whole rather than to individual local authority areas.) Epsom and Ewell Borough Council, Gosport Borough Council, (Note: The local districts within the area covered by Hampshire County Council were subject to separate restrictions by district from 19 December 2020 to 31 December 2020. From 31 December 2020 to 5 January 2021 the restrictions were applied in the regulations to the area of Hampshire County Council. From 6 January 2021 to 28 March 2021 regulations were applied to England as a whole rather than to individual local authority areas.) Guildford Borough Council, Hastings Borough Council, (Note: The local districts within the area covered by East Sussex County Council were subject to separate restrictions by district from 19 December 2020 to 26 December 2020. From 26 December 2020 to 5 January 2021 the restrictions were applied in the regulations to the area of East Sussex County Council. From 6 January 2021 to 28 March 2021 regulations were applied to England as a whole rather than to individual local authority areas.) Havant Borough Council, Mole Valley District Council, Portsmouth City Council, Reading Borough Council, Reigate and Banstead Borough Council, Rother District Council, Royal Borough of Windsor and Maidenhead, Runnymede Borough Council, Spelthorne Borough Council, Surrey Heath Borough Council, Tandridge District Council, West Berkshire Council, Woking Borough Council, Wokingham Borough Council	N/A	2 December 2020–18 December 2020	19 December 2020	20 December 2020– 28 March 2021
Tier 4	East of England: Cambridgeshire County Council, Colchester Borough Council, Norfolk County Council, Suffolk County Council, Tendring District Council, Uttlesford District Council South East: Basingstoke and Deane Borough Council, Brighton and Hove City Council, East Hampshire District Council, Eastbourne Borough Council, Eastleigh Borough Council, Fareham Borough Council, Hart District Council, Lewes District Council, Oxfordshire County Council, Rushmoor Borough Council, Southampton City Council, Test Valley Borough Council, Waverley Borough Council, Wealden District Council, West Sussex County Council, Winchester City Council	N/A	2 December 2020 – 25 December 2020	N/A	26 December 2020– 28 March 2021
Tier 4	North West: Blackburn with Darwen Borough Council, Blackpool Council, Bolton Metropolitan Borough Council, Bury Metropolitan Borough Council, Lancashire County Council, Manchester City Council, Oldham Metropolitan Borough Council, Rochdale Borough Council, Salford City Council, Stockport Metropolitan Borough Council, Tameside Metropolitan Borough Council, Trafford Metropolitan Borough Council, Wigan Metropolitan Borough Council North East: Darlington Borough Council, Durham County Council, Gateshead Borough Council, Hartlepool Borough Council, Middlesbrough Council, Newcastle upon Tyne City Council, North Tyneside Borough Council, Northumberland County Council, Redcar and Cleveland Borough Council, South Tyneside Borough Council, Stockton-on-Tees Borough Council, Sunderland City Council East Midlands: Derby City Council, Derbyshire County Council, Leicester City Council, Leicestershire County Council, Lincolnshire County Council, Nottingham City Council, Nottinghamshire County Council West Midlands: Birmingham City Council, City of Wolverhampton Council, Coventry City Council, Dudley Metropolitan Borough Council, Sandwell Metropolitan Borough Council, Solihull Metropolitan Borough Council, Staffordshire County Council, Stoke-on-Trent Borough Council, Walsall Metropolitan Borough Council, Warwickshire County Council	N/A	N/A	2 December 2020 – 30 December 2020	31 December 2020 – 28 March 2021
Tier 4	North West: Cheshire East Council, Cheshire West and Chester Council, Warrington Borough Council East Midlands: Northamptonshire County Council South East: New Forest District Council South West: Gloucestershire County Council, Somerset County Council, Swindon Borough Council	N/A	2 December 2020 – 25 December 2020	26 December 2020 – 30 December 2020	31 December 2020–28 March 2021
Tier 4	Isle of Wight Council	2 December 2020 – 25 December 2020	N/A	26 December 2020–30 December 2020	31 December 2020–28 March 2021
Tier 4	North West: Cumbria County Council South West: Bournemouth, Christchurch and Poole Council	N/A	2 December 2020 – 30 December 2020	N/A	31 December 2020–28 March 2021
Tier 4	Council of the Isles of Scilly	2 December 2020–5 January 2021	N/A	N/A	6 January 2021–28 March 2021
Tier 4	Yorkshire and The Humber: Barnsley Metropolitan Borough Council, Calderdale Metropolitan Borough Council, City of Bradford Metropolitan District Council, Doncaster Metropolitan Borough Council, East Riding of Yorkshire Council, Hull City Council, Kirklees Metropolitan Borough Council, Leeds City Council, North Lincolnshire Council, Rotherham Metropolitan Borough Council, Sheffield City Council, Wakefield Metropolitan District Council, North East Lincolnshire Council South West: South Gloucestershire Council	N/A	N/A	2 December 2020–5 January 2021	6 January 2021–28 March 2021
Tier 4	South West: Bristol City Council, North Somerset Council	N/A	19 December 2020–25 December 2020	2 December 2020–18 December 2020, 26 December 2020–5 January 2021	6 January 2021– 28 March 2021
Tier 4	North West: Halton Borough Council, Knowsley Metropolitan Borough Council, Liverpool City Council, Sefton Borough Council, St Helens Borough Council, Wirral Metropolitan Borough Council Yorkshire and The Humber: City of York Council, North Yorkshire County Council East Midlands: Rutland County Council West Midlands: Shropshire Council, Telford and Wrekin Borough Council, Worcestershire County Council South West: Bath and North East Somerset Council, Devon County Council, Dorset Council, Plymouth City Council, Torbay Council, Wiltshire Council	N/A	2 December 2020–30 December 2020	31 December 2020–5 January 2021	6 January 2021– 28 March 2021
Tier 4	Herefordshire Council	19 December 2020–25 December 2020	2 December 2020–18 December 2020, 26 December 2020 – 30 December 2020	31 December 2020–5 January 2021	6 January 2021– 28 March 2021
Tier 4	Cornwall Council	2 December 2020–25 December 2020	26 December 2020–30 December 2020	31 December 2020–5 January 2021	6 January 2021– 28 March 2021

== Bibliography ==
- "SI 350". Legislation.gov.uk. 26 March 2020. The Health Protection (Coronavirus, Restrictions) (England) Regulations 2020.
- "SI 684". Legislation.gov.uk. 4 July 2020. The Health Protection (Coronavirus, Restrictions) (England) (No. 2) Regulations 2020.
- "SI 685". Legislation.gov.uk. 4 July 2020. The Health Protection (Coronavirus, Restrictions) (Leicester) Regulations 2020.
- "SI 1103". Legislation.gov.uk. 14 October 2020. The Health Protection (Coronavirus, Local COVID-19 Alert Level) (Medium) (England) Regulations 2020.
- "SI 1374". Legislation.gov.uk. 2 December 2020. The Health Protection (Coronavirus, Restrictions) (All Tiers) (England) Regulations 2020.
- "SI 1518". Legislation.gov.uk. 14 December 2020. The Health Protection (Coronavirus, Restrictions) (Self- Isolation and Linked Households) (England) Regulations 2020.
- "SI 1533". Legislation.gov.uk. 16 December 2020. The Health Protection (Coronavirus, Restrictions) (All Tiers) (England) (Amendment) Regulations 2020.
- "SI 1572". Legislation.gov.uk. 19 December 2020. The Health Protection (Coronavirus, Restrictions) (All Tiers) (England) (Amendment) (No. 2) Regulations 2020.
- "SI 1611". Legislation.gov.uk. 20 December 2020. The Health Protection (Coronavirus, Restrictions) (All Tiers and Obligations of Undertakings) (England) (Amendment) Regulations 2020.
- "SI 1646". Legislation.gov.uk. 26 December 2020. The Health Protection (Coronavirus, Restrictions) (All Tiers) (England) (Amendment) (No. 3) Regulations 2020.
- "SI 1654". Legislation.gov.uk. 31 December 2020. The Health Protection (Coronavirus, Restrictions) (All Tiers) (England) (Amendment) (No. 4) Regulations 2020.
- "SI 8". Legislation.gov.uk. 6 January 2021. The Health Protection (Coronavirus, Restrictions) (No. 3) and (All Tiers) (England) (Amendment) Regulations 2021.
- "SI 53". Legislation.gov.uk. 20 January 2021. The Health Protection (Coronavirus, Restrictions) (All Tiers) (England) (Amendment) Regulations 2021.
- "SI 97". Legislation.gov.uk. 29 January 2021. The Health Protection (Coronavirus, Restrictions) (All Tiers and Self-Isolation) (England) (Amendment) Regulations 2021.
- "SI 247". Legislation.gov.uk. 8 March 2021. The Health Protection (Coronavirus) (Wearing of Face Coverings in a Relevant Place and Restrictions: All Tiers) (England) (Amendment) Regulations 2021.
