= Health Protection (Coronavirus, International Travel) (England) Regulations 2020 =

United Kingdom emergency legislation

- Statutory Instrument
- Parliament of the United Kingdom
- Citation: SI 2020/568
- Introduced by: Matt Hancock, Secretary of State for Health and Social Care
- Territorial extent: England

Dates
- Made: 2 June 2020
- Laid before Parliament: 3 June 2020
- Commencement: 8 June 2020
- Revoked: 17 May 2021

Other legislation
- Made under: Public Health (Control of Disease) Act 1984
- Revoked by: Health Protection (Coronavirus, International Travel and Operator Liability) (England) Regulations 2021

Status: Revoked

Text of the Health Protection (Coronavirus, International Travel) (England) Regulations 2020 as in force today (including any amendments) within the United Kingdom, from legislation.gov.uk.

The Health Protection (Coronavirus, International Travel) (England) Regulations 2020 (SI 2020/568) is a statutory instrument (SI) made on 2 June 2020 by the Secretary of State for Health and Social Care, Matt Hancock, in response to the COVID-19 pandemic. The regulations aimed to reduce the possibility of infection spreading from travellers from overseas. They imposed requirements from 8 June 2020 on certain categories of travellers arriving in England from outside the Common Travel Area (all regions of the United Kingdom plus the Republic of Ireland, the Channel Islands and Isle of Man). Travellers falling within the regulations had to provide specified information on entry, and some had to undergo a fourteen-day period of self-isolation (later reduced to ten days).

As initially made, the requirements applied in respect of all travel to England from anywhere outside the Common Travel Area, but from 10 July 2020 travellers from a list of "exempt countries and territories" were not subject to the requirement to self-isolate. Later amendments introduced further refinements including "additional measures" imposed on travellers from certain areas, and rules banning all flights and vessels from some high-risk regions.

The SI related to England only; there were separate regulations for travellers to Wales, Scotland and Northern Ireland.

On 17 May 2021 the regulations were revoked and replaced by the Health Protection (Coronavirus, International Travel and Operator Liability) (England) Regulations 2021 (SI 2021/582).

== Regulations ==
=== Legal basis and commencement ===
The Health Protection (Coronavirus, International Travel) (England) Regulations 2020 (SI 2020/568) were introduced by way of a statutory instrument made by the Secretary of State for Health and Social Care, Matt Hancock, using emergency powers available to him under sections 45B, 45F(2) and 45P(2) of the Public Health (Control of Disease) Act 1984. The regulations came into effect on 8 June 2020.

=== Requirement to provide information ===
The regulations applied to most travellers who arrived in England from outside the Common Travel Area (CTA), i.e. all regions of the United Kingdom plus the Republic of Ireland, the Channel Islands and Isle of Man. Travellers were required to provide information about themselves and their intended address or addresses in England for the following 14 days. The same applied to travellers arriving from within the CTA who have been outside the CTA in the 14 days preceding their arrival.

The required information included the passenger's personal data, journey details, and details of the place they intended to self-isolate. A passenger locator form had to be completed on arrival into England, or, for passengers on the Eurotunnel Shuttle, at immigration control in Calais. Passengers could complete the form in advance as long as they provided proof of having done so if requested.

Members of diplomatic or consular missions, representatives of international organisations afforded privileges and immunities in the UK, diplomatic and consular couriers, government representatives on official business, and members of their households were exempted from the requirement to provide this information; although between 7 and 28 November 2020 this exemption was not available to any person who had been in Denmark in the 14 days before arriving in England.

By October 2020, the government concluded that the level of compliance with the requirement to provide information was "sub-optimal". The Health Protection (Coronavirus, Public Health Information for Passengers Travelling to England) (Amendment) Regulations 2020 (SI 2020/1090) placed additional requirements on travel operators to provide information to passengers, including a requirement to provide information relating to compliance with these requirements and health guidance. Such information was required to be provided to passengers within the period 24–48 hours before departure to England. From 1 February 2021, transport operators who did not ensure passengers they carried into England had completed the form could also be fined or prosecuted.

=== Requirement to self-isolate ===
SI 2020/568, as originally made, required all travellers who entered England from outside the Common Travel Area, or who had been outside the Common Travel Area in the fourteen days prior to their arrival in England, to self-isolate from others for a period of time. Amendments to the regulations (see below) varied this general requirement in respect of certain countries.

Self-isolating travellers had to go directly to the place where they were to self-isolate and remain there until the end of the 14th day after which they entered the Common Travel Area, or the date they left England. From 14 December 2020 the self-isolation period was reduced to 10 days.

Those within their periods of self-isolation could not leave or be outside the place where they were self-isolating except:

- to travel to leave England, provided they did so directly
- to seek medical assistance
- to fulfil a legal obligation such as to attend court, satisfy bail conditions, or participate in legal proceedings
- to avoid injury or illness or to escape a risk of harm
- on compassionate grounds, such as attending certain funerals
- to move to a different place of self-isolation
- in exceptional circumstances, for example to obtain basic necessities such as food or medical supplies where these could not be obtained in any other manner; to access critical public services; or to move to a different address if it became impractical to remain at the self-isolation address.

=== 'Test to release', from 15 December 2020 ===
From 15 December 2020, amendments brought in by the Health Protection (Coronavirus, International Travel) (England) (Amendment) (No. 26) Regulations 2020 (SI 2020/1337) provided a 'test to release' regime which allowed some self-isolation periods to be reduced from 10 days (previously 14 days) to five. The traveller had to take a government-validated private COVID-19 test on or after the fifth day from last being in a non-exempt country, and receive a negative result. The regime applied only to private tests, a negative result from the NHS test not counting for this purpose. Anyone who received a positive or an unclear result had to remain in self-isolation. The regulations set out rules whereby private suppliers could have their tests officially validated for use under this regime. On 17 December 2020, further requirements were imposed on private providers of COVID-19 tests by the Health Protection (Coronavirus, Testing Requirements and Standards) (England) Regulations 2020 (SI 2020/1549). From 24 December 2020, 'test to release' was disapplied to countries subject to 'additional measures'.

=== Exempt countries and territories ===
On 10 July 2020 a list of exempt countries and territories was introduced. Travellers arriving in England who in the preceding 14 days had been in or had transited only through a country or territory on the exempt list did not have to self-isolate.

The table below lists all the places which were at any point on the exempt list or which were subject to additional restrictions beyond the standard requirement to self-isolate. Travellers from any place not listed in this table had to self-isolate during the entire period the regulations were in force.

The list of countries with exemptions and additional restrictions was last amended by Health Protection (Coronavirus, International Travel) (England) (Amendment) (No. 15) Regulations 2021 (SI 2021/571), in force from 12 May 2021. Persons travelling from all countries listed in the table below ceased to be subject to these rules on the repeal of the regulations on 17 May 2021 but many were subject to continued restrictions under the newly-created the Health Protection (Coronavirus, International Travel and Operator Liability) (England) Regulations 2021 (SI 2021/582) from that date.

The colour-coding is based on the final legally-binding regulations – ignoring government 'guidelines' and political statements – as enacted prior to the repeal of the rules on 17 May 2021. These are subject to a variety of exceptions, summarised below.

Periods for which travel restrictions or exemptions applied to specific areas
Country/territory [sortable]	Dates exempt	Dates not exempt		Dates flights/vessels banned
Country/territory [sortable]	Dates exempt	Not exempt	Additional measures ('Red list')	Dates flights/vessels banned
All areas not listed below		8 June 2020–		
Scotland	Within the Common Travel Area	N/A		
Wales	Within the Common Travel Area	N/A		
Northern Ireland	Within the Common Travel Area	N/A		
Ireland, Republic of	Within the Common Travel Area	N/A		
Isle of Man	Within the Common Travel Area	N/A		
Channel Islands	Within the Common Travel Area	N/A		
Andorra	10 July 2020 – 8 August 2020	9 August 2020–		
Angola		8 June 2020–	9 Jan 2021 –	
Antigua and Barbuda	10 July 2020–18 Jan 2021	18 Jan 2021–		
Argentina		8 June 2020–	15 Jan 2021–	15 January 2021–
Aruba	10 July 2020 – 15 August 2020; 28 Nov 2020–15 Jan 2021	15 August 2020–28 Nov 2020; 16 Jan 2021–		
Australia	10 July 2020–18 Jan 2021	18 Jan 2021–		
Austria	10 July 2020 – 22 August 2020	22 August 2020–		
The Bahamas	10 July 2020 – 8 August 2020	9 August 2020–		
Bahrain	14 Nov 2020–18 Jan 2021	18 Jan 2021–		
Bangladesh		8 June 2020–	9 April 2021–	
Barbados	10 July 2020–18 Jan 2021	18 Jan 2021–		
Belgium	10 July 2020 – 8 August 2020	9 August 2020–		
Bhutan	28 November 2020–18 Jan 2021	18 Jan 2021–		
Bolivia		8 June 2020–	15 Jan 2021–	
Bonaire, Sint Eustatius and Saba	10 July 2020 – 3 Oct 2020; 21 Nov 2020–16 Jan 2021	3 Oct 2020–20 Nov 2020; 16 Jan 2021–		
Botswana	12 Dec 2020– 9 Jan 2021	10 July 2020 - 11 December 2020, 9 January 2021 -	9 Jan 2021–	
Brazil		8 June 2020–	15 Jan 2021–	15 January 2021–
Brunei	11 August 2020–18 Jan 2021	18 Jan 2021–	29 Jan 2021–	
Burundi		8 June 2020–	29 Jan 2021–	
Cambodia	14 Nov 2020–18 Jan 2021	18 Jan 2021–		
Cape Verde		8 June 2020–	15 Jan 2021–	15 January 2021–
Chile	14 Nov 2020–14 Jan 2021	10 July 2020–13 Nov 2020;, 15 January 2021 -	15 Jan 2021–	15 January 2021–
Colombia		8 June 2020–	15 Jan 2021–	
Croatia	10 July 2020 – 22 August 2020	22 August 2020–		
Cuba	29 August 2020–18 Jan 2021	18 Jan 2021–		
Curaçao	10 July 2020–26 Sept 2020	26 Sept 2020–		
Cyprus	10 July 2020–31 Oct 2020	1 Nov 2020–		
Czechia	10 July 2020 – 29 August 2020	29 August 2020–		
Denmark	10 July 2020–26 Sept 2020; 25 Oct 2020–6 Nov 2020	26 Sept 2020–25 Oct 2020; 6 Nov 2020–		
Dominica	10 July 2020–18 Jan 2021	18 Jan 2021–		
DR Congo		8 June 2020–	22 Jan 2021–	
Ecuador		8 June 2020–	15 Jan 2021–	
Estonia	28 July 2020–28 November 2020	28 November 2020–		
Eswatini		8 June 2020–	9 Jan 2021–	
Ethiopia		8 June 2020–	19 March 2021–	19 March 2021–
Faroe Islands	10 July 2020–18 Jan 2021	18 Jan 2021–		
Fiji	10 July 2020–18 Jan 2021	18 Jan 2021–		
Finland	10 July 2020–18 Jan 2021	18 Jan 2021–		
France	10 July 2020 – 15 August 2020	15 August 2020–		
French Guiana		8 June 2020–	15 Jan 2021–	
French Polynesia	10 July 2020–12 Sept 2020	12 Sept 2020–		
Germany	10 July 2020–7 Nov 2020	7 Nov 2020–		
Greece (excluding certain islands)	10 July 2020–13 Nov 2020	14 Nov 2020–		
Greece (island of Mykonos)	10 July 2020–9 Sept 2020; 25 Oct 2020–13 Nov 2020	9 Sept 2020–25 Oct 2020; 14 Nov 2020–		
Greece (island of Crete)	10 July 2020–9 Sept 2020; 18 Oct 2020–18 Jan 2021	9 Sept 2020–18 Oct 2020; 18 Jan 2021–		
Greece (islands of Lesvos, Tinos, Serifos, and Santorini)	10 July 2020–9 Sept 2020; 10 Oct 2020–13 Nov 2020	9 Sept 2020–10 Oct 2020; 14 Nov 2020–		
Greece (islands of Corfu, Kos and Rhodes)	10 July 2020–18 Jan 2021	18 Jan 2021		
Greece (island of Zakynthos)	10 July 2020–9 Sept 2020; 10 Oct 2020–18 Jan 2021	9 Sept 2020–10 Oct 2020; 18 Jan 2021–		
Greenland	10 July 2020–18 Jan 2021	18 Jan 2021–		
Grenada	10 July 2020–18 Jan 2021	18 Jan 2021–		
Guadeloupe	10 July 2020–19 Sept 2020	19 Sept 2020–		
Guyana		8 June 2020–	15 Jan 2021–	
Hong Kong	10 July 2020–18 Jan 2021	18 Jan 2021–		
Hungary	10 July 2020–12 Sept 2020	12 Sept 2020–		
Iceland	10 July 2020–26 Sept 2020; 14 Nov 2020–18 Jan 2021	26 Sept 2020–13 Nov 2020; 18 Jan 2021–		
India		8 June 2020–23 Apr 2021	23 Apr 2021–	
Israel (except Jerusalem)	21 Nov 2020–9 Jan 2021	9 Jan 2021–		
Italy	10 July 2020 – 18 October 2020	18 October 2020–		
Jamaica	10 July 2020 – 29 August 2020	29 August 2020–		
Japan	10 July 2020–18 Jan 2021	18 Jan 2021–		
Jerusalem	21 Nov 2020–9 Jan 2021	9 Jan 2021–		
Kenya		8 June 2020–	9 April 2021–	
Kiribati	28 November 2020–18 Jan 2021	18 Jan 2021–		
Laos	14 Nov 2020–18 Jan 2021	18 Jan 2021–		
Latvia	28 July 2020–28 November 2020	28 November 2020–		
Lesotho		8 June 2020–	9 Jan 2021–	
Liechtenstein	10 July 2020–25 Oct 2020	25 Oct 2020–		
Lithuania	10 July 2020–31 Oct 2020	1 Nov 2020–		
Luxembourg	10 July 2020 – 30 July 2020	31 July 2020–		
Macau	10 July 2020–18 Jan 2021	18 Jan 2021–		
Malawi		8 June 2020–	9 Jan 2021–	
Malaysia	11 August 2020–18 Jan 2021	18 Jan 2021–		
Maldives	25 Oct 2020–18 Jan 2021	18 Jan 2021–11 May 2021	12 May 2021–	12 May 2021–
Malta	10 July 2020 – 15 August 2020	15 August 2020–		
Mauritius	10 July 2020–9 Jan 2021	9 Jan 2021–	9 Jan 2021–	
Micronesia, the Federated States of	28 November 2020–18 Jan 2021	18 Jan 2021		
Monaco	10 July 2020 – 15 August 2020	15 August 2020–		
Mongolia	28 November 2020–18 Jan 2021	18 Jan 2021		
Mozambique		9 Jan 2021–	9 Jan 2021–	
Namibia	21 Nov 2020–19 December 2020	19 December 2020–;	9 Jan 2021–	
Nepal		8 June 2020–11 May 2021	12 May 2021–	
The Netherlands	10 July 2020 – 15 August 2020	15 August 2020–		
New Caledonia	10 July 2020–18 Jan 2021	18 Jan 2021		
New Zealand	10 July 2020–18 Jan 2021	18 Jan 2021–		
Norway	10 July 2020–18 Jan 2021	18 Jan 2021–		
Oman		8 June 2020–	19 March 2021–	19 March 2021–
Pakistan		8 June 2020–	9 April 2021–	
Panama		8 June 2020–	15 Jan 2021–	
Paraguay		8 June 2020–	15 Jan 2021–	
Peru		8 June 2020–	15 Jan 2021–	
Philippines		8 June 2020–	9 April 2021–	
Poland	10 July 2020 – 3 October 2020	3 October 2020–		
Portugal (except the Azores and Madeira)	22 August 2020–12 Sept 2020	12 Sept 2020–	15 Jan 2021–19 March 2021–	15 January 2021–19 March 2021–
Portugal (the Azores and Madeira)	22 August 2020–14 Jan 2021	10 July 2020 – 21 August 2020; 19 March 2021–	15 Jan 2021–19 March 2021	15 January 2021–19 March 2021
Qatar	14 Nov 2020–15 Jan 2021	10 July 2020–13 Nov 2020; 16 Jan 2021–	19 March 2021–	19 March 2021–
Réunion	10 July 2020–12 Sept 2020	12 Sept 2020–		
Rwanda	21 Nov 2020–18 Jan 2021	18 Jan 2021–	29 Jan 2021–	
Saint Barthélemy	10 July 2020–18 Jan 2021	18 Jan 2021–		
Saint Kitts and Nevis	10 July 2020–18 Jan 2021	18 Jan 2021–		
Saint Lucia	10 July 2020–18 Jan 2021	18 Jan 2021–		
Saint Pierre and Miquelon	10 July 2020–18 Jan 2021	18 Jan 2021–		
Saint Vincent and the Grenadines	28 July 2020–18 Jan 2021	18 Jan 2021–		
Samoa	28 November 2020–18 Jan 2021	18 Jan 2021–		
San Marino	10 July 2020 – 18 October 2020	18 October 2020–		
Saudi Arabia	12 Dec 2020-18 Jan 2021	18 Jan 2021–		
Serbia	10 July 2020 (only)	11 July 2020–		
Seychelles	10 July 2020–9 Jan 2021	9 Jan 2021–	9 Jan 2021–	
Singapore	19 Sept 2020–18 Jan 2021	18 Jan 2021–		
Slovakia	28 July 2020-26 Sept 2020	26 Sept 2020-		
Slovenia	28 July 2020–19 Sept 2020	19 Sept 2020–		
Solomon Islands	28 November 2020–18 Jan 2021	18 Jan 2021		
Somalia		8 June 2020–	19 March 2021–	
South Africa		8 June 2020–	23 Dec 2020–	24 Dec 2020–
South Korea	10 July 2020–18 Jan 2021	18 Jan 2021–		
Spain (except Canary Islands)	10 July 2020 – 25 July 2020	26 July 2020–		
Spain (Canary Islands)	10 July 2020 – 25 July 2020; 25 Oct 2020–12 Dec 2020	26 July 2020–24 Oct 2020; 12 Dec 2020-		
Sri Lanka	21 Nov 2020–18 Jan 2021	18 Jan 2021–		
Suriname		8 June 2020–	15 Jan 2021 –	
Sweden	12 Sept 2020–7 Nov 2020	7 Nov 2020–		
Switzerland	10 July 2020 – 29 August 2020	29 August 2020–		
Taiwan	10 July 2020–18 Jan 2021	18 Jan 2021–		
Tanzania	10 July 2020–	22 Jan 2021–	22 Jan 2021–	
Thailand	19 Sept 2020–18 Jan 2021	18 Jan 2021–		
Timor-Leste	28 November 2020–18 Jan 2021	18 Jan 2021–		
Tonga	28 November 2020–18 Jan 2021	18 Jan 2021–		
Trinidad and Tobago	10 July 2020 – 22 August 2020	22 August 2020–		
Turkey	10 July 2020 – 3 October 2020	3 October 2020–11 May 2021	12 May 2021–	12 May 2021–
United Arab Emirates	14 Nov 2020–12 January 2021	12 January 2021–	29 Jan 2021–	29 Jan 2021–
United States of America (except Northern Mariana Islands and Virgin Islands)		8 June 2020–		
United States of America (Northern Mariana Islands)	21 Nov 2020–18 Jan 2021	18 Jan 2021–		
United States Virgin Islands	21 Nov 2020–19 December 2020	19 December 2020–		
Uruguay	21 Nov 2020–19 December 2020	19 December 2020–;	15 Jan 2021–	
Vanuatu	28 November 2020–18 Jan 2021	18 Jan 2021–		
Vatican City State	10 July 2020 – 18 October 2020	18 October 2020–		
Venezuela		8 June 2020–	15 Jan 2021–	
Vietnam	10 July 2020–18 Jan 2021	18 Jan 2021–		
Zambia		8 June 2020–	9 Jan 2021–	
Zimbabwe		8 June 2020–	9 Jan 2021–	
Anguilla *	10 July 2020–18 Jan 2021	18 Jan 2021–		
Bermuda *	10 July 2020–18 Jan 2021	18 Jan 2021–		
British Antarctic Territory *	10 July 2020–18 Jan 2021	18 Jan 2021–		
British Indian Ocean Territory *	10 July 2020–18 Jan 2021	18 Jan 2021–		
British Virgin Islands *	10 July 2020–18 Jan 2021	18 Jan 2021–		
Cayman Islands *	10 July 2020–18 Jan 2021	18 Jan 2021–		
Cyprus Sovereign Base Areas *	10 July 2020–13 Nov 2020	14 Nov 2020–		
Falkland Islands *	10 July 2020–18 Jan 2021	18 Jan 2021–		
Gibraltar *	10 July 2020–18 Jan 2021	18 Jan 2021–		
Montserrat *	10 July 2020–18 Jan 2021	18 Jan 2021–		
Pitcairn, Henderson, Ducie and Oeno Islands *	10 July 2020–18 Jan 2021	18 Jan 2021–		
Saint Helena, Ascension and Tristan da Cunha *	10 July 2020–18 Jan 2021	18 Jan 2021–		
South Georgia and the South Sandwich Islands *	10 July 2020–18 Jan 2021	18 Jan 2021–		
Turks and Caicos Islands *	10 July 2020 – 15 August 2020; 14 Nov 2020–18 Jan 2021	15 August 2020–13 Nov 2020		

Travellers entering England from any place not listed in this table had to self-isolate.

Key (based on the latest enforceable regulations)
No self-isolation. Country is in the Common Travel Area, so the regulations did not apply.
No self-isolation, but had to possess a negative test result. There were no countries where this applied as at 17 May 2021
Self-isolation required. Had possess a negative test result. Was previously exempt. Could use "test to release" on the fifth day after arriving
Red list countries: mandatory hotel isolation required at approved quarantine accommodation for at least 10 days. Had to arrive via an approved airport, with both accommodation and COVID-19 tests for days 2 and 8 pre-booked
Arrival of all flights/vessels banned
* indicates a British Overseas Territory

=== Transitional rules ===
A passenger who arrived in the UK from a country which was later removed from the exemption list did not then need to self-isolate. A passenger who arrived in the UK from a country which later became exempt still had to complete their 14-day self-isolation.

=== Exempt classes of traveller ===
Certain classes of traveller, particularly those who need to cross the border for work purposes, were exempt from self-isolation or subject to modified requirements. These included, subject to a complex variety of conditions:

- transit passengers, and those travelling to receive healthcare
- people who cross the border at least weekly to travel between work and home
- seasonal farm workers
- healthcare professionals (until 30 July only)
- healthcare couriers, and those involved in clinical trials
- road haulage workers and road passenger transit workers
- mariners, air crew and tunnel workers
- essential government contractors, and other essential and emergency workers
- oil and gas, nuclear, aerospace and space workers
- postal operators
- repatriated prisoners, extradited persons, and their escorts

From 7 July 2020:

- elite sportspeople travelling for a specified sports event, and their support teams
- persons engaged in film or high end TV production (until 18 January 2021 only)

From 26 September 2020 to 18 January 2021:

- directors and actors engaged in audiovisual advertisement production

From 17 November 2020 to 9 January 2021:

- seasonal poultry workers who self-isolate at their accommodation or place of work

From 21 November 2020:

- Crown contractors, workers on essential state business, people facilitating diplomatic missions, certified emergency workers, subsea fibre optic cable workers

From 5 December 2020 to 18 January 2021:

- persons engaged in TV production, journalists and performing arts professionals. Also, certain senior executives who believed that their physical presence in England would, more likely than not, lead to the creation or saving of at least 50 jobs or a contract worth at least £100 million.

From 5 December 2020:

- newly signed elite athletes

From 19 December 2020

- persons carrying out work designated as essential by the Secretary of State for Transport, including the high speed 2 rail project.

Intended to be from 15 January 2021, but revoked before the exemption came into effect:

- workers dealing with flower bulbs and ornamental flowers

From 20 February 2021:

- Arrivals who were exempt from self-isolation for work/elite sports reasons were required self-isolate except when they were actually carrying out the relevant work/activity

=== Special rules for high risk countries ===
Starting from 7 November 2020, additional stricter requirements were applied to passengers arriving from certain high-risk countries. These were variously referred to as "additional measures", and the "red list".

==== Denmark (7–28 November 2020) ====
Following the Cluster 5 mutation of COVID-19 in Denmark in November 2020, special restrictions were applied to travel from that country. From 7 November 2020, all exemptions from completing the passenger locator form and from self-isolation ceased to apply to anyone arriving from Denmark, and a requirement to self-isolate for 14 days was extended to anyone in the same household as a traveller who had been in Denmark. A ban on entry to the UK on all travellers from Denmark (except hauliers and British citizens and residents) was also announced. From 8 November, passenger flights and vessels departing Denmark were banned from landing in England except in an emergency. An exemption was added on 14 November covering professional sportspeople and their support teams arriving in connection with certain football matches. On 28 November 2020, all of the additional Denmark-specific restrictions were revoked.

==== 'Additional measures' (23 December 2020 – 15 February 2021) ====
From the end of December, more restrictive 'additional measures' started to be selectively applied to certain countries and regions. These additional measures required non-exempted arrivals who had been in or transited through any 'additional measures' country during the preceding 14 days, along with members of their households, to self-isolate for 10 days. The "Test to Release" option was not available for those people.

Hauliers who had been in Portugal only (including the Azores and Madeira), but not the other listed countries, were exempt.

==== Red list countries and hotel quarantine (from 15 February 2021) ====
On 15 February 2021 the 'additional measures' rules were significantly tightened, and the 'additional measures' countries became officially known as the 'red list'. From that date, non-exempted international travellers who had been in or transited through any red list country during the preceding 10 days were permitted to enter England only via one of the approved airports, namely Heathrow, Gatwick, London City, Birmingham and Farnborough, Bristol (from 24 April 2021), or via any military airfield or port.

In accordance with previous rules, the traveller was required to be in possession on arrival of a notification of a negative COVID-19 test result. In addition, such passengers now also had to be in possession of a booking for approved quarantine accommodation, a booking for approved transport to that accommodation, and a 'testing package' comprising bookings for COVID-19 tests at days 2 and 8 after arrival. Certain 'reasonable excuses' for non-compliance were accepted, including disability, urgent medical treatment, and lack of access to booking facilities in the departure and transit countries.

At the quarantine accommodation, the traveller had to isolate for at least 10 days, and undergo the day 2 and day 8 tests in good time, although replacement tests were allowed for with 'reasonable excuse'. If either were missed, or did not return a negative result, the quarantine period was extended. The tests could be undertaken either by a private provider or (for an official fee) by a public provider.

Travellers who were required to isolate could do so together with anyone with whom they were travelling. They could not leave the designated accommodation except:

- to travel directly to a port to leave the Common Travel Area
- to fulfil a legal obligation
- to take exercise
- to visit a dying person or attend a funeral
- in other exceptional circumstances such as medical assistance, to access critical public services, to escape risk of harm
- to access urgent veterinary services.

Leaving for the purpose of exercise, to visit a dying person or attend a funeral required prior permission from an authorised person.

Police officers and other officially authorised persons were empowered to enforce the regulations to direct the traveller to travel to and remain in the accommodation, to remove the traveller to the accommodation, to require the production of papers, to detain for up to three hours, to carry out personal (non-intimate) searches of the person and baggage, and to seize articles found.

Police officers were also given the power to enter premises to search for persons suspected of illegally avoiding isolation, and to remove them (using force if necessary) to their designated accommodation.

=== Arrivals banned ===
Flights and vessels arriving in England from certain high-risk areas were halted at various times by the regulations, the first instance being the banning of flights from Denmark between 7 and 28 November 2020.

From 24 December 2020:

Direct passenger flights from South Africa were banned. Exemptions applied to UK government planes or vessels, emergency landings, and air ambulances.

From 15 January 2021:

Direct passenger flights from Argentina, Brazil, Cape Verde, Chile, and Portugal were banned, as were ferries or other passenger vessels arriving from Portugal. Exemptions applied to UK government planes or vessels, emergency landings or moorings, and air ambulances.

=== Requirement for negative coronavirus test ===
The Regulations were amended with effect from 15 January 2021 by SI 2021/38. From that date, a passenger arriving in England from outside the Common Travel Area had to possess a notification of a negative COVID-19 test from a sample taken no more than three days before they departed for the UK, unless exempt. NHS tests were not accepted.

Exemptions applied to:

- Children aged under 11
- Those in certain professions:
  - Border and customs officials
  - Channel Tunnel system workers
  - Hauliers
  - Air, maritime, and rail crew
  - Civil aviation inspectors
  - Travellers transporting human cells or blood products
  - Seamen and masters, inspectors, and surveyors of ships
- Travellers returning from conducting essential state business or essential, emergency, or policing work outside the UK and having a certificate of exemption from their department
- Foreign diplomats or government officials travelling on official business and holding exemption certificates from the Foreign Commonwealth and Development Office
- Workers with certain specialist technical skills.

Travellers had a 'reasonable excuse' not to possess a negative COVID-19 test if one of the following applied:

- The traveller was medically unfit to undergo a test and possessed a medical certificate to that effect
- It was not reasonably practicable for the traveller to obtain a test owing to a disability
- The traveller required medical treatment with such urgency that obtaining a test was not reasonably practicable
- The traveller contracted coronavirus and required emergency medical treatment
- The traveller was accompanying a traveller requiring emergency treatment and obtaining a test was not reasonably practicable
- The traveller originated in a country or territory where tests were not available or it was not reasonably practicable to obtain one there or at any transfer point
- The traveller's journey to their last departure point to England took so long that it was not reasonably practicable to obtain a test in the three days prior to departure, nor at any transfer point.

=== Tests after arrival ===
From 15 February 2021, travellers aged 5 and up arriving in England from outside the Common Travel Area, or arriving having been outside the Common Travel Area in the preceding 10 days, were required to purchase a testing package, consisting of a day 2 test and a day 8 test. The day 2 test had to be taken on or before the second full day after arrival in England, and the day 8 test had to be taken on or after the eighth full day after arrival. Unless the traveller was in a 'managed self-isolation facilit'y (government-approved accommodation), they could use the "test to release" option as before. If a test was missed, the self-isolation period was extended from 10 days to 14. A positive test resulted in the traveller and anyone else self-isolating with them being required to self-isolate for 10 days from the date of the test, and they became prohibited from leaving the country for that time. If the day 2 and day 8 tests were both negative, the traveller could leave self-isolation after completing the 10 full days, or when they received the negative day 8 result if later.

=== Offences and enforcement ===
The regulations created the new offences of:

- Failing to complete the passenger locator form
- Failing to self-isolate as required
- Failing to comply with an authorised person's direction
- Providing false or misleading passenger information
- Obstructing a person carrying out a function under the regulations.

Enforcement of the regulations was in the hands of the police and immigration officers. Breaches of the regulations attracted a fixed penalty notice. Breaches relating to self-isolation initially attracted a fixed penalty of £1,000, later increased to an amount on sliding scale between £1000 and £10,000. Breaches relating to the provision of information attracted a penalty of £100 for the first offence, increasing on a sliding scale to £3,200; with effect from 18 January 2021 this was increased to £500 to £4,000. Offenders could alternatively face prosecution.

From 15 January 2021:

- Failing to provide a clear COVID-19 test on arrival in the UK

From 1 February 2021:

- Transport operator failing to verify passengers' locator forms or COVID-19 test certificates

From 15 February 2021:

- Breaches of the mandatory hotel quarantine rules. Wilful obstruction of anyone carrying out the regulations: fixed penalties of between £5000 and £10,000.

=== Review and revocation ===
The regulations had to be reviewed every 28 days (originally 21). They were initially set to expire on 7 June 2021, but in the event were revoked and replaced on 17 May 2021 by the Health Protection (Coronavirus, International Travel and Operator Liability) (England) Regulations 2021 (SI 2021/582).

== List of amendments by date ==
The regulations were amended numerous times. The first amendment, the Health Protection (Coronavirus, International Travel and Public Health Information) (England) (Amendment) Regulations 2020 (SI 2020/691), introduced the list of exempt countries and territories with effect from 10 July.

Amendments
SI No.	Amend. No.	Made	Effective from	Summary of major changes	Link
Amendments made in 2020
691	1	6 July	7 July	Added exemptions from self-isolation for certain professions and sportspeople attending prescribed events; changed review frequency to every 28 days	
691	1	6 July	10 July	Created the exempt country list	
724	2	10 July	11 July	Removed Serbia from exempt list	
799	3	23 July	28 July	Added Estonia, Latvia, St. Vincent and the Grenadines, Slovakia, and Slovenia to exempt list	
805	4	25 July	26 July	Removed Spain from exempt list	
813	5	29 July	30 July	Added permission for visitors providing emergency, medical, or veterinary assistance, personal care, or critical personal services to visit someone who is self-isolating; removed exemption from self-isolation for medical and care professionals entering the UK; added additional specified sports events	
819	6	30 July	31 July	Removed Luxembourg from exempt list	
841	7	7 August	9 August	Removed Andorra, the Bahamas, and Belgium from exempt list	
841	7	7 August	11 August	Added Brunei and Malaysia to exempt list	
866	8	14 August	15 August	Removed Aruba, France, Malta, Monaco, the Netherlands, and Turks and Caicos Islands from exempt list; added additional specified sports events	
881	9	20 August	N/A	Removed Austria, Croatia, and Trinidad and Tobago from exempt list, and added Portugal; added an additional specified sports event. Revoked by SI 2020/890 before it entered into force	
890	10	21 August	22 August	Revoked the Amendment (No. 9) Regulations due to a clerical error; and re-applied the same amendments	
913	11	28 August	29 August	Removed Czechia, Jamaica, and Switzerland from exempt list and added Cuba; reworded the requirement to provide a residence address; updated the list of specified sports events	
959	12	8 Sept	9 Sept	Allowed for different rules for parts of countries; added self-isolation requirement for travellers from the Greek islands of Lesvos, Tinos, Serifos, Crete, Mykonos, Santorini and Zakynthos	
980	13	11 Sept	12 Sept	Removed French Polynesia, Hungary, mainland Portugal, and Réunion from exempt list; added Sweden	
1013	14	18 Sept	19 Sept	Removed Guadeloupe and Slovenia from exempt list; added Singapore and Thailand	
1039	15	24 Sept	26 Sept	Removed Curaçao, Denmark, Iceland, and Slovakia from exempt list; added exemptions from self-isolation for elite sportspeople attending medicals, support staff of elite sportspeople, those involved in advertising production	
1070	16	30 Sept	2 Oct	Increased the penalty for breach of isolation to an amount on sliding scale between £1000 and £10,000. Provided for a situation where a person is self-isolating for other reasons	
1076	17	2 Oct	3 Oct	Removed Bonaire, Sint Eustatius and Saba, Poland, and Turkey from exempt list	
1094	18	8 Oct	10 Oct	Added the Greek islands of Lesvos, Tinos, Serifos, Santorini and Zakynthos to the exempt list	
1129	19	16 Oct	18 Oct	Added Crete to the exempt list; removed Italy, San Marino and Vatican City State	
1161	20	23 Oct	25 Oct	Added Mykonos (Greece), The Canary Islands, Denmark and The Maldives to the exempt list; removed Liechtenstein	
1190	21	29 Oct	1 Nov	Removed Cyprus and Lithuania from exempt list; updated the list of prescribed sporting events	
1227	22	6 Nov	6 Nov	Removed Denmark from exempt list	
1227	22	6 Nov	7 Nov	Removed Germany and Sweden from exempt list	
1238	23	7 Nov	7 Nov	The list of exempt classes of traveller no longer applies to anyone arriving from Denmark; anyone who lives with an arrival from Denmark is also required to self-isolate	
1239	–	8 Nov	8 Nov	Most aircraft and vessels from Denmark are prohibited	
1277	–	12 Nov	14 Nov	Removed mainland Greece and some islands as well as the sovereign base areas in Cyprus from the exempt list; added Bahrain, Cambodia, Chile, Iceland, Laos, Qatar, and the UAE to the exempt list, introduced an exemption from the Denmark self-isolation rules for footballers playing in two named matches and associated ancillary staff, allowed planes from Denmark to land if carrying these people or for refuelling, or maintenance; allowed air ambulances to land from Denmark	
1292	24	16 Nov	17 Nov	Allowed seasonal poultry workers to self-isolate at their accommodation and place of work	
1323	25	19 Nov	21 Nov	Added Bonaire, Sint Eustatius and Saba, Israel, Jerusalem, Namibia, Northern Mariana Islands, Rwanda, Sri Lanka, Uruguay and US Virgin Islands to the exempt list; widened the exemptions for crown servants and government contractors travelling on essential government business; widened the exemption for communications workers; updated the list of approved sports events	
1337	26	23 Nov	15 Dec	Introduced 'test to release' rules, providing for some self-isolation periods to be reduced from 14 to five days	
1360	27	26 Nov	28 Nov	Repealed additional restrictions on travellers from Denmark; added Aruba, Bhutan, Kiribati, Mongolia, the Federated States of Micronesia, Samoa, Solomon Islands, Timor-Leste, Tonga and Vanuatu to the exempt list; removed Estonia and Latvia from the exempt list	
1424	28	3 Dec	5 Dec	Added exemptions to isolation for people engaged in TV production, newly signed elite athletes, journalists, performing arts professionals, and certain senior executives.	
1517	–	10 Dec	14 Dec	Reduced self-isolation period to 10 days	
1517	–	10 Dec	12 Dec	Added Botswana and Saudi Arabia to the exempt list, and removed the Canary Islands	
1595	29	17 Dec	19 Dec	Removed Namibia, the United States Virgin Islands and Uruguay from the exempt list	
1644	–	23 Dec	23 & 24 Dec	Most aircraft arrivals from South Africa prohibited; apply 'additional measures' to arrivals who have been in South Africa: both they and members of their household must self-isolate for 10 days, and may not use the “Test to Release” option	
Amendments made in 2021
18	1	7 Jan	9 Jan	Removed Botswana, Israel, Jerusalem, Mauritius and the Seychelles from exempt list, applied 'additional measures' to Angola, Botswana, Eswatini, Lesotho, Malawi, Mauritius, Mozambique, Namibia, Seychelles, Zambia and Zimbabwe, amended the list of approved sports events	
25	2	11 Jan	12 Jan	Removed UAE from exempt list	
38	–	14 Jan	15 Jan	All arrivals must possess notification of a negative COVID test result	
38	–	14 Jan	1 Feb	Carriers bringing passengers to the UK liable to £2,000 fine for not verifying passengers' locator forms or negative COVID-19 test results	
47	3	15 Jan	15 Jan	Chile, Madeira, and the Azores moved from exempt to additional measures; the remainder of South America and Panama placed on additional measures; flights and ferries from certain countries on additional measures banned from landing in England	
47	3	15 Jan	16 Jan	Aruba, Bonaire, Sint Eustatius & Saba, and Qatar removed from exempt list	
47	3	15 Jan	18 Jan	Starting fine for failure to complete passenger locator form increased to £500, maximum fine £4,000	
49	4	15 Jan	18 Jan	Arrivals from all countries (except those in the Common Travel Area) must self-isolate on arrival. Several classes of traveller removed from the list of people who are exempt	
68	–	21 Jan	22 Jan	Tanzania and the Democratic Republic of the Congo added to additional measures. Minor amendments to passenger information requirements and information required to be supplied by carriers to passengers	
98	5	28 Jan	29 Jan	Burundi, Rwanda and United Arab Emirates added to additional measures. Flights from UAE banned	
137	6	9 Feb	11 Feb	Removed some exemptions for elite sportspersons; amended the list of approved sports events	
150	7	12 Feb	15 Feb	Mandatory hotel isolation for 10 days or more required for arrivals from 'additional measures' (red list) countries. Must arrive via an approved airport, with accommodation pre-booked. All non-CTA arrivals must pre-book day 2 and day 8 tests. Police given new powers of entry to find people who are unlawfully outside place of quarantine	
166	8	18 Feb	20 Feb	Arrivals who are exempt from self-isolation for work/elite sports reasons must now self-isolate except when they are actually carrying out the relevant work/activity	
223	9	2 Mar	3 & 4 Mar	New rules covering unaccompanied children and those attending a boarding school in England. Private suppliers of self-isolation packages must inform the government of the date the purchaser will arrive	
252	–	5 Mar	9 Mar	Broadened definition of exempt air crew; amended the list of approved sports events	
348	10	18 Mar	19 Mar	Portugal, The Azores, Madeira and Mauritius removed from red list and arrival ban. Ethiopia, Oman, Qatar and Somalia added.	
442	11	1 Apr	6 Apr	New self-isolation regime for road hauliers, and system of workplace testing	
447	12	6 Apr	9 Apr	Bangladesh, Kenya, Pakistan and Philippines added to additional measures	
452	–	7 Apr	10 Apr	Updated the list of approved sports events	
498	13	21 Apr	23 Apr	Arrangements for G7 summit meeting; added Bristol to list of approved airports; visa-holders arriving to take up work as an NHS nurse subject to less strict measures	
498	13	21 Apr	24 Apr	Added India to red list	
555	14	7 May	8 May	Updated the list of approved sports events	
571	15	11 May	12 May	Added Maldives, Nepal, and Turkey to the red list; prohibited direct flights from Maldives and Turkey and boats from Turkey	

== External matters ==
=== Enforcement in practice ===
Although the police were from the first empowered to enforce the regulations, the Commissioner of the Metropolitan Police Cressida Dick stated on 14 May 2020 that officers in her force would not do so. As of 14 August 2020, nine fixed penalty notices had been issued at the border for failure or refusal to complete the passenger locator form.

=== Notice of changes to the exempt countries ===
Many removals of countries from the exempt list took effect only at very short notice. When the Health Protection (Coronavirus, International Travel) (England) (Amendment) (No. 8) Regulations 2020 (SI 2020/866) were announced late on Thursday 13 August to take effect from 04:00 British Summer Time on Saturday 15 August, a substantial number of British holidaymakers then in France were faced with the choice of rushing back to the UK on Friday or serving a 14-day self-isolation. The rush generated substantial demand for cross-Channel ferry crossings, Eurotunnel and Eurostar services, and even private jets.

=== Challenge to the regulations ===
In September 2020, an English-resident property developer who had been on holiday in Croatia took sought judicial review of the decisions of the Secretary of State for Health and Social Care and the Secretary of State for Transport, claiming that the Health Protection (Coronavirus, International Travel) (England) Regulations 2020 and the Health Protection (Coronavirus, International Travel) (England) (Amendment) (No. 10) Regulations 2020 (SI 2020/890) were unlawful.

== See also ==
- Health Protection (Coronavirus, Restrictions) (No. 2) (England) Regulations 2020
