= Travel during the COVID-19 pandemic =

Restrictions by countries intended to stop spread of disease

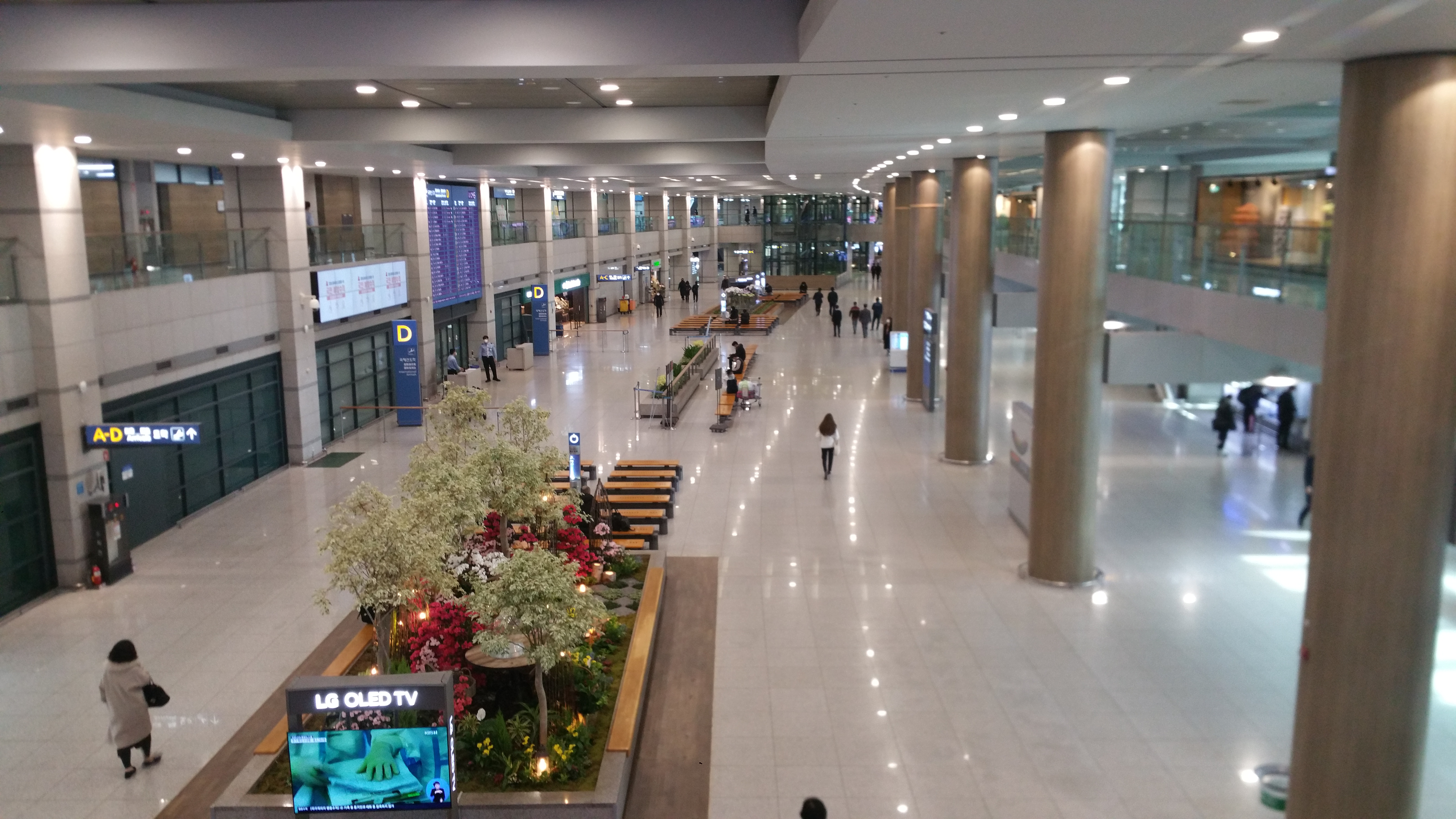
The near-empty arrival hall of Seoul–Incheon International Airport in South Korea on 6 March 2020

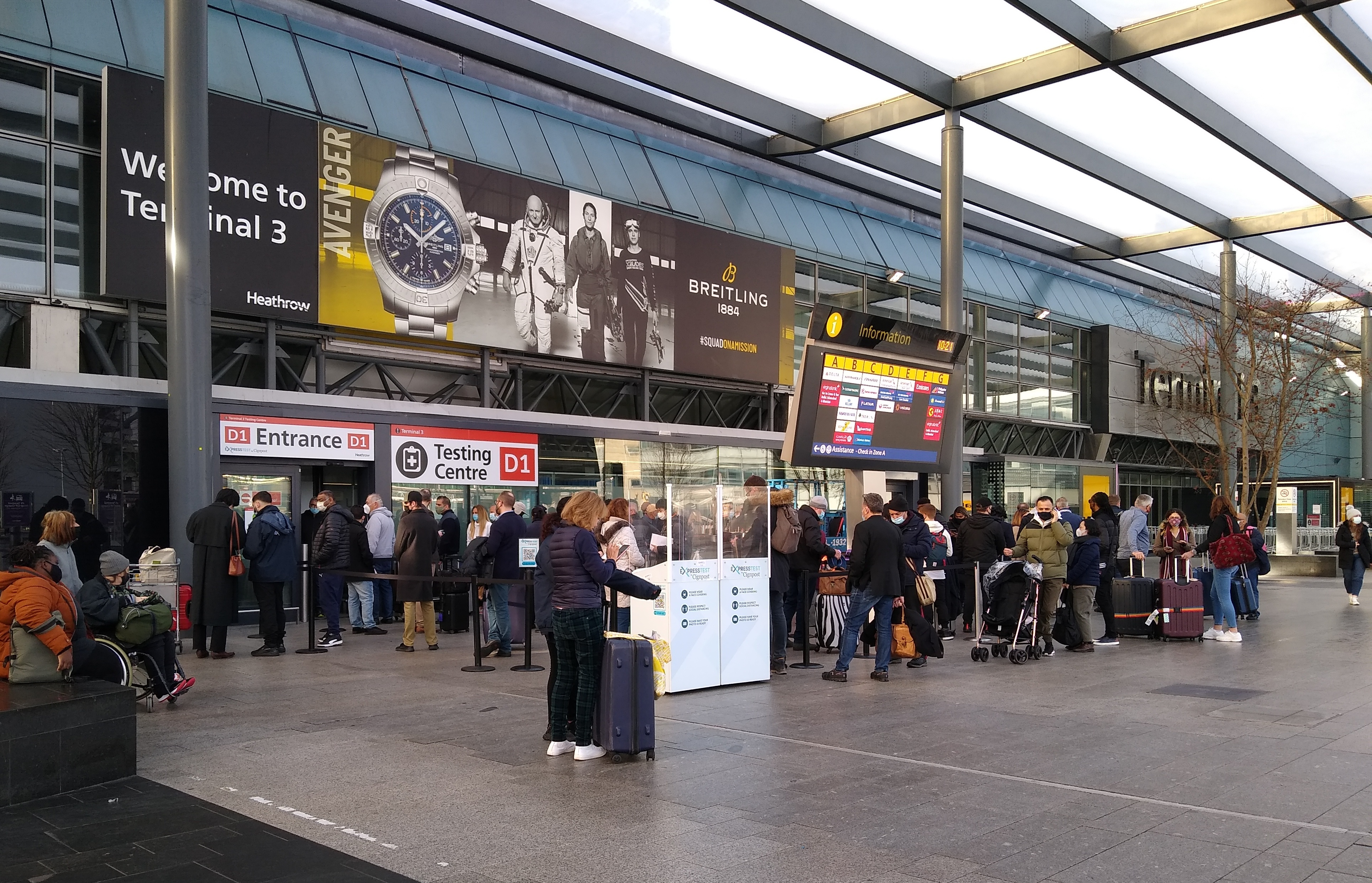
A COVID-19 testing centre for travellers at Heathrow Airport

During the COVID-19 pandemic, many countries and territories imposed quarantines, entry bans, or other travel restrictions for citizens of or recent travelers to the most affected areas. Some countries and territories imposed global restrictions that apply to all foreign countries and territories, or prevented their own citizens from travelling overseas.

Travel restrictions reduced the spread of the virus. However, because they were implemented after community transmission had begun in several countries around the globe, they produced only a modest reduction in the total number of infections. Travel restrictions may be most important at the start and end of a pandemic.

The travel restrictions brought a significant economic cost to the global tourism industry through lost income and social impacts on people who were unable to travel internationally. After travel bans lifted, global tourism saw a return to pre-pandemic levels by the end of 2024. However, some travel, especially business travel, may decrease in the long-term as lower cost alternatives, such as teleconferencing and virtual events have gained preference in the professional world. Some countries with large domestic markets, such as the United States, were able to see a faster recovery from increased domestic travel.

== Effectiveness ==
A study in Science found that travel restrictions could delay the initial arrival of COVID-19 in a country but had only modest overall effects unless combined with infection prevention and control measures to significantly reduce transmission. These findings are consistent with prior research on influenza and other communicable diseases. Travel bans may be most effective for isolated locations, such as small island nations.

Researchers came to the conclusion that "travel restrictions are most useful in the early and late phase of an epidemic" and "restrictions of travel from Wuhan unfortunately came too late".

== Effects ==
Together with a decreased willingness to travel, the restrictions have had a negative economic and social impact on the travel sector in their regions. During the pandemic, "slow travel" grew in popularity as tourists opted to avoid crowded destinations, instead taking their time to explore less well-known locations.

A possible long-term impact has been a decline of business travel and international conferencing, and the rise of their virtual, online equivalents. Concerns have been raised over the effectiveness of travel restrictions to contain the spread of COVID-19.

=== Traveling to vaccinated venues that mandate COVID-19 vaccines to tourists/staff ===
Many tourism venues, including museums, visitor centers, restaurants, and hotels, required COVID-19 vaccination for their staff or visitors, designating them as "vaccinated venues". Research indicates that tourists have differing beliefs about the effectiveness and side effects of COVID-19 vaccines, which influence their willingness to visit or use these venues.

== Countries and territories which implemented a global travel ban ==
=== Africa ===
- Algeria: All international flights to Algeria were suspended. Effective 20 March 2022, people may enter Algeria unrestricted if fully vaccinated, or have received a negative COVID-19 test.
- The Gambia: The sole land border with Senegal was closed, along with its airspace to most flights. All COVID-19 related travel restrictions have since been removed.
- Madagascar: Madagascar suspended all flights with the exception of medical evacuations, repatriations outside of the country, and cargo shipments. Most COVID-19 related travel restrictions have since been removed, as of June 2022. Tourists are still required to have a negative COVID-19 test upon arrival.
- Mali: On 18 March 2020, President Ibrahim Boubacar Keita suspended flights from affected countries, closed schools, and banned large public gatherings.
- Morocco: On 15 March 2020, Morocco suspended all international passenger flights to and from the country.
- Sudan: Effective 17 March 2020, Sudan declared a state of emergency and closed all airports and land borders.

=== Americas ===
- Montserrat: During the pandemic, passengers were not allowed to enter Montserrat. In 2022, borders were reopened to international travel.
- Suriname: Closed its borders for all persons and flights starting 14 March 2020.
- Trinidad and Tobago: On 23 March 2020, Trinidad and Tobago closed its borders to everyone, but began processing exemptions for Trinidad & Tobago citizens and permanent residents. International borders in Trinidad and Tobago remained closed at least until 30 April 2021.
- Venezuela: Borders closed to non-residents, effective 10 April 2020. This excludes humanitarian, medevac, and repatriation flights.

=== Asia ===
- Azerbaijan: Effective 23 March 2020, passengers are not allowed to enter Azerbaijan except passengers with a work permit and passengers with a special permission issued by the government of Azerbaijan.
- Bhutan: Effective 24 March 2020, all foreign nationals were prohibited from entering Bhutan through any border checkpoints.
- Brunei: Effective 24 March 2020, all foreigners were not allowed to enter Brunei through any border checkpoints, including those for transit purposes.
- Cambodia: Foreign nationals were not allowed to enter Cambodia.
- India: Flights to India were suspended on 22 March 2020. This did not apply to flights that carried goods for trade or essential goods and supplies, and their crew members, helpers, cleaners, etc.
- Indonesia: Effective 1 April 2020, all foreigners (except residents, family connections, medical personnel, and people responsible for transport of goods) were not allowed to enter Indonesia through any border checkpoints, including those for transit purposes.
- Iran: Closed its borders to all non-residents, the Iranian Ministry of Foreign Affairs (MFA) had halted permits for all tourist, business, and medical visas.
- Israel: Effective 28 November 2021, Israel closed its borders again for foreigners due to the Omicron variant.
- Japan: Effective 28 December 2020, Japan closed its borders to all non-residents. On 29 November 2021, Japan also closed its borders to business travellers and foreign students due to the Omicron variant.
- Kazakhstan: Kazakhstan initially restricted the entry of most foreign nationals before resuming commercial flights with limited capacity. As of 10 October 2020, Kazakhstan has suspended visa-free entry to all foreign nationals. Certain foreign nationals in possession of a valid visa, however, are allowed to enter Kazakhstan, amongst them: students attending higher education institutions in Kazakhstan, permanent residents, crews, immediate family members of citizens or permanent residents of Kazakhstan, certain medical personnel, and foreign diplomats. Citizens of Kazakhstan are allowed to enter without restrictions, but are allowed to leave only to designated countries. A negative result on a COVID-19 PCR test taken within 72 hours of arrival to the border inspection checkpoint of Kazakhstan is required for all passengers travelling to Kazakhstan. Citizens of Kazakhstan arriving without proof of negative PCR test were subject to quarantine at a government-approved institution, foreign nationals were subject to same-day deportation.
- Kuwait: Effective 13 March 2020, Kuwait closed its borders to all non-residents.
- Laos: Closed its borders to all non-residents. All flights to Laos and visa applications were suspended.
- Malaysia: All citizens were prohibited from leaving the country while foreigners were prohibited from entering the country effective 18 March 2020. Malaysians were allowed to return to the country.
- Mongolia: Effective 12 March 2020, non-citizens were prohibited to enter. As of 21 August 2020, a total entry ban is in place.
- Myanmar: Closed its borders to all non-residents. All flights to Myanmar and visa applications were suspended. Also, due to Myanmar coup d'état, all flights to the country are cancelled.
- North Korea: Closed its borders to all international tourists on 21 January 2020, one of the first countries to do so. All air and train routes into and out of the country were temporarily suspended, and its border with mainland China was further tightened or closed.
- Palestine: Tourist ban of the West Bank from 5 March 2020.
- Philippines: Visa issuance and visa-free entry for all foreign nationals was temporarily suspended on 19 March 2020. As of 22 March, all foreign visitors were barred from entry, with exceptions for foreign spouses and children of Filipino citizens, diplomatic officials, and workers for international organizations. Foreigners with long term visas will be allowed entry with restriction starting 1 August 2020.
- Timor-Leste: Timor-Leste had restricted the entry of all travelers except for nationals and residents of Timor-Leste.
- Turkmenistan: Starting 20 March 2020, the national border of Turkmenistan was restricted to foreign citizens and stateless persons.
- Vietnam: Effective 22 March 2020, entry of all foreigners was suspended. Visa applications were also suspended with a small number of exceptions for diplomats on official business.
- Yemen: On 17 March 2020, Yemen suspended all flights and closed land crossings.

=== Oceania ===
- Marshall Islands: Passengers were not allowed to enter Marshall Islands until 31 May 2021.
- New Caledonia: Passengers except parents of a French minor and spouses of a national of France were not allowed to enter New Caledonia.
- Fiji: Borders were closed to all non-citizens.
- French Polynesia: As of 3 February 2021, borders of French Polynesia were closed once again.
- Tuvalu: Tuvalu's borders were closed.
- Vanuatu: Vanuatu ports of entry were closed on 20 March 2020.

== Non-global restrictions ==
Just under a quarter of all countries (45) have implemented measures that affect citizens of, or recent travellers to, a particular country or set of countries. Many of these countries later expanded their restrictions, with some later implementing global restrictions.

=== Americas ===
- Aruba: As of 1 July 2020, Aruba has reopened borders for citizens of the Caribbean, Europe, United States and Canada.
- Guadeloupe: As of 1 July 2020, citizens of all nations are permitted to enter Guadeloupe for tourism with the exception of: USA, Brazil, India, Israel, Russia, and Turkmenistan.
- Peru: After a 7-month lockdown, Peru reopened its international borders on 5 October 2020 for tourism to Bolivia, Chile, Colombia, Ecuador, Panama, Paraguay, and Uruguay.

=== Asia ===
- China: Foreign nationals can travel to China if they meet one of the following requirements: holding a valid Chinese residence permit for work, personal matters or reunion, holding Diplomatic, Service or Courtesy visa issued after 28 March 2020. All travelers must present two negative tests - PCR and antibody tests, taken within 48 hours of travel to obtain a green Health Code for boarding.
- Hong Kong: Closed its borders to all non-residents on 24 March 2020. Non-Hong Kong residents arriving from mainland China, Macau and Taiwan who have not been in any overseas countries/territories in the past 14 days are exempted from the ban, but they are still subject to compulsory quarantine for 14 days as other arrivals to Hong Kong. Since Chinese tourists are only allowed to stay in Hong Kong with a valid visa for maximum 7 days, they are also banned from entering the territory. Effective 25 March 2020, all persons arriving in Hong Kong, regardless of whether they are Hong Kong residents, are subject to compulsory quarantine. As of 25 December 2020, compulsory quarantine at designated hotels had been extended to 21 days, from 14 days.
- Macau: Entry denied to all travellers except residents of mainland China, Hong Kong, Macau or Taiwan. As of 21 November 2020, people visiting Macau from most locations – except those coming from the mainland or Taiwan – will be required to undergo a 21-day medical observation upon arrival versus the previously mandated 14 days. As of 23 December 2020, residents from mainland China, Hong Kong and Taiwan who have travelled overseas in the 21 days prior to their arrival will also be denied entry.
- Singapore: All foreigners were prohibited entry and transit starting from 23 March 2020 to 19 October 2021. As of 29 November 2021, Singapore is open for vaccinated tourists from the following countries: Australia, Brunei Darussalam, Canada, Denmark, Finland, France, Germany, India, Indonesia, Italy, Malaysia, the Netherlands, the Republic of Korea, Spain, Sweden, Switzerland, the United Kingdom and the United States.
- Taiwan: Foreign nationals are now permitted to enter Taiwan, with the exception of tourist visitors. As of 25 February 2021, all inbound and transit travelers are required to provide a COVID-19 RT-PCR negative test report issued within three working days of their incoming flight's scheduled departure time. Travelers also need to use their mobile phone to fill out a health declaration form prior to their departure, and make an affidavit stating that the location of their 14-day home quarantine (in a quarantine hotel or in a home with one person per residence) meets relevant regulations.
- Thailand: On 1 November 2021 Thailand reopened to vaccinated tourists from 63 countries with no quarantine condition.
- Uzbekistan: Uzbekistan has resumed international flights for certain categories of travelers from countries deemed to have a stable epidemiological situation. The complete list of countries includes the EU, Japan, South Korea, China, Israel, Malaysia, Thailand, Singapore, the United Arab Emirates, Turkey, Iran, Afghanistan, Russia and CIS countries (Armenia, Azerbaijan, Belarus, Kazakhstan, Kyrgyzstan, Moldova, Russia, and Tajikistan).

=== Europe ===
Earlier before the announcement of the pandemic by the World Health Organization, the European Union rejected the idea of suspending the Schengen free travel zone and introducing border controls with Italy, a decision which has been criticised by some European politicians. After some EU member states announced complete closure of their national borders to foreign nationals in March 2020, the European Commission President Ursula von der Leyen said that "Certain controls may be justified, but general travel bans are not seen as being the most effective by the World Health Organization." A few days later the EU closed its external borders.

The European Council agreed on 17 March 2020 to ban incoming travel other than citizens from countries in the European Union, European Economic Area, Switzerland and United Kingdom, long-term residents and people with long-term visa or residence permits, family members of EU and EEA citizens, medical personnel and people responsible for transport of goods for 30 days. Each country had to implement the decision on the national level. Ireland choose to opt out from the decision due to the Common Travel Area. The agreement was to close borders for 30 days starting at noon on 17 March, though enforcement did not begin immediately as planned. By the end of March, all EU member states (except Ireland) and all associated Schengen states (Iceland, Liechtenstein, Norway and Switzerland) had introduced the travel restriction. The restriction was later repeatedly prolonged until 30 June. These restrictions did not only refer to travel between countries from March to June. In Spain, for example, mobility had been restricted and public transport had been greatly affected by the lockdowns imposed by the government and only essential travels had been allowed under severe restrictions. Some member states went further and also prohibited EU and EEA citizens from entering, unless they are permanently living in the country or transiting to their home country, which was generally still possible. On 1 July 2020, the global travel ban was replaced by non-global travel ban. The EU Council recommended a gradual lifting of the temporary restrictions on travel into the EU (including Iceland, Lichtenstein, Norway and Switzerland) from 1 July 2020. The European Council had adopted a Recommendation on the gradual lifting of the temporary restrictions on non-essential travel into the EU on 30 June. Travel restrictions were lifted for countries listed in the recommendation. The list was updated, in principle, every two weeks. Several countries (Algeria, Canada, Georgia, Jordan, Morocco, Montenegro, Serbia, Tunisia and Uruguay) have been removed from the EU designated COVID-19 safe countries list since it was introduced on 30 June 2020, and no new country was ever added to that list. As of 16 December 2020, the Safe Countries list included Australia, Japan, New Zealand, Rwanda, Singapore, South Korea and Thailand. Traveling citizens from China will be allowed entry based on the re-opening of its borders to European travelers. British nationals were no longer considered EU citizens starting 1 January 2021 and were subject to each member state's travel restriction on non-EU nationals. For the purpose of the recommendation residents of Andorra, Monaco, San Marino and the Vatican were also considered EU residents. The recommendation was not a legally binding instrument and the member states were responsible for implementing it.

On 28 January 2021, the European Union reinstated a travel ban from Japan due to an alarming rise in COVID-19 cases, removing Japan from the EU's safe countries list. The following countries were listed as safe countries amidst the pandemic – Australia, Rwanda, Singapore, South Korea, New Zealand and Thailand. The European Council suggested member states to gradually remove restrictions for China, subject to confirmation of reciprocity.

- Countries in the European Union/Schengen Area:
  - Austria: Entry from EU/EEA countries (including UK, Vatican City, Andorra, Monaco, Iceland, Lichtenstein, Norway, Switzerland and San Marino) was allowed without PCR test or mandatory quarantine, only if the traveler could prove that they were in only one of those countries in the past 10 days. Entry from Australia, Japan, New Zealand, South Korea and Uruguay was also allowed on condition that the traveler could prove they had been in only one of those countries in the past 10 days, with no restrictions. There were restrictions for arrivals coming from parts of Croatia, France, Portugal, Spain, Bulgaria and Romania.
  - Belgium: Entry from all EU and Schengen countries and the Safe Countries designated by European Council is allowed with no restrictions. If travelers visit certain parts of several countries in Europe, they must quarantine or take a COVID-19 test upon returning to Belgium. These include areas of Bulgaria, Cyprus, certain regions in Germany, several French departments, Greece, several areas in Croatia, Liechtenstein, Luxembourg, Monaco, some provinces in the Netherlands, large swathes of Spain and the United Kingdom, among others.
  - Bulgaria: Bulgaria opened its borders on 1 June 2020 to EU countries, the UK, San Marino, Andorra, Monaco, Vatican, Serbia and North Macedonia citizens. Travellers from Algeria, Australia, Canada, Georgia, Japan, Morocco, New Zealand, Rwanda, South Korea, Thailand, Tunisia, Uruguay, Ukraine are allowed in too with no need to present a negative COVID-19 test.
  - Croatia: Entry from EU countries (including UK, Vatican City, Andorra, Monaco, Iceland, Lichtenstein, Norway, Switzerland and San Marino) is allowed with no restrictions.
  - Cyprus: As of 6 June 2020, Cyprus is open for tourism. Authorities have created three categories based on countries' epidemiological situation, which detail if passengers from these destinations are allowed to enter and under what conditions.
  - Czech Republic: Travel into the Czech Republic for any purpose, including tourism is allowed.
  - Denmark: Non-essential travel from most EU countries was banned. Additionally, non-citizens with clear symptoms cannot enter Denmark.
  - Estonia: Entry from EU countries (including UK, Vatican City, Andorra, Monaco, Iceland, Lichtenstein, Norway, Switzerland and San Marino) is allowed with no restrictions.
  - Faroe Islands: Faroe Islands allows travelers to enter from countries defined as "open" by Denmark. The Danish Government has announced that countries other than EU Member States, Schengen countries and the United Kingdom are currently by definition banned countries. All people travelling to the Faroe Islands must be tested for COVID-19. This requirement also applies to Faroese citizens and residents who have been travelling abroad.
  - Finland: As of 12 October 2020, non-essential travel from all EU/Schengen countries is banned.
  - France: Travellers from EU member states as well as Andorra, Australia, Canada, Georgia, the Holy See, Iceland, Japan, Liechtenstein, Monaco, New Zealand, Norway, Rwanda, San Marino, South Korea, Switzerland, Thailand, Tunisia, the United Kingdom and Uruguay have been allowed to visit the county since 15 June without a health certificate or any form of quarantine upon arrival.
  - Germany: Entry from most of EU countries (including UK, Vatican City, Andorra, Monaco, Iceland, Lichtenstein, Norway, Switzerland and San Marino) is allowed with no restrictions. Travellers from some EU countries are required to have negative COVID-19 test.
  - Greece: Entry from EU countries (including UK, Vatican City, Andorra, Monaco, Iceland, Lichtenstein, Norway, Switzerland and San Marino) is allowed with no restrictions.
  - Greenland: Greenland allows travelers to enter from countries defined as "open" by Denmark. They must have a COVID-19 test taken in a Nordic country in the 5 days before travel. All travellers upon arrival in Greenland must go into 14 days quarantine.
  - Iceland Iceland allowed tourists to arrive from 15 June 2020, however, COVID-19 tests is mandatory. Iceland has restricted the entry of all travelers who are not nationals of EEA Member States, Andorra, Monaco, San Marino, Switzerland, Vatican City, or the United Kingdom. Iceland allows foreign citizens that are verifiably residents in and traveling from Australia, Japan, New Zealand, Rwanda, Singapore, South Korea or Thailand.
  - Italy: Borders in Italy opened 3 June 2020 to citizens from the EU, UK, Schengen area, Andorra, Vatican City, San Marino and Monaco, following a nationwide lockdown which came into force on 9 March. On 3 December 2020, a new Decree by the Prime Minister (DPCM) was approved, which contained provisions for the national territory and for travel to/from abroad. These provisions were in force from 4 December 2020, to 15 January 2021. Travelers from Australia, Japan, New Zealand, Rwanda, Republic of Korea, Singapore and Thailand are allowed to enter.
  - Latvia: Entry from most of EU countries (including UK, Vatican City, Andorra, Monaco, Iceland, Lichtenstein, Norway, Switzerland and San Marino) is allowed with no restrictions. Travellers from some EU countries are required to have negative COVID-19 test. Since 10 October 2020, Latvia has introduced a ten-day quarantine from travellers from high-risk countries.
  - Lithuania: Entry from EU countries (including UK, Vatican City, Andorra, Monaco, Iceland, Lichtenstein, Norway, Switzerland and San Marino) is allowed with no restrictions.
  - Malta: Entry from EU countries (including UK, Vatican City, Andorra, Monaco, Iceland, Lichtenstein, Norway, Switzerland and San Marino) is allowed with no restrictions.
  - Norway: Travellers from EEA/Schengen countries with "acceptable levels of infection" have been able to visit the country since 15 July 2020. Norway currently has a 10-day quarantine (at a designated quarantine hotel for non-residents) for those returning from international travel.
  - Poland: Borders reopened for EU nationals on 13 June 2020 with no quarantine condition, and some international flights from within the bloc have restarted.
  - Portugal: Nationals of EU countries, Schengen area and passengers on flights from the UK, Brazil, the Community of Portuguese Language Countries, the US, Canada, Venezuela and South Africa are allowed in the country.
  - Romania: People coming from EU countries as well as Norway, Switzerland, Iceland and Liechtenstein may enter but they must self-isolate for 14 days if the incidence rate in their country of origin is greater than the one in Romania.
  - Slovakia: Entry from most of EU countries (including UK, Vatican City, Andorra, Monaco, Iceland, Lichtenstein, Norway, Switzerland and San Marino) is allowed with no restrictions. Everyone entering the country from abroad must provide a negative PCR test taken within the previous 72 hours, or self-isolate for 10 days or until they present a negative test.
  - Slovenia: Entry from most of EU countries (including UK, Vatican City, Andorra, Monaco, Iceland, Lichtenstein, Norway, Switzerland and San Marino) is allowed with no restrictions. Travellers from some EU countries are required to have negative COVID-19 test. Anyone entering from a country with high levels of COVID-19 will have to quarantine for 14 days.
  - Spain: Spain reopened its borders to EU member states, Schengen area countries and the UK on 21 June. None of these travellers have to self-isolate.
  - Sweden: Beginning 19 March 2020, there was an entry ban which applied to all foreign citizens attempting to enter Sweden from all countries except those in the EEA, the UK and Switzerland.
  - Switzerland: Switzerland reopened borders to all EU countries, the UK, Norway, Iceland and Liechtenstein on 15 June 2020.
- Other European countries:
  - Isle of Man: As of 28 June 2021, Isle of Man reopens borders to non-residents. Any visitors will have to apply for a permit in advance of their trip.
  - Moldova: As of 1 September 2020, Moldova opened its borders for citizens of 53 countries.
  - Russia: As of 4 September 2021, Russia has reopened its borders to nationals and residents of 49 countries, allowing tourists to visit. All passengers from approved countries must have a negative PCR test, taken no longer than 72 hours before arrival.
  - United Kingdom: All incoming passengers must complete a passenger locator form in advance, including their departure country and UK address. They also have to show proof of a negative COVID-19 test taken within 72 hours before travelling to be allowed entry. Travellers must then self-isolate for 10 days. A rule taking effect 2 August 2021 will remove the isolation requirement for fully vaccinated people coming from Europe and the US. As of January 2021, there were travel bans on 33 countries "where the risk of a new variant is greatest". Under its 33 'red list countries', the UK banned all direct flights from the UAE due to rising concerns over the spread of a South African COVID-19 variant. Those arriving from the UAE in the previous 10 days were not be allowed to enter the UK. UK nationals and people with residency rights coming via UAE could enter the UK but must self-isolate in government-approved hotels for 10 days. Failure to do so would imply a fine up to £10,000 or a prison sentence up to 10 years.

=== Oceania ===
- Australia: Entry denied to all travellers except residents of New Zealand and Singapore. Since 16 October 2020, all arrivals from New Zealand regardless of citizenship cщгдв enter Australia, without having to undergo mandatory quarantine (provided they have been in New Zealand for at least 14 days). This arrangement was partially suspended from 25 to 31 January, 15–21 and 25 February – 20 March 2021, due to community transmission in New Zealand. However, any person – regardless of citizenship or residency status – travelling to Australia from any other international destination will be required to undergo a compulsory 14-day quarantine, beginning from their date of arrival. The regulations, effective from 16 March 2020, also ban cruise ships arriving from international waters from docking at any Australian port. According to Josh Frydenberg, the Treasurer of Australia, Australia's international borders would largely remain closed until mid-2022 at the earliest. Only fully vaccinated citizens, permanent residents, and their immediate family, as well as fully vaccinated travellers from New Zealand and Singapore, were allowed in.
- New Zealand: Entry was denied to all travellers except residents of Australia. Quarantine-free flights from New Zealand to Australia began in October 2020 and from Australia to New Zealand in April 2021. The Australia/New Zealand travel bubble was suspended on 24 July 2021 due to Delta outbreaks in Australia. Since 21 January 2021, all arrivals from the Cook Islands can enter New Zealand, without having to undergo mandatory quarantine (provided they have been in Cook Islands for at least 14 days). However, on 19 March 2020 borders were closed to all other non-citizens and non-residents including the previously exempt Pacific Islands or temporary visa holders. On 15 March 2020, any person entering New Zealand from overseas, including New Zealand citizens, was required to undergo mandatory Managed Isolation and Quarantine (MIQ), for 14 days following entry. All cruise ships were banned.

== Countries and territories open for tourism ==
A majority of countries are open for tourism. Some entry restrictions may be in place, such as requiring a PCR test or proof of vaccination.

=== Africa ===
- Benin: Benin has resumed most transportation options (including airport operations) and business operations (including day cares and schools), although land borders remain closed to most travelers.
- Botswana: As of 1 December 2020, citizens from all countries are welcome in Botswana under regular visa laws, all passengers must have a negative COVID-19 test within 72 hours before arrival.
- Cape Verde: As of 12 October 2020, Cape Verde is officially open for tourism. All travelers must provide the results of a negative COVID-19 test taken within 72 hours of arrival.
- Democratic Republic of the Congo: As of 15 August 2020, The Democratic Republic of the Congo has resumed commercial flights. All travelers need to present a negative COVID-19 test.
- Djibouti: As of 18 July 2020, Djiboutian air, sea and land borders have reopened.
- Egypt: As of 1 July 2020, Egypt is officially open for tourism. As of 15 August, all passengers must have a negative COVID-19 test within 72 hours before arrival.
- Ethiopia: Ethiopia has reopened its airports for international arrivals. Passengers will need to bring a negative PCR test taken within 5 days of arrival. They are also required to self-isolate at home for 14 days.
- Ghana: As of 1 September 2020, Ghana is officially open for tourism, all new arrivals must take a coronavirus test 72 hours prior to arrival.
- Kenya: As of 1 August 2020, Kenya has opened its international airports to regular air traffic. All arriving passengers on international flights whose body temperature is NOT above 37.5 °C (99.5 °F); do NOT have a persistent cough, difficulty in breathing or other flu-like symptoms; have negative PCR based COVID–19 test carried out within 96 hours before travel and are from countries considered low to medium risk COVID–19 transmission areas would be exempt from quarantine.
- Liberia: As of 29 June 2020, Liberia has opened its international airport to regular air traffic.
- Mauritius: On 15 July 2021, Mauritius reopened its borders for vaccinated travellers after 16 months of closure. Travelers must present proof of a negative PCR COVID-19 test taken no longer than 72 hours before departure.
- Namibia: As of 1 September 2020, Namibia has reopened its international airport to regular air traffic.
- Nigeria: As of 5 September 2020, Nigeria has reopened its international airports to regular air traffic. All countries can once again enter Nigeria under normal visa rules.
- Republic of the Congo: As of 24 August, The Republic of Congo reopened its international airports and international passenger flights have resumed. Travelers entering the Republic of Congo must present a negative COVID-19 test from within 72 hours of departure upon arrival.
- Rwanda: As of 1 August 2020, Rwanda has opened its international airport to regular air traffic.
- Seychelles: On 25 March 2021, the Seychelles have reopened to tourists from all countries. All travelers need to present a negative COVID-19 test.
- Sierra Leone: Sierra Leone reopened for tourism on 22 July 2020.
- South Africa: As of 1 October 2020, South Africa is officially open for tourism, all new arrivals not in possession of a negative PCR test taken within 72 hours will be required to test on arrival.
- Tanzania: Tanzania has not implemented any entry restrictions.
- Togo: As of 1 August 2020, Togo reopened its international airport and international passenger flights have resumed. Travelers entering Togo must present a negative COVID-19 test.
- Tunisia: As of 16 November 2020, all countries are welcome in Tunisia under regular visa laws, all passengers must have a negative COVID-19 test within 72 hours before arrival.
- Uganda: Uganda reopened for tourism on 1 October 2020.
- Zambia: As of 26 June 2020, Zambia has opened its international airports to regular air traffic. Non-residents entering Zambia must show a negative COVID-19 test result from within the past 14 days.
- Zimbabwe: As of 1 October 2020, Zimbabwe is officially open for tourism. All arrivals, regardless if they are nationals returning home or foreign tourists, will need to bring a negative PCR test with them, taken no longer than 48 hours before the time of flight departure.

=== Americas ===
- Antigua and Barbuda: Antigua and Barbuda officially reopened to international visitors on 4 June 2020. A negative COVID-19 test is not required in order to enter Antigua and Barbuda, testing will be done upon arrival to all incoming passengers. There is no quarantine required upon arrival.
- Argentina: As of 1 November 2021, Argentina is officially open for tourism.
- Bahamas: As of 1 July 2020, the Bahamas are officially open for tourism. All travelers must present proof of a negative COVID-19 PCR test. The test result can not be older than 7 days prior to the date of arrival.
- Barbados: Barbados does not have any entry restrictions. On arrival in Barbados, travelers are required to present evidence of a negative result of a PCR COVID-19 test. If an arriving passenger, does not have a negative test within 72 hours, they will need to get a test at the airport, and then quarantine for up to two days at their own expense until test results come in. If a passenger tests positive they will be put into isolation.
- Belize: As of 1 October 2020, Belize is officially open for tourism. All passengers, of all nationalities, who meet immigration rules are permitted entry to Belize.
- Bermuda: As of 1 July 2020, Bermuda has opened its international airport to regular air traffic. All tourists are charged a fee of $75 USD to cover COVID-19 tests on arrival.
- Bolivia: As of 12 October 2020, Bolivia has reopened its borders to all countries for tourism. Travelers are required to present a negative PCR test result.
- Brazil: As of 29 July 2020, Brazil is officially open for tourism.
- British Virgin Islands: British Virgin Islands officially reopened to international tourism in December 2020. All arriving visitors are required to quarantine for four days at their hotel, resort, villa or docked vessel.
- Canada: Effective 1 October 2022, Canada reverted to pre-COVID restrictions on entry, no longer requiring vaccination or a pre-departure test or form.
- Chile: As of 23 November 2020, Chile is officially open for tourism. Incoming passengers are required to show a negative PCR coronavirus test no more than three days old.
- Colombia: As of 19 September 2020, Colombia has opened its international airports to regular air traffic. Travelers are required to present a negative PCR test result issued within 96 hours prior to departure.
- Costa Rica: As of 1 November 2020, visitors from all nations are welcome under 'normal/pre-covid' visa requirements and PCR testing is no longer required for tourists entering the country.
- Cuba: As of 15 November 2020, travelers from all countries are permitted to visit Cuba under regular visa requirements. Tourists arriving into Cuba are tested for COVID-19 at the airport and must wait up to 24 hours in a hotel for a negative result.
- Dominica: As of 7 August 2020, Dominica is officially open for tourism, but all new arrivals must take a coronavirus test 24–72 hours prior to arrival hours before they travel.
- Dominican Republic: As of 8 July 2020, Dominican Republic is officially open for tourism.
- Ecuador: As of 1 June 2020, Ecuador has opened its international airport to regular air traffic.
- El Salvador: As of 19 September 2020, El Salvador's airports resumed commercial flights. Incoming passengers are required to show a negative PCR coronavirus test no more than three days old.
- Grenada: As of 1 August 2020, Grenada is officially open for tourism.
- Guatemala: As of 18 September 2020, Guatemala reopened its domestic and international airports to regular air traffic, as well as official border crossings. Arriving passengers must provide the results of a negative COVID-19 test no more than three days old, except Guatemalan citizens, foreign residents and diplomats at land border crossings.
- Guyana: As of 12 October 2020, Guyana is officially open for tourism.
- Haiti: On 1 July 2020, Haiti reopened its two international airports in Port-au-Prince and Cape Haitian, as well as four official border crossings.
- Honduras: On 17 August 2020, Honduras reopened its domestic and international airports to regular air traffic. Arriving passengers must provide the results of a negative COVID-19 test.
- Jamaica: As of 15 June 2020, Jamaica is officially open for tourism.
- Martinique: Martinique does not have any entry restrictions, but all arriving passengers, must quarantine for 14 days.
- Mexico: Mexico does not have any entry restrictions.
- Nicaragua: Nicaragua has not implemented any entry restrictions.
- Panama: As of 12 October 2020, Panama is officially open for tourism. Arriving passengers must provide the results of a negative COVID-19 test taken within 48 hours of arrival.
- Paraguay: In December 2020, Paraguay re-opened its borders to tourists. Arriving passengers must provide the results of a negative COVID-19 test taken within 72 hours of arrival.
- Puerto Rico: Puerto Rico has not implemented any entry restrictions, but all new arrivals must take a coronavirus test 72 hours before they travel.
- Saint Lucia: As of 4 June 2020, Saint Lucia is officially open for tourism. Arriving passengers must provide the results of a negative COVID-19 test taken within 48 hours of arrival.
- Saint Vincent and the Grenadines: As of 1 July 2020, Saint Vincent and the Grenadines is officially open for tourism. Arriving passengers will be tested upon arrival and must wait 24 hours in hotel for the results.
- Sint Maarten: As of 1 August 2020, Sint Maarten is officially open for tourism.
- Turks and Caicos Islands: As of 22 July 2020, Turks And Caicos is officially open for tourism.
- United States: From the beginning of the pandemic and into 2021, the northern and southern borders were closed to non-essential travel by people who were neither U.S. citizens nor permanent residents. Following the declaration of a public health emergency on 31 January 2020, people other than U.S. citizens, permanent residents, and their immediate family were prohibited from entering the U.S. within 14 days of being in China. On 2 February, all inbound passengers who had been to Hubei in the previous 14 days were placed under quarantine for up to 14 days. American citizens who had traveled to the rest of mainland China were allowed to continue their transit home if they were asymptomatic, but would be monitored by local health departments. From 2 March, foreign nationals who had traveled to Iran within the past 14 days were denied permission to enter the U.S. American citizens and permanent residents returning to the United States who had travelled to Iran within the previous 14 days had to enter through an approved airport. On 13 March, incoming travel from the Schengen area in Europe was suspended. A proclamation issued days earlier stated that this restriction applied only to foreign nationals who had been to a country within the Schengen area in the past 14 days. The ban did not apply to, for example, legal permanent residents and most immediate family members of U.S. citizens. Also, cargo and trading goods were not affected. On 14 March, the Trump administration extended the ban to include the United Kingdom and Ireland for 30 days, although the proclamation more vaguely said they would "remain in effect until terminated by the President". Effective 29 May, foreigners coming from Brazil were restricted from entering the US. On 6 August, the U.S. Department of State lifted a Level 4 global health travel advisory issued on 19 March which advised American citizens to avoid all international travel. As of 26 January 2021, all air passengers ages two and older must show proof of a negative COVID-19 test to enter the United States and travel restrictions were reinstated for people who visited the Schengen Area, the Federative Republic of Brazil, the United Kingdom, the Republic of Ireland and South Africa, 14 days before their attempted entry into the US. A rule change scheduled to take effect in November 2021 would require a narrower testing window for unvaccinated travelers: a test within one day of entry to the US for those who are unvaccinated, compared to three days allowed for fully vaccinated travelers. Unvaccinated travelers will also have to test a second time after they land in the US. On 8 November 2021, after nearly 20 months of travel ban, vaccinated international tourists were allowed to travel to the USA.
- United States Virgin Islands: As of 1 June 2020, United States Virgin Islands are officially open for tourism. Tourists must undergo temperature checks and health screenings upon entry.
- Uruguay: On 1 November 2021, Uruguay reopened its borders to vaccinated foreigners.

=== Asia ===
- Afghanistan: As of 24 June 2020, Afghanistan has resumed international air travel.
- Armenia: As of 12 August 2020, Armenia has reopened its borders to air passenger tourists from all nations.
- Bahrain: Effective from 4 September 2020, Bahrain has reopened its borders to tourists and non-residents from 182 countries. Passengers must undergo a PCR test at their own expense after landing. Those staying in the country for longer than 10 days must take a follow-up test on the 10th day of their visit.
- Georgia: As of 1 February 2021, Georgia is officially open for tourism. Travelers have 2 choices: They can enter restrictions-free if they are vaccinated, or if not, they can undergo a double testing procedure. Georgia has lifted all restrictions for foreign travellers, who are arriving by air and are able to show proof of being twice vaccinated for COVID-19.
- Iraq: As of 23 July 2020, Iraq has resumed international air travel. All travelers arriving from abroad will be requested to quarantine for 14 days and may be requested to provide proof of reservation in a hotel for the duration of the quarantine period.
- Jordan: As of December 2020, all nations can enter Jordan as long as they fulfill all covid-related entry requirements and visa requirements. All passengers entering Jordan for tourism will need to perform multiple PCR tests: pre-flight PCR test with results issued no more than 72 hours before arrival, PCR Test on arrival, and a PCR test on the 7th day of quarantine.
- Kyrgyzstan: As of 4 December 2020, visitors from all countries may visit Kyrgyzstan under normal visa regulations. Travelers must present proof of a negative PCR COVID-19 test taken no longer than 72 hours before departure.
- Lebanon: As of 1 October 2020, Lebanon has resumed international air travel. Travelers arriving from countries that do not provide PCR tests ahead of boarding will be tested upon arrival in Lebanon at the airline's expense.
- Maldives: As of 15 July 2020, the Maldives is allowing visitors to travel to the country under normal 'pre-Covid' regulations. That includes no isolation period for arriving tourists. Effective 10 September 2020, arriving passengers must provide the results of a negative COVID-19 test taken within 72 hours of arrival.
- Nepal: As of December 2020, Nepal is officially open for tourism. Travelers must present proof of a negative PCR COVID-19 test taken no longer than 72 hours before departure. All travelers must quarantine for 14 days upon arrival at a hotel.
- Oman: As of 29 December 2020, Oman is officially open for tourism. Arriving passengers must provide the results of a negative COVID-19 test taken within 72 hours of arrival.
- Pakistan: As of 5 October 2020, Pakistan is officially open for tourism. Travelers are required to present a negative PCR test result issued within 96 hours prior to departure.
- Qatar: As of 12 July 2021, Qatar has reopened to fully vaccinated travellers. Visitors from all countries may enter Qatar under normal visa regulations.
- Saudi Arabia: As of 17 May 2021, visitors from all countries may visit Saudi Arabia under normal visa regulations.
- South Korea: Effective 1 October 2022, all travellers regardless of vaccination or infection status can immediately enter the country upon arrival without any Covid tests or quarantine requirement. South Korea has reopened visa-free tourist entries through electronic travel authorization, including many countries in the Americas, Asia-Pacific and Europe.
- Sri Lanka: As of 21 January 2021, Sri Lanka is officially open for tourism. Everyone coming into the country must show proof of a negative coronavirus test taken within 96 hours of travel and fill out an online health declaration form. Guests will be tested again at their own expense on the fifth and seventh days after arriving and people staying longer than seven days will have to take a third test the following week.
- United Arab Emirates (Abu Dhabi): As of 24 December 2020, Emirate of Abu Dhabi in the United Arab Emirates is officially open for tourism. Arriving passengers must provide the results of a negative COVID-19 test taken within 96 hours of arrival. Any visitors travelling from countries, regions and territories on the 'green' list is exempt from quarantine requirements. For flights from all other destinations, travelers are required to quarantine for up to 10 days.
- United Arab Emirates (Dubai): As of 7 July 2020, Emirate of Dubai in the United Arab Emirates is officially open for tourism. Arriving passengers must provide the results of a negative COVID-19 test taken within 96 hours of arrival or undergo a mandatory PCR test at the Dubai airports.

=== Europe ===
- Albania: Albania officially reopened its borders for tourism on 1 July 2020 allowing tourists from all countries and nations to enter without restrictions. All normal 'pre-covid' entry requirements apply.
- Belarus: Belarus has not implemented any entry restrictions.
- Bosnia and Herzegovina: As of 16 July 2020, Bosnia and Herzegovina has reopened its borders for citizens of European Union with a negative test for coronavirus not older than 48 hours. As of 12 September 2020, the country has reopen borders for all foreign tourists who have a negative PCR test for coronavirus.
- Guernsey: Guernsey has not implemented any entry restrictions, but imposed a requirement on all persons arriving in the Bailiwick from anywhere in the world (including Jersey and the UK) to self-isolate for 14 days on arrival. This is a legal requirement, and failure to comply is a criminal offence.
- Jersey: Jersey has not implemented any entry restrictions. From Friday 20 March, all travellers arriving in Jersey must now self-isolate for 14 days. This includes the UK, Guernsey, Europe and the rest of the world.
- Kosovo: As of 28 June 2020, Kosovo is officially open for tourism with no restrictions.
- North Macedonia: North Macedonia reopened its land borders on 26 June and its airports on 1 July for commercial traffic. Those entering the country will not be obliged to observe home quarantine for two weeks.
- Serbia: As of 22 May 2020, Serbia is allowing visitors to travel to the country under normal 'pre-Covid' regulations. That includes no mandatory testing and no isolation period for arriving tourists.
- Turkey: All passengers, of all nationalities, who meet Turkish immigration rules are permitted entry into Turkey from 12 June.
- Ukraine: As of 28 September 2020, Ukraine is officially open for tourism.
- European Union/Schengen Area:
  - Republic of Ireland: Ireland is not currently implementing any entry restrictions, but any person entering Ireland from abroad, including Irish citizens and residents of Ireland, must self-isolate for 14 days upon arrival. This includes Great Britain but not Northern Ireland. A green list of 15 countries was published by the Government of Ireland on 21 July 2020 from which people could travel without having to quarantine for 14 days upon arriving in Ireland. People who arrived in Ireland from countries not on the green list would still have to restrict their movements. As of July 2021, Ireland started to implement the EU Digital COVID Certificate, like the rest of Europe, allowing those with proof of being fully vaccinated to not be required to go into quarantine.

== See also ==
- Impact of the COVID-19 pandemic on aviation
- Impact of the COVID-19 pandemic on cinema
- COVID-19 pandemic on cruise ships
- Impact of the COVID-19 pandemic on education
- Impact of the COVID-19 pandemic on religion
- Impact of the COVID-19 pandemic on politics
- Impact of the COVID-19 pandemic on sports
- Impact of the COVID-19 pandemic on television
