= Health Protection (Coronavirus, International Travel and Operator Liability) (England) Regulations 2021 =

United Kingdom emergency legislation

- Statutory Instrument
- Parliament of the United Kingdom
- Citation: SI 2021/582
- Introduced by: Matt Hancock, Secretary of State for Health and Social Care
- Territorial extent: England

Dates
- Made: 14 May 2021
- Laid before Parliament: 14 May 2021
- Commencement: 17 May 2021
- Revoked: 18 March 2022

Other legislation
- Repeals/revokes: Health Protection (Coronavirus, International Travel) (England) Regulations 2020
- Made under: Public Health (Control of Disease) Act 1984
- Revoked by: Health Protection (Coronavirus, International Travel and Operator Liability) (Revocation) (England) Regulations 2022

Status: Revoked

Text of the Health Protection (Coronavirus, International Travel and Operator Liability) (England) Regulations 2021 as in force today (including any amendments) within the United Kingdom, from legislation.gov.uk.

The Health Protection (Coronavirus, International Travel and Operator Liability) (England) Regulations 2021 (SI 2021/582) is a statutory instrument (SI) made on 14 May 2021 by the Secretary of State for Health and Social Care, Matt Hancock, in response to the COVID-19 pandemic. The regulations aimed to reduce the possibility of infection spreading from travellers from overseas. They revoked and replaced the Health Protection (Coronavirus, International Travel) (England) Regulations 2020 (SI 2020/568), and introduced a new set of requirements for international travellers who arrived in England having begun their journey outside the Common Travel Area (CTA) (Scotland, Wales, Northern Ireland, the Republic of Ireland, the Channel Islands and Isle of Man), as well as travellers arriving from within the CTA who had been outside the CTA in the 10 days preceding their arrival. Travellers arriving in England who had remained entirely within the CTA during the preceding 10 days were mostly not affected.

The regulations were amended many times over the subsequent months, before being revoked on 18 March 2022.

== Summary ==
As initially enacted on 17 May 2021, the regulations introduced a new traffic light system of country categorisation (similar but not identical to the revoked Exempt / Not exempt / Red list categories of SI 2020/568), with most international travellers arriving in England being placed into one of three categories depending on the highest risk-level country (Green / Amber / Red) that they had been in over the preceding 10 days. Restrictions including mandatory COVID-19 testing, home self-isolation, and hotel isolation were applied depending on the traveller's category. The regulations were modified many times in response to changing levels of perceived threat, with direct air or boat journeys being forbidden at various times from certain high risk countries.

On 4 October 2021, the regulations were significantly amended to abolish the traffic light system, with only the Red list category being retained. Travellers (unless exempt) from Red list countries remained subject to stringent measures, including mandatory hotel quarantine, while 'eligible travellers' from other countries were subject to lesser levels of restriction based on vaccine status and country of vaccination. Over the subsequent weeks, the number of countries on the Red list was gradually though not consistently reduced, and by 15 December no Red list countries remained. From 15 December, non-exempt travellers from all countries were in practice treated in the same way. From 7 December, all non-exempt travellers over the age of 12, regardless of vaccination status, had to take an approved test no more than two days before their final departure for England.

From 7 January 2022, fully vaccinated travellers no longer needed to possess notification of a negative test result on arrival in England. On day 2 after arrival a test was required, but there was no longer any requirement to self-isolate while awaiting the result.

On 11 February 2022, all testing and self-isolation requirements for fully vaccinated travellers were abolished. Non-eligible travellers still had to pre-book a day 2 test, but did not need to self-isolate on arrival.

The regulations were finally revoked on 18 March 2022.

== Legal basis and commencement ==
The Health Protection (Coronavirus, International Travel) (England) Regulations 2020 (SI 2020/568) were introduced by way of a statutory instrument made by the Secretary of State for Health and Social Care, Matt Hancock, using emergency powers available to him under sections 45B, 45F(2) and 45P(2) of the Public Health (Control of Disease) Act 1984. They came into effect on 17 May 2021.

== 'Traffic light' rules, from 17 May 2021; some rules retained after 4 October 2021 ==
=== Green list arrivals, 17 May to 4 October 2021 ===
- The rules in this section were abolished on 4 October 2021.

Places listed in schedule 1 to the Regulations, legally "Category 1 countries and territories", were commonly referred to as the "Green list". The following rules applied to all arrivals (unless exempt) who had been in a Green list country during the preceding 10 days, and who had NOT been in any Amber or Red list country.

==== Requirement to provide information ====
Travellers had to provide information on a passenger locator form in prescribed format which had to be completed on arrival into England or, for passengers on the Eurotunnel Shuttle, at immigration control in Calais. Passengers could complete the form up to 48 hours in advance.

The required information included the passenger's personal data, journey details, and details of the place they intended to stay during the next 10 days or to self-isolate if required. COVID-19 testing details could also be required.

There were exemptions for certain government contractors, foreign government officials, transport workers, seamen, aircrew, channel tunnel workers, transit passengers, road hauliers, essential and emergency workers, offshore oil workers, some specialist, clinical and medical workers, seasonal workers, people who have to travel for work at least weekly, and elite sportspeople. Also exempt were members of diplomatic or consular missions, representatives of international organisations afforded privileges and immunities in the UK, diplomatic and consular couriers, government representatives on official business, and some members of their households.

==== Requirement to possess negative test result ====
On arrival in England (or at immigration control in Calais), travellers had on request to present notification of a negative COVID-19 test result. The test had to be of an approved type, and administered no more than three days earlier.

There were exemptions for children under the age of 11, certain government contractors, foreign government officials, seamen, aircrew, channel tunnel workers, and road hauliers.

==== Requirement to pre-book a day 2 test ====
Travellers had at their own expense to pre-book an additional COVID-19 test, to be taken on day 2 after arrival. If the result of the test was negative, there were no further restrictions and no requirement to self-isolate. If positive, the person had to self-isolate as described below in connection with Amber country arrivals.

Children under the age of five were exempt from the testing requirement, and there was an extensive list of other exemptions and special cases.

=== Amber list arrivals, from 17 May 2021 ===
- The self-isolation rules and exemptions of this section were largely retained by the 4 October 2021 amendments, re-purposed as rules for non Red list non eligible travellers.

The "Category 2 countries and territories" of the regulations as initially enacted were countries not in the Common Travel Area that were not listed in schedules 1 or 3. These were commonly referred to as the "Amber list". Any country not mentioned by name was automatically deemed to be on the Amber list. The following rules applied to all arrivals (unless exempt) who had been in an Amber list country during the preceding 10 days, and who had NOT been in any Red list country.

==== Requirement to provide information ====
Same as arrivals from Green list countries.

==== Requirement to possess negative test result ====
Same as arrivals from Green list countries.

From 7 December 2021 a pre-travel test had to be taken by all travellers, regardless of vaccination status, no more than two days prior to the final leg of the journey to England.

==== Requirement to pre-book day 2 and day 8 tests ====
Travellers had at their own expense to pre-book a 'testing package' comprising additional day 2 and day 8 COVID-19 tests. Children under the age of five were exempt, and there was an extensive list of other exemptions and special cases.

==== Self-isolation ====
Travellers had to self-isolate at home or some other approved location normally for at least 10 days, or longer if either of the tests returned a positive result. In some circumstances optional private tests were permitted which, if negative, allowed early release. The traveller did not need to remain in isolation during that period from any person they live with at home, nor from anyone with whom they were travelling.

People who were self-isolating were not allowed to leave their place of self-isolation except:

- to travel to leave England, provided they did so directly
- to seek medical or veterinary assistance, or to obtain a COVID-19 test where required
- to fulfil a legal obligation such as to attend court, satisfy bail conditions, or participate in legal proceedings
- to avoid injury or illness or to escape a risk of harm
- on compassionate grounds, such as attending certain funerals
- to move to a different place of self-isolation
- in exceptional circumstances, for example to obtain basic necessities such as food or medical supplies where these could not be obtained in any other manner
- to access critical public services.

Some road hauliers could self-isolate in the sleeping cab of a goods vehicle, in which case they could also go outside for sanitary reasons, to take exercise, and to inspect, load or refuel the vehicle.

==== Amber list exemptions from 19 July 2021 ====
From 19 July 2021 some arrivals from Amber list countries were exempted from the need to self-isolate. To be exempt, the traveller must not during the preceding 10 days have visited any Red list country, and must have completed a course of vaccination in the UK or as part of the UK roll-out overseas, with the final dose being given at least 14 days earlier. Children normally resident in the UK were also exempt, as were adults who had been involved in a UK clinical vaccine trial. Exempt Amber list arrivals also benefited from reduced testing requirements, and did not need book or undertake a day 8 test.

Between 19 July and 8 August 2021, travellers who had visited Metropolitan France within the preceding 10 days were treated differently from other Amber list arrivals, in that the exemption mentioned in the previous paragraph did not apply to them. This was referred to as an "amber plus" list. On 8 August, Metropolitan France was brought back into line with the other Amber list countries.

==== Amber list exemptions from 2 August 2021 ====
On 2 August 2021 further self-isolation exemptions became available to travellers who had completed an approved course of vaccine outside the UK, specifically those regulated by the European Medicine Agency (EU member states, Andorra, Iceland, Lichtenstein, Monaco, Norway, San Marino, Vatican City), Swissmedic (Switzerland), or the Food and Drug Administration (US). Also exempt were children ordinarily resident in any of the countries listed. The US-based exemption for adults applied only to travellers who were "ordinarily resident in the US".

==== Amber list exemptions from 22 September 2021 ====
From 22 September 2021 there were new exemptions for foreign police force officials, people on cruise ships who did not disembark, seasonal poultry workers, performing arts professionals, persons engaged in film or high end TV, and road haulage support workers.

=== Red list arrivals, from 17 May 2021 ===
- The quarantine rules of this section were largely retained by the 4 October 2021 amendments, re-purposed as rules for Red list non eligible travellers. Following removal of all of remaining countries from the Red list on 1 November, and again on 15 December, there were after the latter date no countries to which the following Red list rules applied.

The countries listed in schedule 3 to the regulations, legally "Category 3 countries and territories", were commonly referred to as the "Red list". The following rules applied to all arrivals (unless exempt) who had been in or transited through a Red list country during the preceding 10 days.

==== Ports of entry ====
Travellers had to arrive at one of the approved airports, namely Heathrow, Gatwick, London City, Birmingham, Farnborough, Bristol, or any military airfield or port. London Biggin Hill (general aviation) was added to this list on 8 June 2021.

==== Requirement to provide information ====
Same as arrivals from Green list countries.

==== Requirement to possess negative test result ====
Initially, same as arrivals from Green list countries. But after the Green list was abolished on 4 October 2021, Red list travellers were still required on arrival in England to be in possession of notification of a negative COVID-19 test result. The test had to be of an approved type, and administered no more than three days earlier. From 7 December 2021 the pre-travel PCR test had to be taken by all travellers no more than two days prior to the final leg of the journey to England.

==== Requirement to pre-book a 'managed self-isolation package' ====
Travellers had to be in possession of a 'managed self-isolation package' comprising a booking for approved quarantine accommodation, a booking for approved transport to that accommodation, and bookings for COVID-19 tests at days 2 and day 8 after arrival.

==== Self-isolation in designated quarantine accommodation ====
At the quarantine accommodation the traveller had to isolate for at least 10 days, but if either test was missed or did not return a negative result the quarantine period was extended. Travellers required to isolate could do so together with anyone with whom they were travelling.

Travellers normally had to remain in their own room, and could not leave it except:

- to travel directly to a port to leave the Common Travel Area
- to fulfil a legal obligation
- to take exercise
- to visit a dying person or attend a funeral
- in other exceptional circumstances such as medical assistance, to access critical public services, or to escape risk of harm
- to access urgent veterinary services.

Leaving for the purpose of exercise, to visit a dying person, or attend a funeral required prior permission from an authorised person.

There were exemptions for certain government contractors, foreign government officials, transport workers, seaman, aircrew, channel tunnel workers, transit passengers, road hauliers (depending on transit countries), essential and emergency workers, offshore oil workers, some specialist, clinical and medical workers, and elite sportspeople. Also exempt were members of diplomatic or consular missions, diplomatic and consular couriers, government representatives on official business, and some members of their households. Special rules applied to people arriving to take up a job as an NHS nurse.

=== Prohibited and restricted direct routes ===
Direct air and boat journeys from some very high risk countries were prohibited until 8 June, on which date some restricted direct flights were again permitted but were required to land at arrive at Heathrow or Birmingham airports. The list of countries to which this applied was repeatedly amended. Travellers arriving from such countries had to comply with all of the Red country arrival rules.

=== List of countries and territories, 17 May to 4 October 2021 ===
The table below shows the countries and territories that were specifically named prior to the 4 October 2021 amendments. Most of the restrictions did not apply to arrivals into England from within the Common Travel Area (Ireland, Northern Ireland, Scotland, Wales, the Channel Islands and Isle of Man) unless the person had been outside the CTA in the preceding 10 days. Any country not specifically listed was deemed to be on the Amber list.

The starting dates shown are those on which these regulations (SI 2021/582) first applied. For many countries there were prior restrictions already in place under the preceding regulations, The Health Protection (Coronavirus, International Travel) (England) Regulations 2020 (SI 2020/568).

The table incorporates amendments to the regulations up to 4 October 2021, with the colours indicating the situation immediately prior to the abolition of the traffic light lists on that date. For 4 October 2021 and later amendments, see separate section below.

Traffic light status of countries and territories, 17 May to 4 October 2021
Country/territory [sortable]	Category 1 (Green list)	Category 2 (Amber list)	Category 3 (Red list)
Afghanistan		17 May 2021–8 June 2021	8 June 2021–
Angola			17 May 2021–
Anguilla	30 June 2021–	17 May 2021–30 June 2021	
Antigua and Barbuda	30 June 2021–	17 May 2021–30 June 2021	
Argentina			17 May 2021–
Australia	17 May 2021–		
Austria	8 August 2021–	17 May 2021–8 August 2021	
Bahrain		17 May 2021––8 June 2021, 8 August 2021–	8 June 2021–8 August 2021
Bangladesh		22 September 2021–	17 May 2021–22 September 2021
Barbados	30 June 2021–	17 May 2021–30 June 2021	
Bermuda	30 June 2021–	17 May 2021–30 June 2021	
Bolivia			17 May 2021–
Botswana			17 May 2021–
Brazil			17 May 2021–
British Antarctic Territory	30 June 2021–	17 May 2021–30 June 2021	
British Indian Ocean Territory	30 June 2021–	17 May 2021–30 June 2021	
British Virgin Islands	30 June 2021–19 July 2021	17 May 2021–30 June 2021, 19 July 2021–	
Brunei	17 May 2021–		
Bulgaria	19 July 2021–	17 May 2021–19 July 2021	
Burundi			17 May 2021–
Canada	28 August 2021–	17 May 2021–28 August 2021	
Cape Verde			17 May 2021–
Cayman Islands	30 June 2021–	17 May 2021–30 June 2021	
Chile			17 May 2021–
Colombia			17 May 2021–
Costa Rica		17 May 2021–8 June 2021	8 June 2021–
Croatia	19 July 2021–	17 May 2021–19 July 2021	
Cuba		17 May 2021–19 July 2021	19 July 2021–
Democratic Republic of Congo			17 May 2021–
Denmark	28 August 2021–	17 May 2021–28 August 2021	
Dominica	30 June 2021–	17 May 2021–30 June 2021	
Dominican Republic		17 May 2021–30 June 2021	30 June 2021–
Ecuador			17 May 2021–
Egypt		17 May 2021–8 June 2021, 22 September 2021–	8 June 2021–22 September 2021
Eritrea		17 May 2021–30 June 2021	30 June 2021–
Eswatini			17 May 2021–
Ethiopia			17 May 2021–
Faroe Islands	17 May 2021–		
Falkland Islands	17 May 2021–		
Finland	28 August 2021–	17 May 2021–28 August 2021	
France (Mayotte)		17 May 2021–8 August 2021	8 August 2021–
France (Réunion)		17 May 2021–8 August 2021	8 August 2021–
French Guiana			17 May 2021–
Germany	8 August 2021–	17 May 2021–8 August 2021	
Georgia		17 May 2021–8 August 2021	8 August 2021–
Gibraltar	17 May 2021–		
Grenada	30 June 2021–	17 May 2021–30 June 2021	
Guyana			17 May 2021–
Haiti		17 May 2021–30 June 2021	30 June 2021–
Hong Kong	19 July 2021–	17 May 2021–19 July 2021	
Iceland	17 May 2021–		
India		8 August 2021–	17 May 2021–
Indonesia		17 May 2021–19 July 2021	19 July 2021–
Israel	17 May 2021–		
Kenya		22 September 2021–	17 May 2021–22 September 2021
Latvia	8 August 2021–	17 May 2021–8 August 2021	
Liechtenstein	28 August 2021–	17 May 2021–28 August 2021	
Lesotho			17 May 2021–
Lithuania	28 August 2021–	17 May 2021–28 August 2021	
Malawi			17 May 2021–
Maldives, The		22 September 2021–	17 May 2021–22 September 2021
Malta	30 June 2021–	17 May 2021–30 June 2021	
Mexico		17 May 2021–8 August 2021	8 August 2021–
Mongolia		17 May 2021–30 June 2021	30 June 2021–
Montenegro		17 May 2021–28 August 2021	28 August 2021–
Montserrat	30 June 2021–	17 May 2021–30 June 2021	
Mozambique			17 May 2021–
Myanmar		17 May 2021–19 July 2021	19 July 2021–
Namibia			17 May 2021–
Nepal			17 May 2021–
New Zealand	17 May 2021–		
Norway	8 August 2021–	17 May 2021–8 August 2021	
Oman		22 September 2021–	17 May 2021–22 September 2021
Pakistan		22 September 2021–	17 May 2021–22 September 2021
Panama			17 May 2021–
Paraguay			17 May 2021–
Peru			17 May 2021–
Philippines			17 May 2021–
Pitcairn Islands	30 June 2021–	17 May 2021–30 June 2021	
Portugal (excluding The Azores and Madeira)	17 May 2021–8 June 2021	8 June 2021–	
Portugal (Madeira)	17 May 2021–8 June 2021, 30 June 2021–	8 June 2021–30 June 2021	
Portugal (The Azores)	17 May 2021–8 June 2021, 28 August 2021–	8 June 2021–28 August 2021	
Qatar		8 August 2021–	17 May 2021–8 August 2021
Romania	8 August 2021–	17 May 2021–8 August 2021	
Rwanda			17 May 2021–
Saint Helena, Ascension and Tristan da Cunha	17 May 2021–		
Seychelles			17 May 2021–
Sierra Leone		17 May 2021–19 July 2021	19 July 2021–
Singapore	17 May 2021–		
Slovakia	8 August 2021–	17 May 2021–8 August 2021	
Slovenia	8 August 2021–	17 May 2021–8 August 2021	
Somalia			17 May 2021–
South Africa			17 May 2021–
South Georgia and the South Sandwich Islands	17 May 2021–		
Spain (Balearic Islands only)	30 June 2021–19 July 2021	17 May 2021–30 June 2021, 19 July 2021–	
Sri Lanka		17 May 2021–8 June 2021, 22 September 2021–	8 June 2021–22 September 2021
Sudan		17 May 2021–8 June 2021	8 June 2021–
Suriname			17 May 2021–
Switzerland	28 August 2021–	17 May 2021–28 August 2021	
Taiwan	19 July 2021–	17 May 2021–19 July 2021	
Tanzania			17 May 2021–
Thailand		17 May 2021–28 August 2021	28 August 2021–
Trinidad and Tobago		17 May 2021–8 June 2021	8 June 2021–
Tunisia		17 May 2021–30 June 2021	30 June 2021–
Turkey		22 September 2021–	17 May 2021–22 September 2021
Turks and Caicos Islands	30 June 2021–	17 May 2021–30 June 2021	
Uganda		17 May 2021–30 June 2021	30 June 2021–
United Arab Emirates		8 August 2021–	17 May 2021–8 August 2021
Uruguay			17 May 2021–
Venezuela			17 May 2021–
Zambia			17 May 2021–
Zimbabwe			17 May 2021–

Key (immediately prior to the abolition of the traffic light lists on 4 October 2021)
GREEN LIST: No self-isolation. Must possess a negative test result, and a pre-booked test for day 2 after arrival
AMBER LIST: 10 day home self-isolation required. Must possess a negative test result, and pre-booked tests for days 2 and day 8 after arrival (exemptions available to some inoculated travellers from 19 July 2021 - see text above)
RED LIST: 10 day hotel isolation required. Must arrive via an approved airport, with both accommodation and tests for days 2 and 8 pre-booked

== 'Eligible traveller' and Red list rules, from 4 October 2021 ==
Prior to 4 October 2021, a 'traffic light' set of countries/territories had been maintained. On that date the concept was abandoned, with only the Red list being kept. The 4 October amendments introduced a scheme based on a new category of 'eligible traveller', arriving from a non Red list country and to whom lesser restrictions applied. Travellers from all countries still had to provide information on a passenger locator form in prescribed format.

=== Definition of 'eligible traveller' ===
An 'eligible traveller' was an arrival who:

- had not in the preceding 10 days been in a Red list country, and
- who met any of these requirements (a) to (e):
  - (a) could prove that they had completed a course of an authorised vaccine at least 14 days earlier, either in the UK or (for US residents only) in the US. Initially, 'authorised vaccine' meant only a vaccine approved for use in the UK or in a country regulated by the European Medicine Agency (EU member states, Andorra, Iceland, Lichtenstein, Monaco, Norway, San Marino, Vatican City), Swissmedic (Switzerland), the Food and Drug Administration (US), The Therapeutic Goods Administration (Australia) or Health Canada (Canada). Additional countries were added later, and from 1 November 2021 the country of vaccination restriction was lifted so that vaccines from any country were considered authorised.
  - (b) was or had been part of a UK or US clinical trial
  - (c) could provide proof that a registered medical practitioner had advised against vaccination
  - (d) was a UK resident under the age of 18
  - (e) could prove that they had completed a course of a vaccine at least 14 days earlier under the UK vaccine rollout overseas scheme. From 11 October 2021 this could be via an EU Digital Covid Certificate.

=== 'Eligible traveller' rules ===
==== 4 October to 24 October 2021 ====
On arrival in England, an eligible traveller (unless exempt) had to possess a booking for a COVID-19 day 2 PCR test, and subsequently complete that test. A traveller whose day 2 test result was positive or inconclusive, or who did not complete the test, had to self-isolate for a period of 10 or 14 days. Children were exempt.

==== 24 October to 30 November 2021 ====
On 24 October the rules were relaxed to allow eligible travellers the option of using an approved lateral flow device rather than PCR for the day 2 test.

==== 30 November to 7 December 2021 ====
Following the emergence of the Omicron variant, the regulations were tightened again from 30 November to require eligible travellers to book and undertake a PCR test by the second day after arrival, and to self-isolate until they received a negative result.

==== 7 December 2021 to 7 January 2022 ====
The rules were tightened on 7 December to require all non-exempt travellers over the age of 12, regardless of vaccination status, to possess on arrival notification of a negative result from an approved test (eg PCR, LFD or antigen) taken no more than two days before their final departure for England. The self-isolation requirement continued.

==== 7 January to 11 February 2022 ====
The rules were relaxed once more on 7 January 2022. From that date, eligible travellers no longer needed to possess notification of a negative test result on arrival, they could take a lateral flow rather than a PCR test on day 2 after arrival, and they no longer needed to self-isolate while awaiting the result. If a lateral flow test was used which gave a positive result on day 2, a confirmatory PCR test then had to be taken, followed if necessary by self isolation.

==== From 11 February 2022 ====
On 11 February, testing and self-isolation requirements for eligible travellers were abolished.

=== Non 'eligible traveller' rules ===
==== 4 October to 15 December 2021 ====
Non eligible travellers who had been in a Red list country during the preceding 10 days still had to follow the pre-4 October 2021 Red list arrival rules, including mandatory hotel isolation. Other non-eligible arrivals had to pre-book tests and to self-isolate as described below.

==== 7 December to 15 December 2021 ====
From 7 December 2021 an approved pre-travel test (eg PCR, LFD or antigen) had to be taken by all travellers, regardless of vaccination status, no more than two days prior to the final leg of the journey to England. All such arrivals had to pre-book tests as described below. Non Red list travellers had to self-isolate, while Red list travellers were subject to mandatory hotel isolation.

==== 15 December 2021 to 11 February 2022 ====
Following removal of all countries from the Red list on 15 December 2021, the distinction between Red list and other non-CTA countries disappeared. All non-eligible arrivals had to pre-book tests and to self-isolate as described below.

==== 11 February 2022 – 17 March 2022 ====
Non-eligible travellers no longer had to pre-book a day 8 test, nor to self-isolate on arrival. A day 2 test was still required.

===== Requirement to pre-book tests =====
Travellers who were required to do so had at their own expense to pre-book a 'testing package' comprising day 2 and day 8 PCR tests (a single day 2 test only from 11 February 2022). Younger children were exempt, and there was an extensive list of other exemptions and special cases.

===== Self-isolation rules =====
A traveller who was required to self-isolate had to do so at home or some other approved location normally for at least 10 days, or longer if a test returned a positive result. In some circumstances optional private tests were permitted which, if negative, allowed early release. The traveller did not need to remain in isolation during that period from any person they lived with at home, nor from anyone with whom they were travelling.

People who were self-isolating were not allowed to leave their place of self-isolation except:

- to travel to leave England, provided they did so directly
- to seek medical or veterinary assistance, or to obtain a COVID-19 test where required
- to fulfil a legal obligation such as to attend court, satisfy bail conditions, or participate in legal proceedings
- to avoid injury or illness or to escape a risk of harm
- on compassionate grounds, such as attending certain funerals
- to move to a different place of self-isolation
- in exceptional circumstances, for example to obtain basic necessities such as food or medical supplies where these could not be obtained in any other manner
- to access critical public services.

=== Red list timeline from 4 October 2021 ===
==== 4 to 11 October 2021 (Red list) ====
The Red list was not amended on 4 October 2021, and remained as indicated by the rows coloured red in the table for the period up to 4 October 2021 (see below section) until 11 October, namely:

- Afghanistan, Angola, Argentina, Bolivia, Botswana, Brazil, Burundi, Cape Verde, Chile, Democratic Republic of Congo, Costa Rica, Cuba, Eritrea, Eswatini, Ethiopia, French Guiana, Georgia, Guyana, Indonesia, Lesotho, Malawi, Mayotte, Mexico, Mongolia, Montenegro, Mozambique, Myanmar, Namibia, Nepal, Paraguay, Philippines, Réunion, Rwanda, Seychelles, Sierra Leone, Somalia, South Africa, Sudan, Suriname, Tanzania, Thailand, Trinidad and Tobago, Tunisia, Uganda, Uruguay, Zambia, Zimbabwe

==== 11 October to 1 November 2021 (Red list) ====
On 11 October, the above 47 countries were removed, leaving just seven Red list countries:

- Colombia, Dominican Republic, Ecuador, Haiti, Panama, Peru and Venezuela (these having been on the Red list under the new rules since 4 October)

==== 1 to 26 November 2021 (no Red list countries) ====
On 1 November, all of the remaining countries were removed from the Red list, and from that date until 26 November 2021 there were no countries to which Red list rules applied. However, the Red list regulations themselves still remained in force.

==== 26 to 28 November 2021 (Red list) ====
Following identification of variant of concern SARS-CoV-2 Omicron, it was announced on 25 November 2021 that the Red list would be brought back into use, and that South Africa, Namibia, Zimbabwe, Botswana, Lesotho and Eswatini would be added. Regulations introduced the next day banned direct flights to England from those countries. A temporary transitional provision allowed anyone arriving before 04:00 on 28 November who had during the preceding 10 days been in one of those countries to self-isolate at a location of their choice. After that time the full Red list restrictions applied, including mandatory hotel isolation.

==== 28 November to 6 December 2021 (Red list) ====
Following further concerns regarding the spread of the Omicron variant, Southern Africa, Angola, Malawi, Mozambique and Zambia were added to the Red list on 28 November.

==== 6 December to 15 December 2021 (Red list) ====
Nigeria was added to the Red list on Monday 6 December 2021.

==== 15 December 2021 – (no Red list countries) ====
On 15 December all countries were again removed from the Red list, and after that date arrivals from all countries were treated in the same way.

=== Red list countries and territories, 4 October to 15 December 2021 ===
The table below shows countries that were on the Red list between 4 October and 15 December 2021. After 15 December 2021 there were no countries on the Red list.

Red list status of countries and territories, 4 October to 15 December 2021
Country/territory [sortable]	Category 1 (Red list)	Category 2 (Not on red list)
Afghanistan	4 October 2021 – 11 October 2021	11 October 2021 –
Angola	4 October 2021 – 11 October 2021, 28 November 2021 – 15 December 2021	11 October 2021 – 28 November 2021, 15 December 2021 –
Argentina	4 October 2021 – 11 October 2021	11 October 2021 –
Bolivia	4 October 2021 – 11 October 2021	11 October 2021 –
Botswana	4 October 2021 – 11 October 2021, 26 November 2021 – 15 December 2021	11 October 2021 – 26 November 2021, 15 December 2021 –
Brazil	4 October 2021 – 11 October 2021	11 October 2021 –
Burundi	4 October 2021 – 11 October 2021	11 October 2021 –
Cape Verde	4 October 2021 – 11 October 2021	11 October 2021 –
Chile	4 October 2021 – 11 October 2021	11 October 2021 –
Colombia	4 October 2021 – 1 November 2021	1 November 2021 –
Democratic Republic of Congo	4 October 2021 – 11 October 2021	11 October 2021 –
Costa Rica	4 October 2021 – 11 October 2021	11 October 2021 –
Cuba	4 October 2021 – 11 October 2021	11 October 2021 –
Dominican Republic	4 October 2021 – 1 November 2021	1 November 2021 –
Ecuador	4 October 2021 – 1 November 2021	1 November 2021 –
Eritrea	4 October 2021 – 11 October 2021	11 October 2021 –
Eswatini	4 October 2021 – 11 October 2021, 26 November 2021 – 15 December 2021	11 October 2021 – 26 November 2021, 15 December 2021 –
Ethiopia	4 October 2021 – 11 October 2021	11 October 2021 –
French Guiana	4 October 2021 – 11 October 2021	11 October 2021 –
Georgia	4 October 2021 – 11 October 2021	11 October 2021 –
Guyana	4 October 2021 – 11 October 2021	11 October 2021 –
Haiti	4 October 2021 – 1 November 2021	1 November 2021 –
Indonesia	4 October 2021 – 11 October 2021	11 October 2021 –
Lesotho	4 October 2021 – 11 October 2021, 26 November 2021 – 15 December 2021	11 October 2021 – 26 November 2021, 15 December 2021 –
Malawi	4 October 2021 – 11 October 2021, 28 November 2021 – 15 December 2021	11 October 2021 – 28 November 2021, 15 December 2021 –
Mayotte	4 October 2021 – 11 October 2021	11 October 2021 –
Mexico	4 October 2021 – 11 October 2021	11 October 2021 –
Mongolia	4 October 2021 – 11 October 2021	11 October 2021 –
Montenegro	4 October 2021 – 11 October 2021	11 October 2021 –
Mozambique	4 October 2021 – 11 October 2021, 28 November 2021 – 15 December 2021	11 October 2021 – 28 November 2021, 15 December 2021 –
Myanmar	4 October 2021 – 11 October 2021	11 October 2021 –
Namibia	4 October 2021 – 11 October 2021, 26 November 2021 – 15 December 2021	11 October 2021 – 26 November 2021, 15 December 2021 –
Nepal	4 October 2021 – 11 October 2021	11 October 2021 –
Nigeria	6 December 2021 – 15 December 2021	4 October 2021 – 6 December 2021, 15 December 2021 –
Panama	4 October 2021 – 1 November 2021	1 November 2021 –
Paraguay	4 October 2021 – 11 October 2021	11 October 2021 –
Peru	4 October 2021 – 1 November 2021	1 November 2021 –
Philippines	4 October 2021 – 11 October 2021	11 October 2021 –
Réunion	4 October 2021 – 11 October 2021	11 October 2021 –
Rwanda	4 October 2021 – 11 October 2021	11 October 2021 –
Seychelles	4 October 2021 – 11 October 2021	11 October 2021 –
Sierra Leone	4 October 2021 – 11 October 2021	11 October 2021 –
Somalia	4 October 2021 – 11 October 2021	11 October 2021 –
South Africa	4 October 2021 – 11 October 2021, 26 November 2021 – 15 December 2021	11 October 2021 – 26 November 2021, 15 December 2021 –
Sudan	4 October 2021 – 11 October 2021	11 October 2021 –
Suriname	4 October 2021 – 11 October 2021	11 October 2021 –
Tanzania	4 October 2021 – 11 October 2021	11 October 2021 –
Thailand	4 October 2021 – 11 October 2021	11 October 2021 –
Trinidad and Tobago	4 October 2021 – 11 October 2021	11 October 2021 –
Tunisia	4 October 2021 – 11 October 2021	11 October 2021 –
Uganda	4 October 2021 – 11 October 2021	11 October 2021 –
Uruguay	4 October 2021 – 11 October 2021	11 October 2021 –
Venezuela	4 October 2021 – 1 November 2021	1 November 2021 –
Zambia	4 October 2021 – 11 October 2021, 28 November 2021 – 15 December 2021	11 October 2021 – 28 November 2021, 15 December 2021 –
Zimbabwe	4 October 2021 – 11 October 2021, 26 November 2021 – 15 December 2021	11 October 2021 – 26 November 2021, 15 December 2021 –

== Offences and enforcement ==
The regulations included an extensive list of penalties for breach of up to £10,000. They also created a wide variety of criminal offences under which offenders could be prosecuted.

== Review and revocation ==
The regulations were required to be reviewed every 28 days. They were originally intended to expire on 16 May 2022, but in the event were revoked on 18 March 2022.

== List of amendments by date ==
Amendments
SI No.	Amend. No.	Made	Effective from	Summary of major changes	Link
2021 statutory instruments
589	-	17 May	19 May	Changes relating to seafarers and inspectors and surveyors of ships, and minor corrections	
670	2	6 June	8 June	Portugal, including the Azores and Madeira, moved from Green to Amber, Afghanistan, Bahrain, Costa Rica, Egypt, Sri Lanka, Sudan, Trinidad and Tobago moved from Amber to Red, direct flights allowed from all previously-prohibited countries, but only into Heathrow and Birmingham (also applies to Bahrain, Bangladesh, Egypt, India, Kenya, Pakistan, Sri Lanka)	
731	3	19 June	22 June	Exempted certain people from self-isolation: UEFA officials attending Euro 2020, plus Football Association-invited sponsors, partners and team representatives, people associated with the Climate Change Conference or the Global Education Summit, and those arriving under the Afghan Relocations and Assistance policy	
766	4	27 June	Various dates, 29 June to 8 July	Added to Green List: Anguilla, Antigua and Barbuda, Balearic Islands, Barbados, Bermuda, British Antarctic Territory, British Indian Ocean Territory, British Virgin Islands, Cayman Islands, Dominica, Grenada, Madeira, Malta, Montserrat, Pitcairn Islands, Turks and Caicos Islands. Added to Red List: Dominican Republic, Eritrea, Haiti, Mongolia, Tunisia & Uganda. More exemptions to testing and/or isolation requirements: people with a ticket to attend the Euro 2020 Final and who are accredited by the local football association of any country whose team is playing, people invited by the Foreign Secretary, ferry service essential workers, sky martials, more senior executives, travellers in transit to Guernsey, Jersey or the IoM	
795	5	5 July	6 July	Football Association invitees attending Euro 2020 who are locally accredited by UEFA or by their local home country football association made exempt from the usual requirement to self-isolate on arrival	
865	6	18 July	19 July	Moved Balearic Islands and British Virgin Islands back up to Amber list, moved Cuba, Indonesia, Myanmar and Sierra Leone up to Red list, restrictions on direct flights from Cuba and Indonesia, exempt from self-isolation most fully-vaccinated arrivals from Amber list countries (other than France)	
914	7	30 July	2 Aug	Further self-isolation exemptions for Amber list travellers who had completed certain approved courses of vaccine outside the UK	
914	7	30 July	23 Aug	Changes to private test provider requirements	
923	8	5 Aug	8 Aug	Added to Green list: Austria, Germany, Latvia, Norway, Romania, Slovakia, Slovenia, added to Amber list: Bahrain, India, Qatar, United Arab Emirates, added to Red list: Georgia, Mexico, Réunion & Mayotte (France). Arrivals from mainland France treated as normal Amber list arrivals, with exemptions available for children and fully inoculated adults	
966	9	26 Aug	28 Aug	Added to Green list: The Azores (Portugal), Canada, Denmark, Finland, Liechtenstein, Lithuania, Switzerland, added to Red list: Montenegro, Thailand. Special rules for attendees to Climate Change Conference, World Leaders Summit and London Fashion Week. Updated list of sporting events. Tighter rules on test providers	
1003	10	7 Sep	8 Sep	Changes to provisions relating to elite sportspersons and people providing support	
1033	11	13 Sep	14 Sep	Special rules relating to EUFA arrivals	
1066	12	20 Sep	22 Sep	Moved from Red to Amber list: Egypt, Kenya, the Maldives, Oman, Pakistan, Turkey and Sri Lanka. New exemptions for foreign police force officials, people on cruise ships who did not disembark, seasonal poultry workers, performing arts professionals, persons engaged in film or high end TV, and road haulage support workers	
1107	13	1 Oct	4 Oct	Green and Amber lists abolished. New system based around the Red list, with border measures for travellers from the rest of the world depending upon the traveller's vaccination status and country of vaccination	
1130	14	8 Oct	11 Oct	Removed 47 countries from Red list, leaving Colombia, Dominican Republic, Ecuador, Haiti, Panama, Peru and Venezuela. Allow visitors with an EU Digital Covid Certificate to use that as proof of full vaccination. Amend rules for World Leaders Summit	
1155	15	18 Oct	19 Oct	Minor changes relating to elite sportspersons	
1179	16	22 Oct	24 Oct	Allowed “eligible travellers” to use an approved lateral flow device rather than PCR when taking a day 2 test	
1210	17	29 Oct	1 Nov	Removed all remaining countries from the Red list. Special rules for pork butchers. Vaccines from any country could be used to prove 'eligible traveller' status, as could participation in certain foreign clinical trials	
1289	18	19 Nov	22 Nov	Simplified the self-isolation requirements for transport and border workers and amended the definition of eligible traveller. Special rules for Future Tech Forum	
1323	19	26 Nov	26 Nov	Added Botswana, Eswatini, Lesotho, Namibia, South Africa, and Zimbabwe to the Red list. Home self-isolation applied to arrivals from these countries until 04:00 on 28 November, after which hotel quarantine applied	
1331	20	27 Nov	28 Nov	Added Angola, Malawi, Mozambique and Zambia to the Red list	
1339	21	29 Nov	30 Nov	All eligible travellers once again had to book a day 2 PCR test and self-isolate until they received a negative result.	
1367	22	5 Dec	6 Dec	Added Nigeria to the Red List	
1371	23	6 Dec	7 Dec	Introduced a requirement for all non-exempt travellers over the age of 12, regardless of vaccination status, to possess on arrival notification of a negative result from an approved test taken no more than two days before their final departure for England	
1434	24	14 Dec	15 Dec	Once again removed all remaining countries from the Red list	
1449	25	15 Dec	15 Dec	Transitional provisions, dealing with people in mandatory hotel accommodation at the time that SI 1434 entered into force	
1463	26	16 Dec	18 Dec	Various minor amendments, and changes to the list of sporting events	
2022 statutory instruments
11	-	6 Jan	7 Jan	Relaxed some of the rules for eligible travellers: they no longer had to possess notification of a negative test result on arrival, on day 2 they could (once again) take a lateral flow rather than PCR test, and they were not required to self-isolate while awaiting the result of that test	
125	2	10 Feb	11 Feb	All testing and self-isolation requirements for fully vaccinated travellers abolished. Non-eligible travellers had to pre-book a day 2 test, but did not need to self-isolate on arrival.	
317	-	17 Feb	18 Feb	Regulations revoked	

== Bibliography ==
- "SI 568". Legislation.gov.uk. 4 July 2021. The Health Protection (Coronavirus, International Travel) (England) Regulations 2020.
- "SI 582". Legislation.gov.uk. 17 May 2021. The Health Protection (Coronavirus, International Travel and Operator Liability) (England) Regulations 2021.
- "SI 589". Legislation.gov.uk. 19 May 2021. The Health Protection (Coronavirus, International Travel and Operator Liability) (England) (Amendment) Regulations 2021.
- "SI 670". Legislation.gov.uk. 8 June 2021. The Health Protection (Coronavirus, International Travel and Operator Liability) (England) (Amendment) (No. 2) Regulations 2021.
- "SI 731". Legislation.gov.uk. 22 June 2021. The Health Protection (Coronavirus, International Travel and Operator Liability) (England) (Amendment) (No. 3) Regulations 2021.
- "SI 766". Legislation.gov.uk. 29 June 2021. The Health Protection (Coronavirus, International Travel and Operator Liability) (England) (Amendment) (No. 4) Regulations 2021.
- "SI 795". Legislation.gov.uk. 6 July 2021. The Health Protection (Coronavirus, International Travel and Operator Liability) (England) (Amendment) (No. 5) Regulations 2021.
- "SI 865". Legislation.gov.uk. 19 July 2021. The Health Protection (Coronavirus, International Travel and Operator Liability) (England) (Amendment) (No. 6) Regulations 2021.
- "SI 914". Legislation.gov.uk. 2 August 2021. The Health Protection (Coronavirus, International Travel and Operator Liability) (England) (Amendment) (No. 7) Regulations 2021.
- "SI 923". Legislation.gov.uk. 8 August 2021. The Health Protection (Coronavirus, International Travel and Operator Liability) (England) (Amendment) (No. 8) Regulations 2021.
- "SI 966". Legislation.gov.uk. 28 August 2021. The Health Protection (Coronavirus, International Travel and Operator Liability) (England) (Amendment) (No. 9) Regulations 2021.
- "SI 1003". Legislation.gov.uk. 8 September 2021. The Health Protection (Coronavirus, International Travel and Operator Liability) (England) (Amendment) (No. 10) Regulations 2021.
- "SI 1033". Legislation.gov.uk. 14 September 2021. The Health Protection (Coronavirus, International Travel and Operator Liability) (England) (Amendment) (No. 11) Regulations 2021.
- "SI 1066". Legislation.gov.uk. 22 September 2021. The Health Protection (Coronavirus, International Travel and Operator Liability) (England) (Amendment) (No. 12) Regulations 2021.
- "SI 1107". Legislation.gov.uk. 4 October 2021. The Health Protection (Coronavirus, International Travel and Operator Liability) (England) (Amendment) (No. 13) Regulations 2021.
- "SI 1130". Legislation.gov.uk. 11 October 2021. The Health Protection (Coronavirus, International Travel and Operator Liability) (England) (Amendment) (No. 14) Regulations 2021.
- "SI 1155". Legislation.gov.uk. 19 October 2021. The Health Protection (Coronavirus, International Travel and Operator Liability) (England) (Amendment) (No. 15) Regulations 2021.
- "SI 1179". Legislation.gov.uk. 24 October 2021. The Health Protection (Coronavirus, International Travel and Operator Liability) (England) (Amendment) (No. 16) Regulations 2021.
- "SI 1210". Legislation.gov.uk. 1 November 2021. The Health Protection (Coronavirus, International Travel and Operator Liability) (England) (Amendment) (No. 17) Regulations 2021.
- "SI 1289". Legislation.gov.uk. 22 November 2021. The Health Protection (Coronavirus, International Travel and Operator Liability) (England) (Amendment) (No. 18) Regulations 2021.
- "SI 1323". Legislation.gov.uk. 26 November 2021. The Health Protection (Coronavirus, International Travel and Operator Liability) (England) (Amendment) (No. 19) Regulations 2021.
- "SI 1331". Legislation.gov.uk. 28 November 2021. The Health Protection (Coronavirus, International Travel and Operator Liability) (England) (Amendment) (No. 20) Regulations 2021.
- "SI 1339". Legislation.gov.uk. 30 November 2021. The Health Protection (Coronavirus, International Travel and Operator Liability) (England) (Amendment) (No. 21) Regulations 2021.
- "SI 1367". Legislation.gov.uk. 5 December 2021. The Health Protection (Coronavirus, International Travel and Operator Liability) (England) (Amendment) (No. 22) Regulations 2021.
- "SI 1371". Legislation.gov.uk. 7 December 2021. The Health Protection (Coronavirus, International Travel and Operator Liability) (England) (Amendment) (No. 23) Regulations 2021.
- "SI 1434". Legislation.gov.uk. 15 December 2021. The Health Protection (Coronavirus, International Travel and Operator Liability) (England) (Amendment) (No. 24) Regulations 2021.
- "SI 1449". Legislation.gov.uk. 16 December 2021. The Health Protection (Coronavirus, International Travel and Operator Liability) (England) (Amendment) (No. 25) Regulations 2021.
- "SI 1463". Legislation.gov.uk. 18 December 2021. The Health Protection (Coronavirus, International Travel and Operator Liability) (England) (Amendment) (No. 26) Regulations 2021.
- "SI 11". Legislation.gov.uk. 7 January 2022. The Health Protection (Coronavirus, International Travel and Operator Liability) (England) (Amendment) Regulations 2022.
- "SI 125". Legislation.gov.uk. 10 February 2022. The Health Protection (Coronavirus, International Travel and Operator Liability) (England) (Amendment) (No. 2) Regulations 2022.
- "SI 317". Legislation.gov.uk. 17 March 2022. The Health Protection (Coronavirus, International Travel and Operator Liability) (Revocation) (England) Regulations 2022.
