= Passenger locator form =

Form providing traveller information

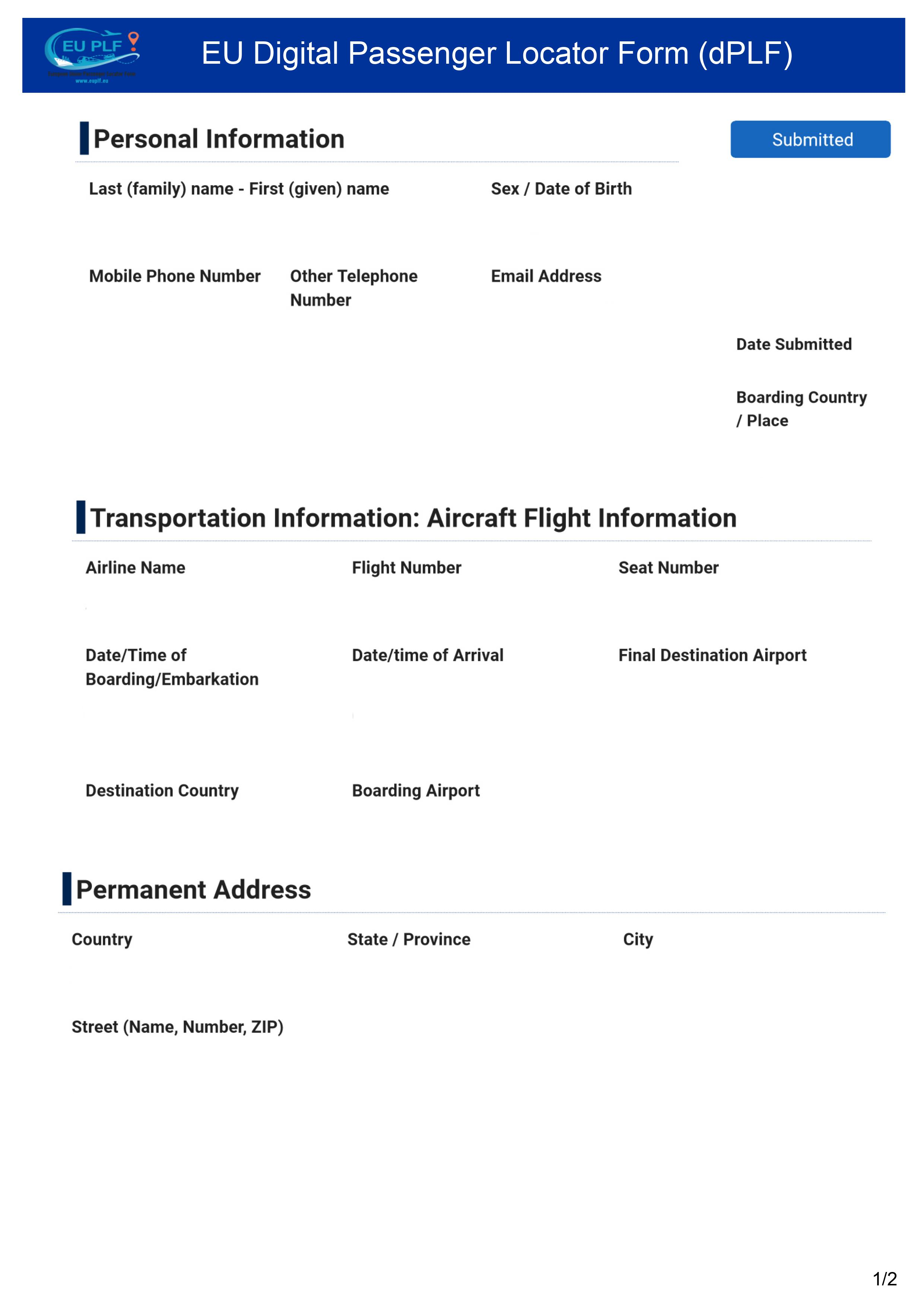

A passenger locator form (PLF) is a form used by some countries to obtain information about incoming passengers prior to international travel. It typically requests contact, journey, and stay details. It may take the form of a physical document, or be entirely electronic and contain little more than a barcode.

== Ireland ==
During the COVID-19 pandemic, Ireland required incoming travellers to complete a Passenger Locator Form. This requirement was withdrawn with effect from Sunday 6 March 2022.

== United Kingdom ==
During the COVID-19 pandemic, the UK Government required incoming travellers to complete a passenger locator form. This requirement was withdrawn with effect from 4 a.m. on Friday 18 March 2022.
